= Lilienthal Vorflügelapparat =

Vorflügelapparat - Lilienthal's Experimental Monoplane
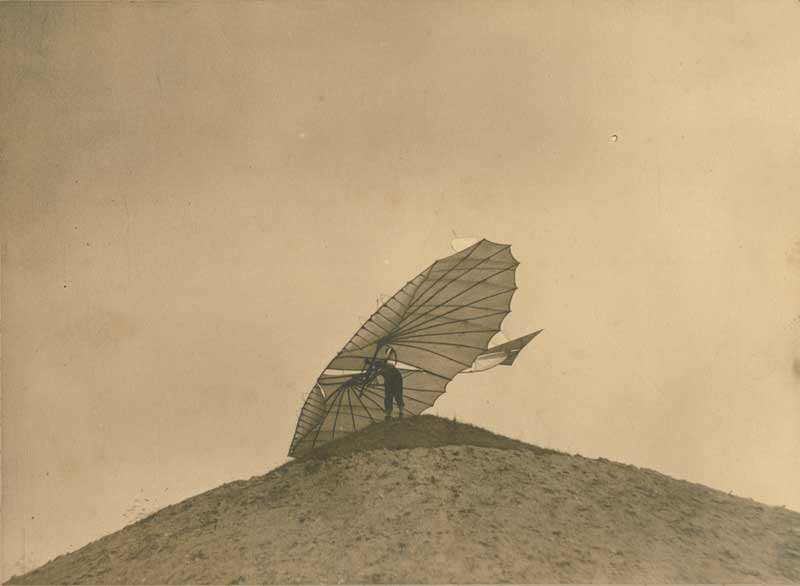
- Otto Lilienthal in Lichterfelde (near Berlin), 1895

General information
- Type: Glider
- National origin: Germany
- Manufacturer: Otto Lilienthal
- Designer: Otto Lilienthal
- Number built: 1

History
- First flight: 1895

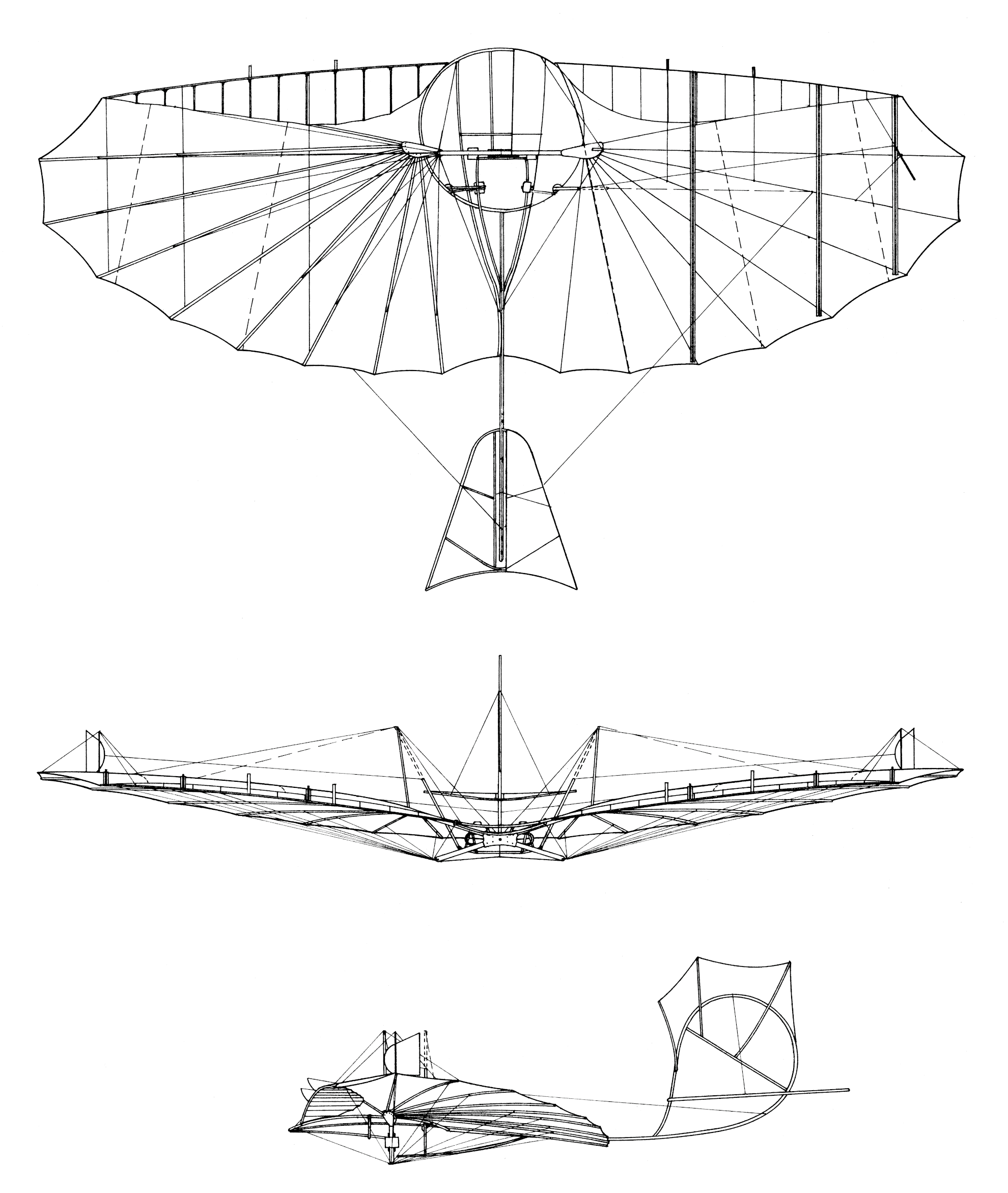
Technical drawing of Otto Lilienthal's Experimental Monoplane from 1895

Lilienthal’s Experimental Monoplane, the "Vorflügelapparat", was an experimental aviation device designed to test various control elements, after Otto Lilienthal had managed to achieve the beginnings of controlled flights solely by shifting his body weight.

== Details ==
The Experimental Monoplane represents a particularly advanced glider design, which Lilienthal considered to be inherently stable and which he used as a test vehicle for experimental control devices. These devices were aiming for more control authority in order to substitute or even replace the weight-shift control method Lilienthal had predominantly used and which is still used in modern hang gliding. It was one of the largest monoplanes Lilienthal ever built. The schematic drawing of the experimental craft in Lilienthal's second aircraft patent No. 84417 (77) of May 29, 1895 is based on the glider of the first aircraft patent of 1893, as it is a supplementary patent to the first aircraft patent of 1893. However, the actual special feature of the experimental craft does not lie in its large size, but in the fact that a narrow, movable partial wing is positioned in front of each of the wings. The leading edge, which forms the pivot point of the object, consists of an approximately 3.2 meters long spar to which eleven short ribs are attached at right angles in the direction of flight. Photographs of the Experimental Monoplane were taken by the physician and amateur photographer Dr. Neuhauss. They show that in addition to the two rods on the hinge pockets, two longer control rods are attached to the apparatus. They extend from the spar cross and are guided diagonally upwards through the frame circle in Lilienthal's back. The cords for the control devices, which Lilienthal tested during the summer of 1895 and which are described below, ran over them.

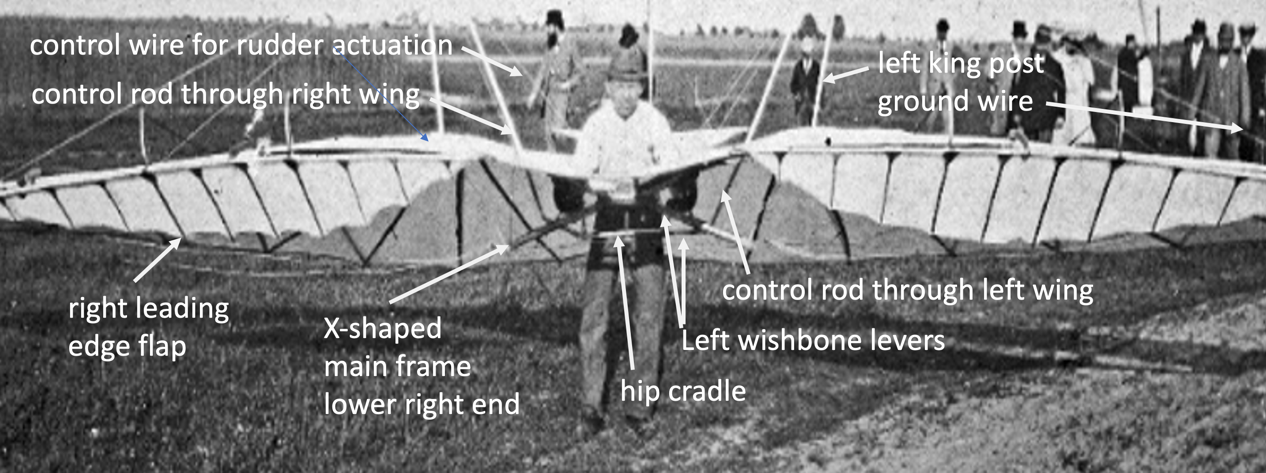
Control devices of Otto Lilienthal's Experimental Monoplane demonstrated on the Fliegeberg on May 29, 1895, the day the patent application is filed (photo by Richard Neuhauss)

== Development and Construction ==
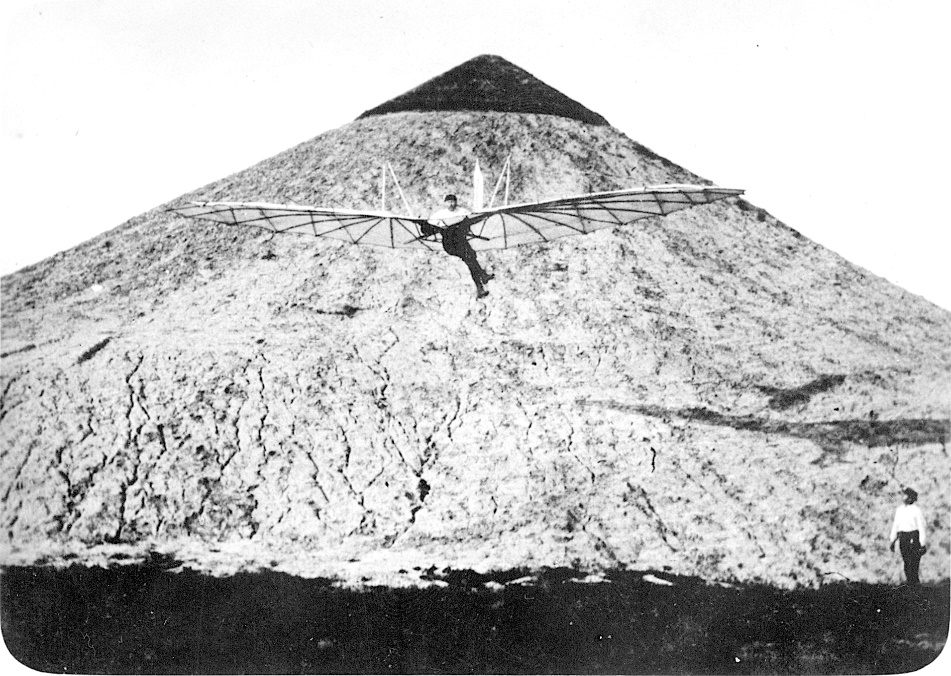
Otto Lilienthal flying his Experimental Monoplane 1895 at his training hill "Fliegeberg" (photographer R. Neuhauss)

Lilienthal did not report on his experiments with mechanical control devices either in his essays or in his lectures, but he shared information with some fellow enthusiasts in letters, especially with Alois Wolfmüller in Munich, but also with James Means (one of the founders of the Boston Aeronautical Society), who had invited Lilienthal to come to the U.S. to teach American enthusiast the secret of flight. Wolfmüller had devised a device for warping the wings as well as a device for sitting in the flying machine. After the parties had agreed on "accommodating reciprocity in the protection of legitimate interests", a kind of nondisclosure agreement, Wolfmüller presented his ideas in a detailed letter dated September 28, 1895, together with the results of experiments carried out on the control of flying machines of Lilienthal's design. This prompted Lilienthal to openly reveal his own experiments with warping the wings and rudder control. The Wright brothers continued the development of the wing warping mechanism to patent maturity a few years later. It constituted the actual basis for the ultimate success of the two American aviation pioneers. A sketch shows a Lilienthal drawing of a wing warping mechanism, which served as a control mechanism for Lilienthal's flying apparatus. The lower tensioning wires do not end at one point on the frame cross, but at various points on a lever arm. The lever arms were moved by moving the hips, as the hands were needed to hold on to the apparatus.

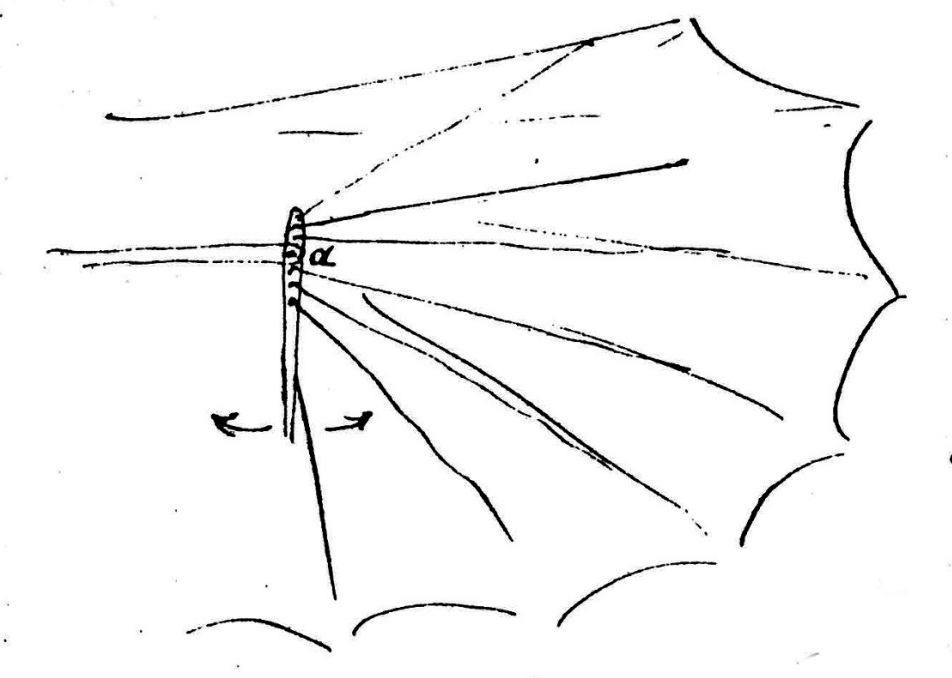
Sketch of wing warping mechanism from a letter from Otto Lilienthal to Alois Wolfmüller in 1895

Lilienthal also recognized wing warping as the simplest and most effective method for improving the stability of the flying machine. He had already written to Wolfmüller in August 1895: "It can be ascertained that the shifting of the center of gravity must have a greater strength than would be possible with locomotion with large wings in the wind. The present investigation comes to the conclusion that the simplest method of equalizing the load-bearing capacity of the two wings is to make the wings rotatable about their longitudinal axis. It was found that this method is the safest. The same procedure can also be observed in birds." Wolfmüller presented his ideas on wind warping control in a detailed letter in return. Lilienthal's flight experiments also included those with small control surfaces on the wings. The photographs taken by P. W. Preobrashenski at the end of July or beginning of August 1895 prove that the experiments were carried out. The effectiveness of these devices, known as "spoilerons", was proven in more recent wind tunnel and flight tests. They are currently also used by ultra-light aircraft, such as the "Easyriser", as roll and yaw control. It was found that the wing warping mechanisms developed by Lilienthal and their combination with the actuation of the rudder could be used to avoid adverse yaw and thus fly coordinated turns.

== Reconstruction ==
The original Experimental Monoplane glider Vorflügelapparat did not survive. However, there are several photographs showing the glider in flight and on the ground on which the structure and the control mechanismens can be seen. Reconstructions exist in several museums. An authentic replica of the Vorflügelapparat was built by the German Aerospace Center (DLR) and the Otto Lilienthal Museum and has been investigated during flight tests in California and North Carolina. The reconstruction of a replica of this glider type used for flight testing was possible by means of the patent drawings of the monoplane glider and many detailed photographs. The results prove that the glider was stable in pitch and roll and can be flown safely at moderate altitudes in smooth air.

Flight of an authentic replica of Otto Lilienthal's Experimental Monoplane, Marina Beach, CA, 2022

== Specifications (typical) ==
Data from Die Flugzeuge von Otto Lilienthal

General characteristics

- Crew: One
- Length: 6.10 m (20 ft 0 in)
- Wingspan: 9.10 m (29 ft 10 in)
- Wing area: 22 m^{2} (240 sq ft)
- Empty weight: 25.4 kg (56 lb)

Performance

- Maximum glide ratio: 5.5
