= Lilienthal Large Biplane =

Großer Doppeldecker
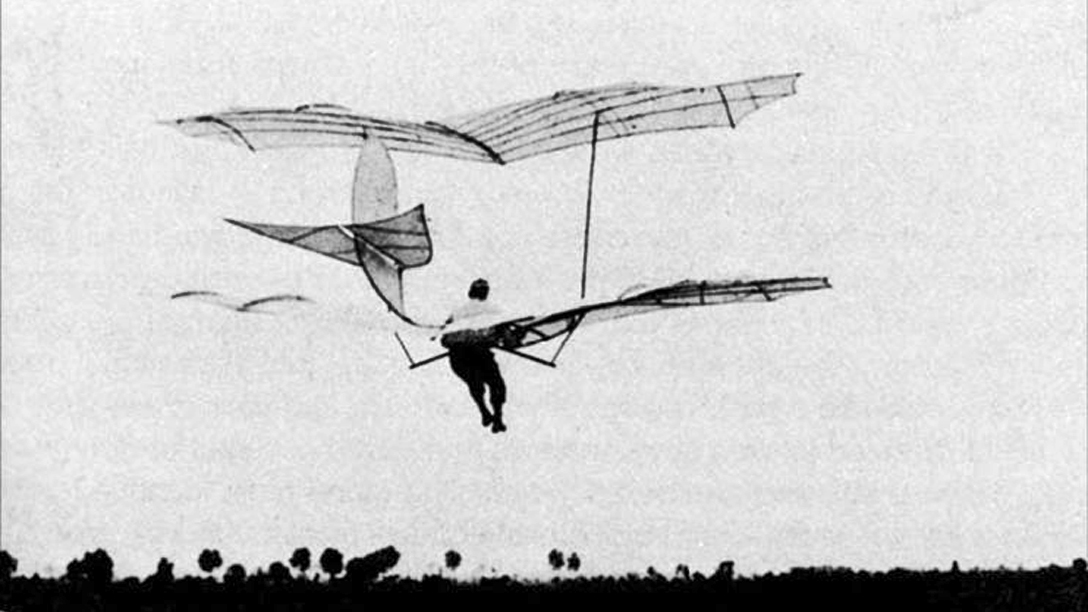
- Otto Lilienthal in Lichterfelde (near Berlin) on October 19, 1895

General information
- Type: Glider
- National origin: Germany
- Manufacturer: Otto Lilienthal
- Designer: Otto Lilienthal
- Number built: 1

History
- First flight: 1895

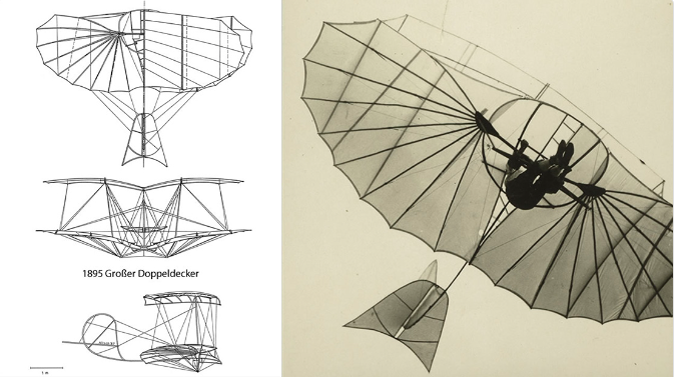
Technical drawing of a large biplane and in flight by Otto Lilienthal in 1895

A glider called a Large Biplane (Großer Doppeldecker) was designed and built in 1895 as an advanced stage of the Lilienthal Normalsegelapparat – a monoplane glider invented by Otto Lilienthal. The Normalsegelapparat was patented in Germany in 1893, and later in 1895 in the United States and was the first production aircraft in history. Like its preceding model, the Large Biplane is a hang glider which is controlled through weight-shift by the pilot, as hang gliders are to this day.

== Development ==
The objective of the biplane was to increase the wing surface of the monoplane Normalsegelapparat without increasing the wingspan. This would have made controlling the aircraft more difficult as the pilot only had limited range to shift his or her weight in the cockpit. Lilienthal had already upgraded one of his smaller monoplane models - the Sturmflügelmodell - to a smaller biplane that same year. While building the Large Biplane he made use of this experience. It was one of the many aircraft designs only flown by Lilienthal himself. Countless flights with both biplanes have been photographically documented. Lilienthal flew both gliders from his personal flying hill in Lichterfelde (Berlin). In 1896 he flew the Large Biplane at the Gollenberg near Stölln in Havelland. These two gliders are the first successful man carrying biplanes in history.

== Construction Details ==
The lower deck is the exact same size as the one used in Lilienthal's patented monoplane glider. The upper deck is not, like the lower one, completely foldable, but folds in the middle. Thus the glider is easily reduced to a transportable width of a little more than two meters. Besides the intent to increase lift, the upper deck also changes the flight mechanical properties in comparison to the monoplane. The aerodynamic center is higher and therefore increases flight stability, but reduces lateral control authority. Lilienthal's goal was to eventually use stronger winds to achieve long-lasting (gliding) flights.

== Reconstruction ==
The original Large Biplane glider did not survive. However, there are several exemplars of the original monoplane that the biplane was based on. Reconstructions exist in several museums. An authentic replica of the Large Biplane made by the Otto Lilienthal Museum has been investigated by the German Aerospace Center (DLR) during flight tests in California and North Carolina. The reconstruction of a replica of this glider type used for flight testing was possible by means of the patent drawings of the monoplane glider and many detailed photographs, of both the monoplane and the biplane. The results prove that the glider was stable in pitch and roll and can be flown safely at moderate altitudes in smooth air.

== Specifications (typical) ==
Andrew Beem (Windsports, LA) flying an authentic replica of the Großer Doppeldecker at the Californian coast (near Monterey) on July 29, 2019

Data from Die Flugzeuge von Otto Lilienthal

General characteristics

- Crew: One
- Length: 5.30 m (17 ft 5 in)
- Wingspan: 6.70 m (22 ft 0 in)
- Wing area: 24 m^{2} (260 sq ft)
- Empty weight: 25 kg (55 lb)

Performance

- Maximum glide ratio: 4
