= Biplane =

Airplane wing configuration with two vertically stacked main flying surfaces

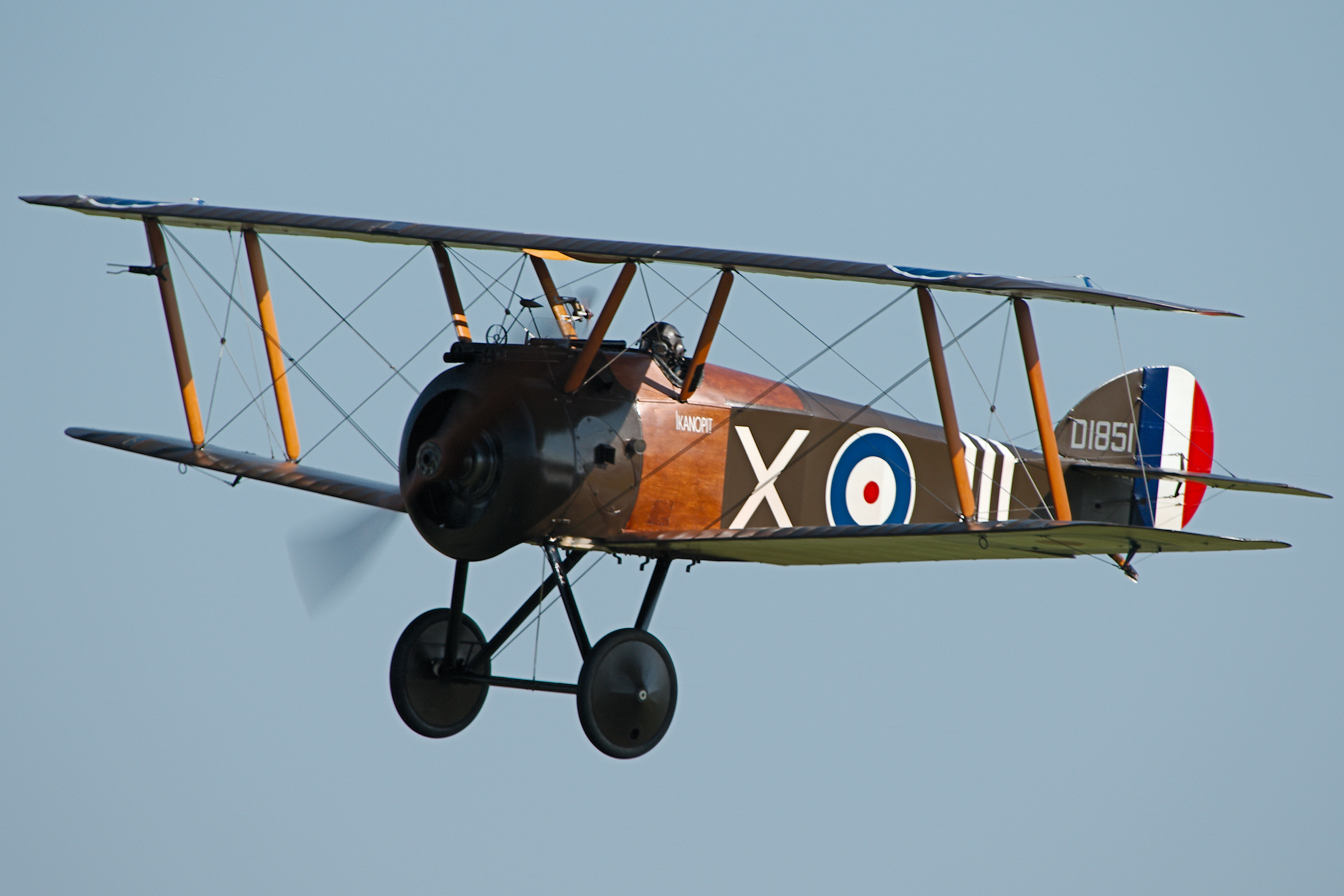
First World War Sopwith Camel biplane

A biplane is a fixed-wing aircraft with two main wings stacked one above the other. The first powered, controlled aeroplane to fly, the Wright Flyer, used a biplane wing arrangement, as did many aircraft in the early years of aviation. While a biplane wing structure has a structural advantage over a monoplane, it produces more drag than a monoplane wing. Improved structural techniques, better materials and higher speeds made the biplane configuration obsolete for most purposes by the late 1930s.

Biplanes offer several advantages over conventional cantilever monoplane designs: they permit lighter wing structures, low wing loading and smaller span for a given wing area. However, interference between the airflow over each wing increases drag substantially, and biplanes generally need extensive bracing, which causes additional drag.

Biplanes are distinguished from tandem wing arrangements, where the wings are placed forward and aft, instead of above and below.

The term is also occasionally used in biology, to describe the wings of some flying animals.

== Characteristics ==
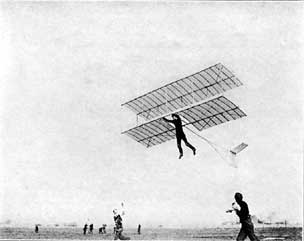
1920s biplane hang glider

In a biplane aircraft, two wings are placed one above the other. Each provides part of the lift, although they are not able to produce twice as much lift as a single wing of similar size and shape because the upper and the lower are working on nearly the same portion of the atmosphere and thus interfere with each other's behaviour. In a biplane configuration with no stagger from the upper wing to the lower wing, the lift coefficient is reduced by 10 to 15 percent compared to that of a monoplane using the same airfoil and aspect ratio.

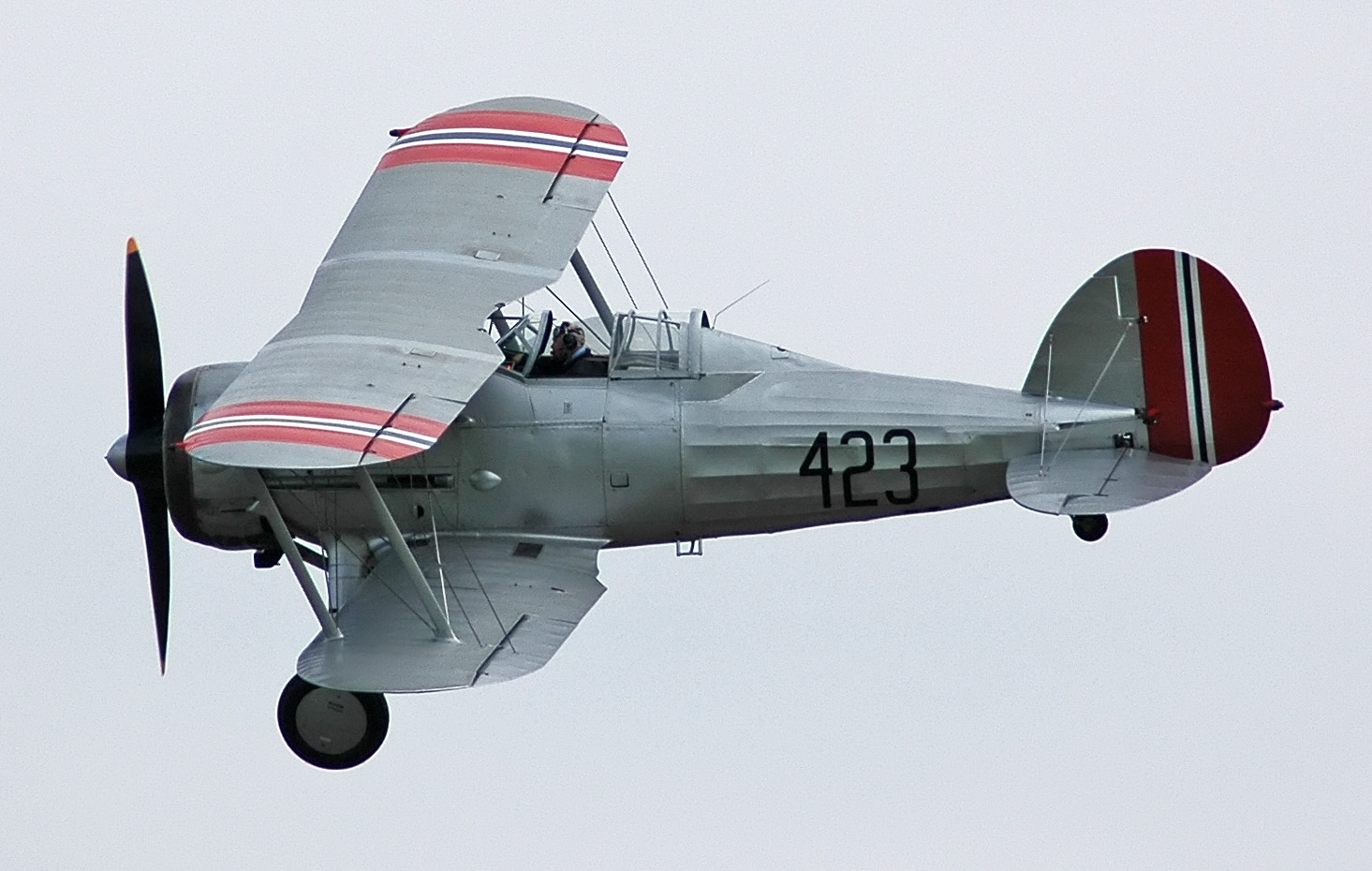
The Gloster Gladiator, a biplane World War II fighter

The lower wing is usually attached to the fuselage, while the upper wing is raised above the fuselage with an arrangement of cabane struts, although other arrangements have been used. Either or both of the main wings can support ailerons, while flaps are more usually positioned on the lower wing. Bracing is nearly always added between the upper and lower wings, in the form of interplane struts positioned symmetrically on either side of the fuselage and bracing wires to keep the structure from flexing, where the wings are not themselves cantilever structures.

=== Advantages and disadvantages ===
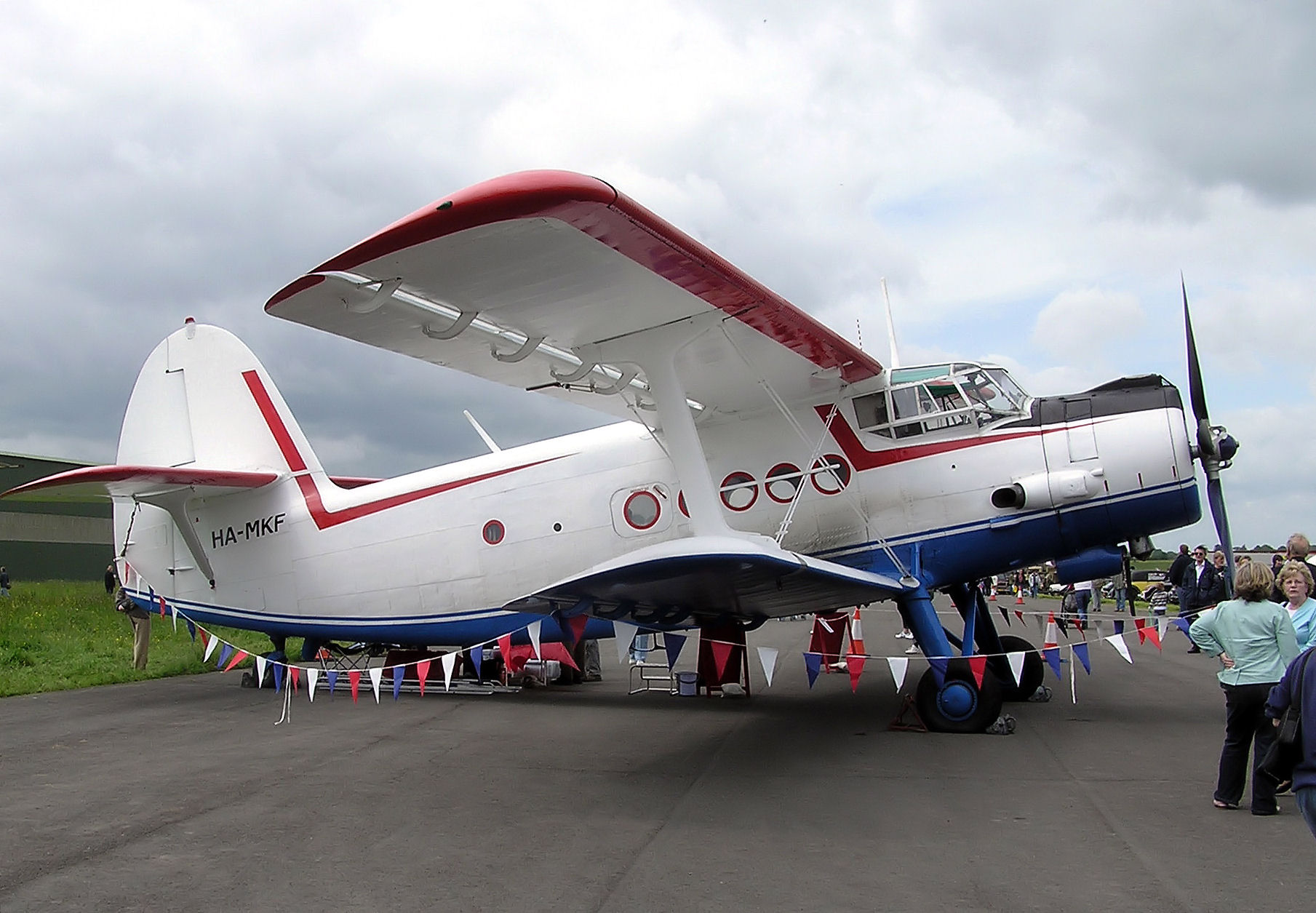
Soviet Antonov An-2 biplane from the 1940s

The primary advantage of the biplane over a monoplane is its ability to combine greater stiffness with lower weight. Stiffness requires structural depth and where early monoplanes had to have this provided with external bracing, the biplane naturally has a deep structure and is therefore easier to make both light and strong. Rigging wires on non-cantilevered monoplanes are at a much sharper angle, thus providing less tension to ensure stiffness of the outer wing. On a biplane, since the angles are closer to the ideal of being in direct line with the forces being opposed, the overall structure can then be made stiffer. Because of the reduced stiffness, wire braced monoplanes often had multiple sets of flying and landing wires where a biplane could easily be built with one bay, with one set of landing and flying wires. The extra drag from the wires was not enough to offset the aerodynamic disadvantages from having two airfoils interfering with each other however. Strut braced monoplanes were tried but none of them were successful, not least due to the drag from the number of struts used.

The structural forces acting on the spars of a biplane wing tend to be lower as they are divided between four spars rather than two, so the wing can use less material to obtain the same overall strength and is therefore lighter. A given area of wing also tends to be shorter, reducing bending moments on the spars, which then allow them to be more lightly built as well. The biplane does however need extra struts to maintain the gap between the wings, which add both weight and drag.

The low power supplied by the engines available in the first years of aviation limited aeroplanes to fairly low speeds. This required an even lower stalling speed, which in turn required a low wing loading, combining both large wing area with light weight. Obtaining a large enough wing area without the wings being long, and thus dangerously flexible was more readily accomplished with a biplane.

The smaller biplane wing allows greater maneuverability. Following World War I, this helped extend the era of the biplane and, despite the performance disadvantages, most fighter aircraft were biplanes as late as the mid-1930s. Specialist sports aerobatic biplanes are still made in small numbers.

Biplanes suffer aerodynamic interference between the two planes when the high pressure air under the top wing and the low pressure air above the lower wing cancel each other out. This means that a biplane does not in practice obtain twice the lift of the similarly sized monoplane. The farther apart the wings are spaced the less the interference, but the spacing struts must be longer, and the gap must be extremely large to reduce it appreciably.

As engine power and speeds rose late in World War I, thick cantilever wings with inherently lower drag and higher wing loading became practical, which in turn made monoplanes more attractive as it helped solve the structural problems associated with monoplanes, but offered little improvement for biplanes.

=== Stagger ===
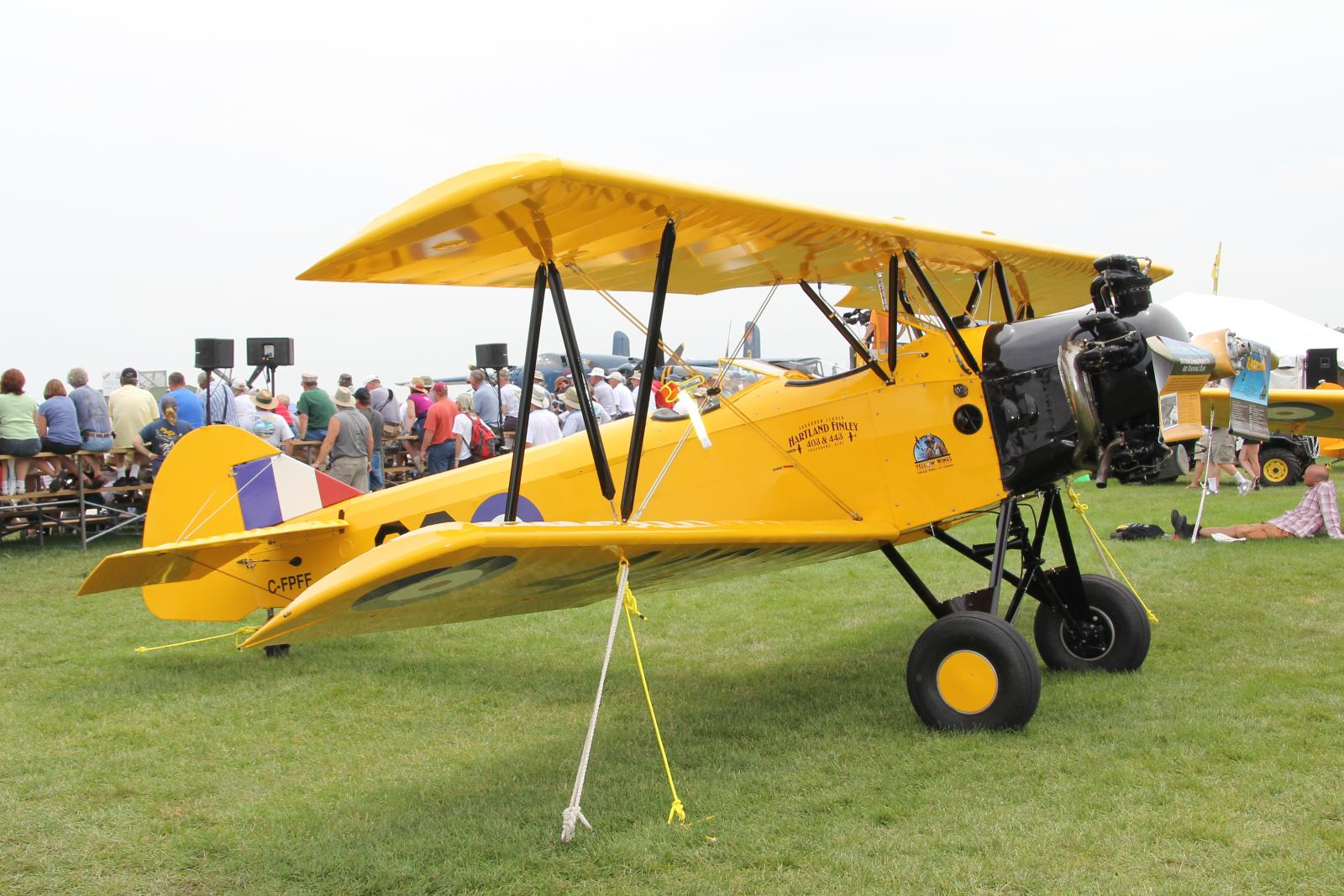
Wing stagger on a Fleet Finch primary trainer

The default design for a biplane has the wings positioned directly one above the other. Moving the upper wing forward relative to the lower one is called positive stagger or, more often, simply stagger. It can increase lift and reduce drag by reducing the aerodynamic interference effects between the two wings by a small degree, but more often was used to improve access to the cockpit. Many biplanes have staggered wings. Common examples include the de Havilland Tiger Moth, Bücker Bü 131 Jungmann and Travel Air 2000.

Alternatively, the lower wing can instead be moved ahead of the upper wing, giving negative stagger, and similar benefits. This is usually done in a given design for structural reasons, or to improve visibility. Examples of negative stagger include the Sopwith Dolphin, Breguet 14 and Beechcraft Staggerwing. However, positive (forward) stagger is much more common.

=== Bays ===
The space enclosed by a set of interplane struts is called a bay (much as the architectural form is used), hence a biplane or triplane with one set of such struts connecting the wings on each side of the aircraft is a single-bay biplane. This provided sufficient strength for smaller aircraft such as the First World War-era Fokker D.VII fighter and the Second World War de Havilland Tiger Moth basic trainer.

The larger two-seat Curtiss JN-4 Jenny is a two bay biplane, the extra bay being necessary as overlong bays are prone to flexing and can fail. The SPAD S.XIII fighter, while appearing to be a two bay biplane, has only one bay, but has the midpoints of the rigging braced with additional struts; however, these are not structurally contiguous from top to bottom wing. The Sopwith 1½ Strutter has a W shape cabane, however as it does not connect the wings to each other, it does not add to the number of bays.

Large transport and bombing biplanes often needed still more bays to provide sufficient strength. These are often referred to as multi-bay biplanes. A small number of biplanes, such as the Zeppelin-Lindau D.I have no interplane struts and are referred to as being strutless.

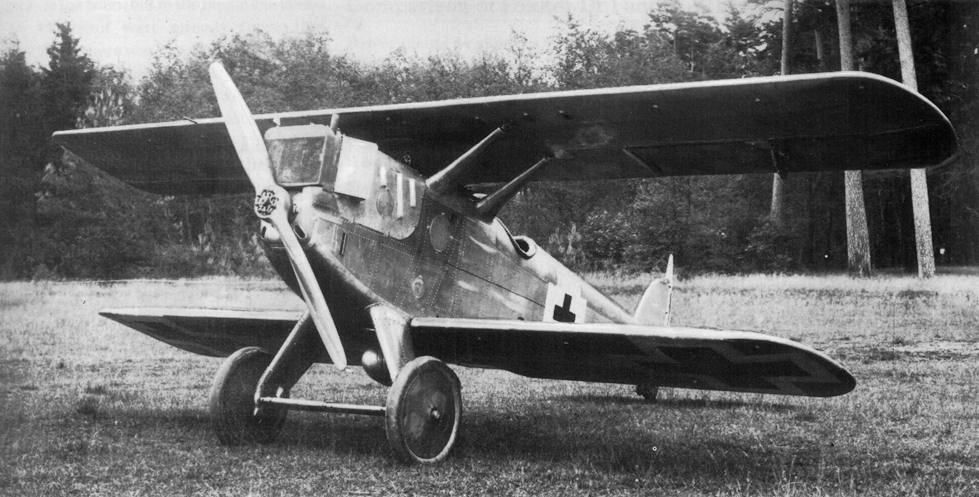
Zeppelin-Lindau D.I strutless biplane

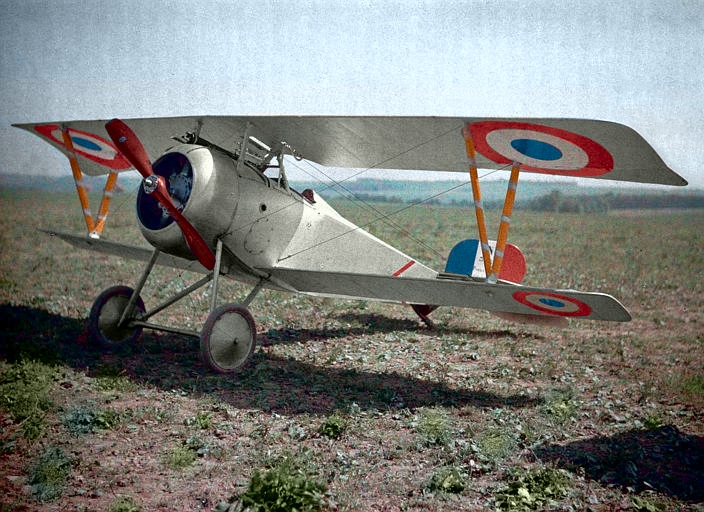
Nieuport 23 single-bay sesquiplane

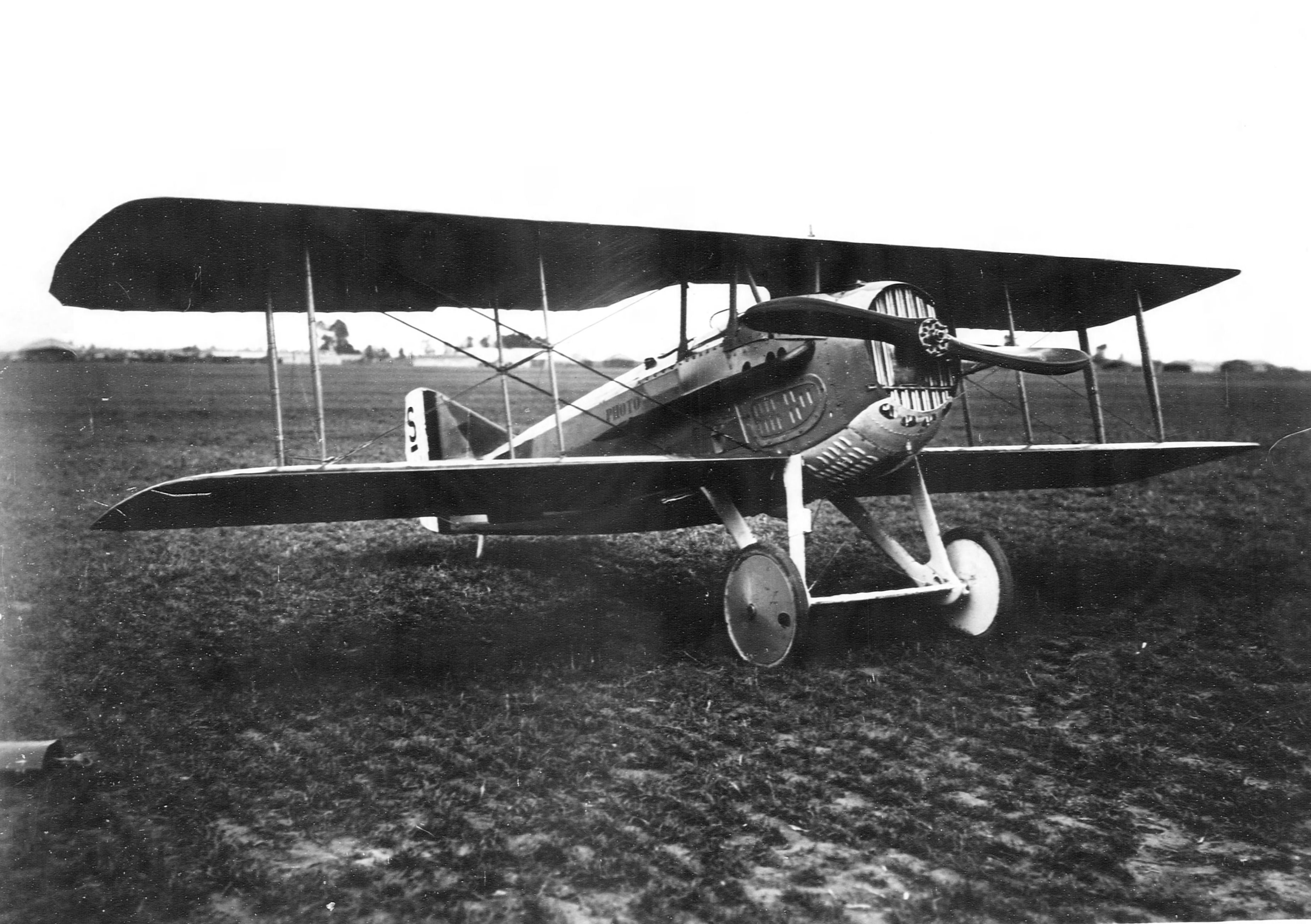
SPAD S.XIII single-bay biplane with auxiliary struts

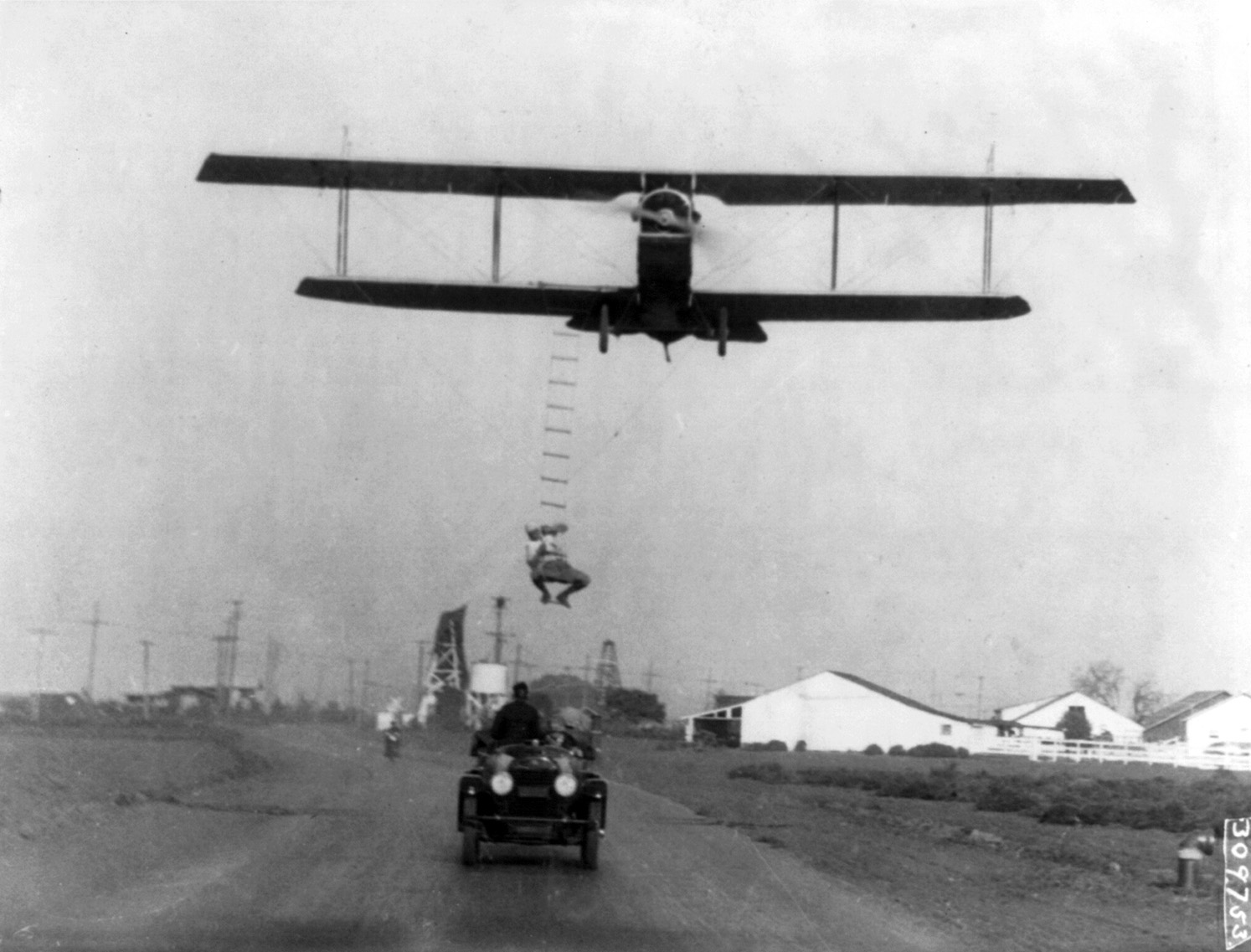
Curtiss JN-4 two-bay biplane

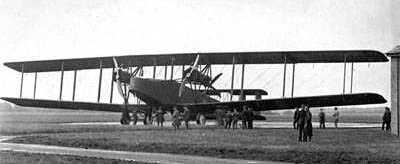
Handley Page V/1500 four-bay or multi-bay biplane

=== Rigging ===
Because most biplanes do not have cantilever structures, they require rigging wires to maintain their rigidity. Early aircraft used simple wire (either braided or plain), however during the First World War, the British Royal Aircraft Factory developed airfoil section wire named RAFwire in an effort to both increase the strength and reduce the drag. Four types of wires are used in the biplane wing structure. Drag wires inside the wings prevent the wings from being folded back against the fuselage, running inside a wing bay from the forward inboard corner to the rear outboard corner. Anti-drag wires prevent the wings from moving forward when the aircraft stops and run the opposite direction to the drag wires. Both of these are usually hidden within the wings, and if the structure is sufficiently stiff otherwise, may be omitted in some designs. Indeed, many early aircraft relied on the fabric covering of the wing to provide this rigidity, until higher speeds and forces made this inadequate. Externally, lift wires prevent the wings from folding up, and run from the underside of the outer wing to the lower wing root. Conversely, landing wires prevent the wings from sagging, and resist the forces when an aircraft is landing, and run from the upper wing centre section to outboard on the lower wings. Additional drag and anti-drag wires may be used to brace the cabane struts which connect the fuselage to the wings, and interplane struts, which connect the upper and lower wings together.

=== Sesquiplane ===
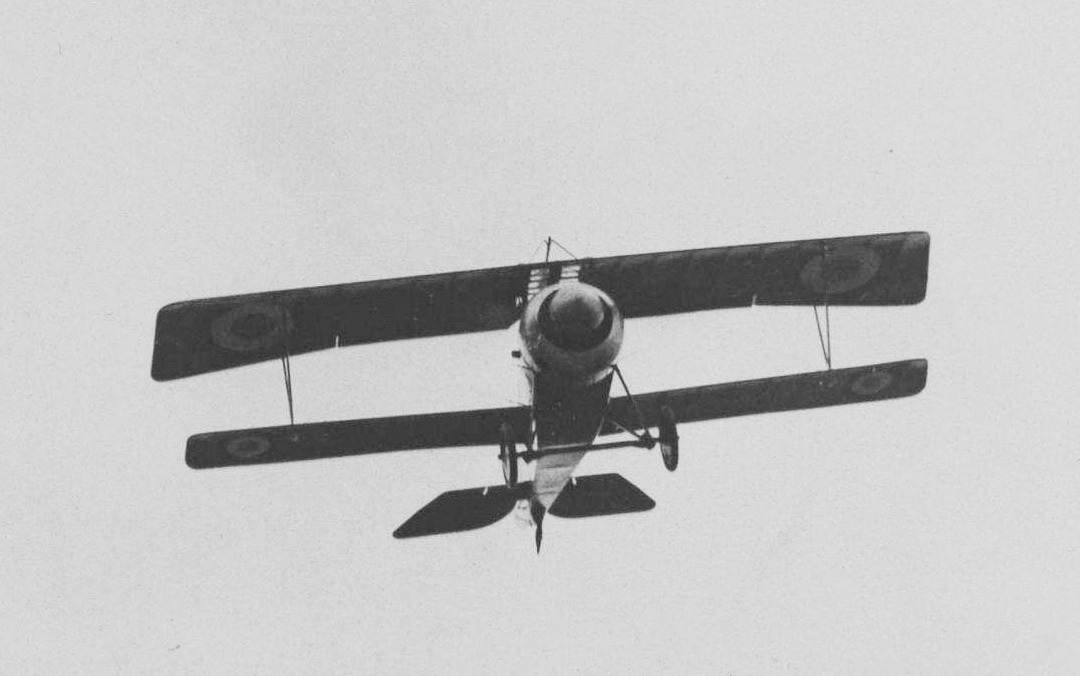
The lower wing of the Nieuport 17 has smaller chord, but similar span, than the upper wing

The sesquiplane is a type of biplane where one wing (usually the lower) is significantly smaller than the other. The word, from Latin, means "one-and-a-half wings". The arrangement can reduce drag and weight while retaining the biplane's structural advantages. The lower wing may have a significantly shorter span, or a reduced chord.

Examples include the series of Nieuport military aircraft—from the Nieuport 10 through to the Nieuport 27 which formed the backbone of the Allied air forces between 1915 and 1917. The performance of the Nieuport sesquiplanes was so impressive that the Idflieg (the German Inspectorate of flying troops) requested their aircraft manufacturers to produce copies, an effort which was aided by several captured aircraft and detailed drawings; one of the most famed copies was the Siemens-Schuckert D.I. The Albatros D.III and D.V, which had also copied the general layout from Nieuport, similarly provided the backbone of the German forces during the First World War. The Albatros sesquiplanes were widely acclaimed by their aircrews for their maneuverability and high rate of climb.

During interwar period, the sesquiplane configuration continued to be popular, with numerous types such as the Nieuport-Delage NiD 42/52/62 series, Fokker C.Vd & e, and Potez 25, all serving across a large number of air forces. In the general aviation sector, aircraft such as the Waco Custom Cabin series proved to be relatively popular. The Saro Windhover was a sesquiplane with the upper wing smaller than the lower, which was a much rarer configuration than the reverse. The Pfalz D.III also featured a somewhat unusual sesquiplane arrangement, possessing a more substantial lower wing with two spars that eliminated the flutter problems encountered by single-spar sesquiplanes.

== History ==
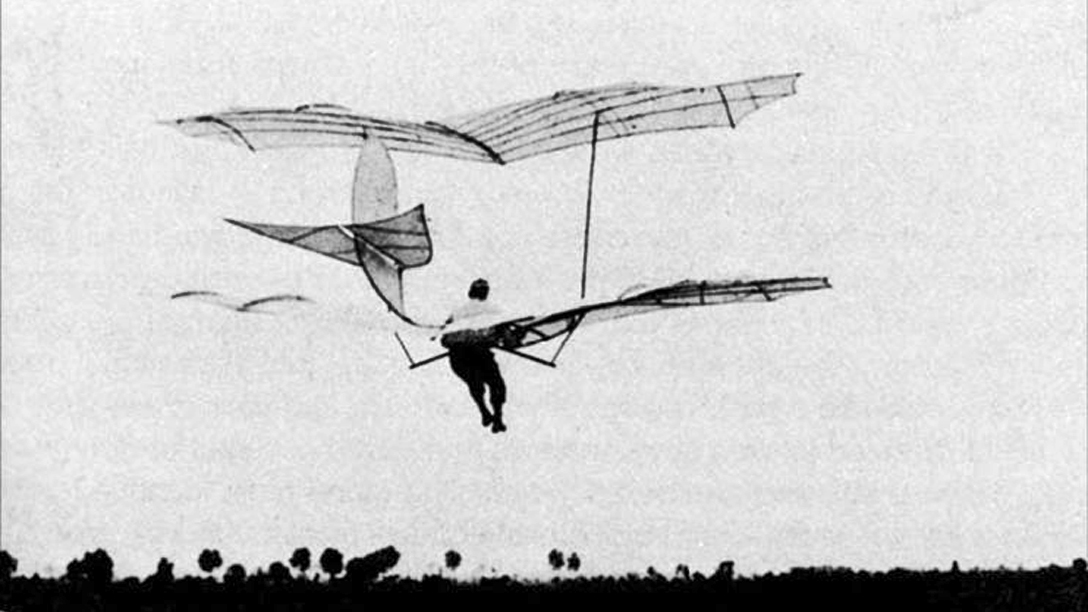
Otto Lilienthal flying his Large Biplane in Lichterfelde (near Berlin) on October 19, 1895

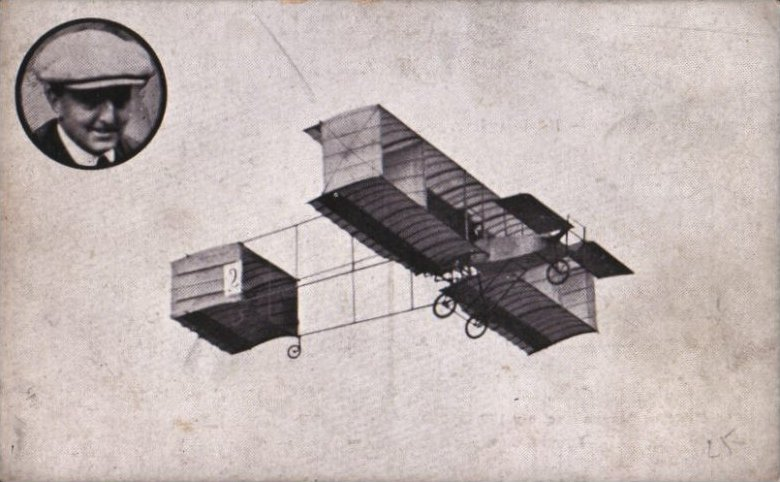
1909 Voisin biplane, with "curtains" connecting the upper and lower wings

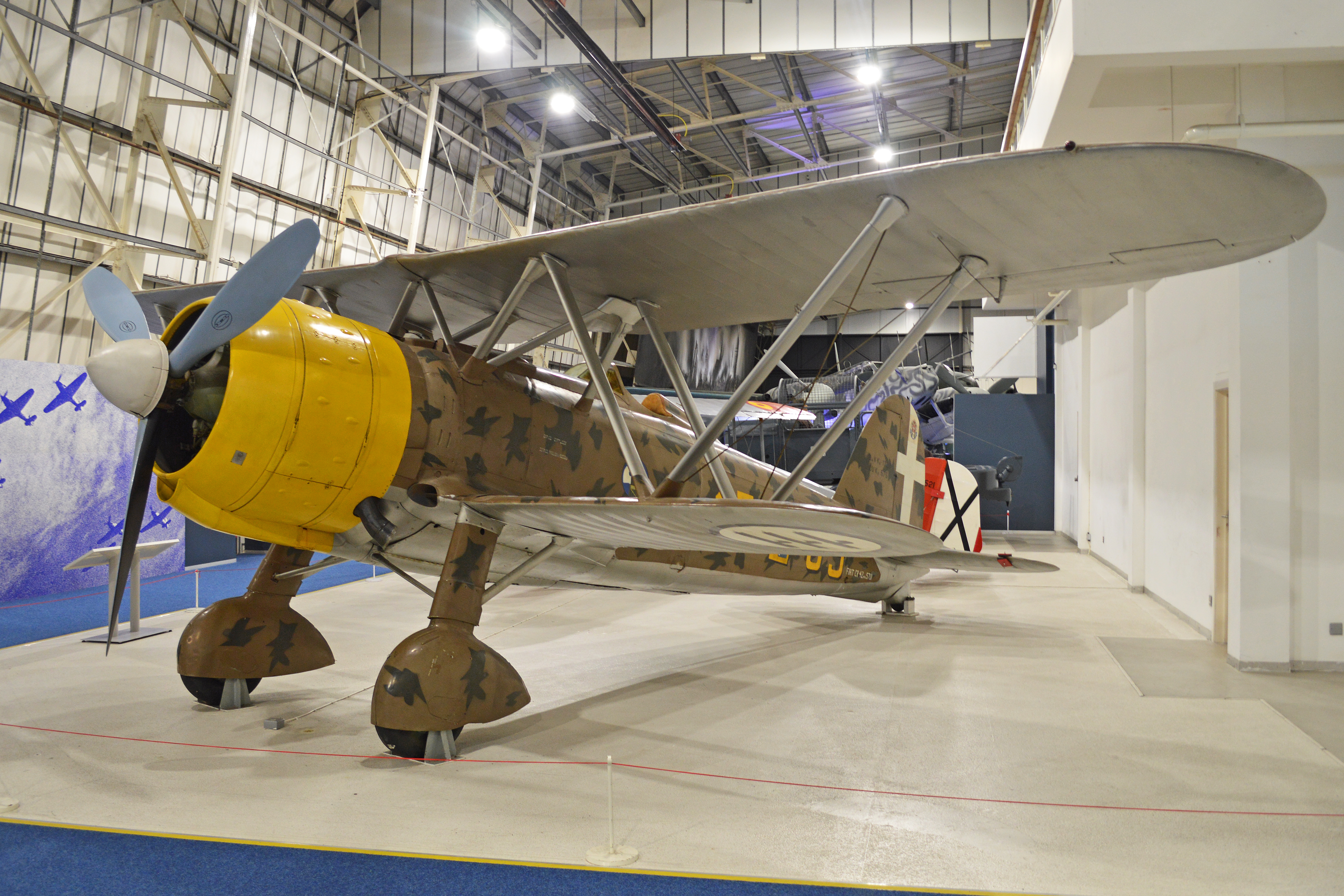
Late 1930s Fiat CR.42 Falco with Warren truss interplane struts which reduced the work needed in rigging a biplane

Hillson Bi-mono with slip-wing. The aircraft could take off as a biplane, jettison the upper, disposable wing, and continue flying as a monoplane. A single example was built, which successfully demonstrated jettisoning of the slip wing in flight

The stacking of wing planes was suggested by Sir George Cayley in 1843. Hiram Maxim adopted the idea for his steam-powered test rig, which lifted off but was held down by safety rails, in 1894. Otto Lilienthal designed and flew two different biplane hang gliders in 1895, though he is better known for his monoplanes. By 1896 a group of young men in the United States, led by Octave Chanute, were flying hang gliders including biplanes and concluded that the externally braced biplane offered better prospects for powered flight than the monoplane. In 1903, the Wright Flyer biplane became the first successful powered aeroplane.

Throughout the pioneer years, both biplanes and monoplanes were common, but by the outbreak of the First World War biplanes had gained favour after several monoplane structural failures resulted in the RFC's "Monoplane Ban" when all monoplanes in military service were grounded, while the French also withdrew most monoplanes from combat roles and relegated them to training. Figures such as aviation author Bruce observed that there was an apparent prejudice held even against newly designed monoplanes, such as the Bristol M.1, that caused even those with relatively high performance attributes to be overlooked in favour of 'orthodox' biplanes, and there was an allegedly widespread belief held at that time that monoplane aircraft were inherently unsafe during combat.

Between the years of 1914 and 1925, a clear majority of new aircraft introduced were biplanes; however, during the latter years of the First World War, the Germans had been experimenting with a new generation of monoplanes, such as the Fokker D.VIII, that might have ended the biplane's advantages earlier had the conflict not ended when it had. The French were also introducing the Morane-Saulnier AI, a strut-braced parasol monoplane, although the type was quickly relegated to the advanced trainer role following the resolution of structural issues. Sesquiplane types, which were biplanes with abbreviated lower wings such as the French Nieuport 17 and German Albatros D.III, offered lower drag than a conventional biplane while being stronger than a monoplane.

During the Interwar period, numerous biplane airliners were introduced. The British de Havilland Dragon was a particularly successful aircraft, a straightforward design which could carry six passengers on busy routes, such as London-Paris services. During early August 1934, one such aircraft, named Trail of the Caribou, performed the first non-stop flight between the Canadian mainland and Britain in 30 hours 55 minutes, although the intended target for this long-distance flight had originally been Baghdad, Iraq. Despite its relative success, British production of the Dragon was quickly ended in favour of the more powerful and elegant de Havilland Dragon Rapide, which had been specifically designed to be a faster and more comfortable successor to the Dragon.

As the available engine power and speed increased, the drag penalty of external bracing increasingly limited aircraft performance. To fly faster, it would be necessary to reduce external bracing to create an aerodynamically clean design; however, early cantilever designs were either too weak or too heavy. The 1917 Junkers J.I sesquiplane utilized corrugated aluminum for all flying surfaces, with a minimum of struts; however, it was relatively easy to damage the thin metal skin and required careful handling by ground crews. The 1918 Zeppelin-Lindau D.I fighter was an all-metal stressed-skin monocoque fully cantilevered biplane, but its arrival had come too late to see combat use in the conflict.

By the 1930s, biplanes had reached their performance limits, and monoplanes become increasingly predominant, particularly in continental Europe where monoplanes had been increasingly common from the end of World War I. At the start of World War II, several air forces still had biplane combat aircraft in front line service but they were no longer competitive, and most were used in niche roles, such as training or shipboard operation, until shortly after the end of the war. The British Gloster Gladiator biplane, the Italian Fiat CR.42 Falco and Soviet I-153 sesquiplane fighters were all still operational after 1939. According to aviation author Gianni Cattaneo, the CR.42 was able to achieve success in the defensive night fighter role against RAF bombers that were striking industrial targets throughout northern Italy.

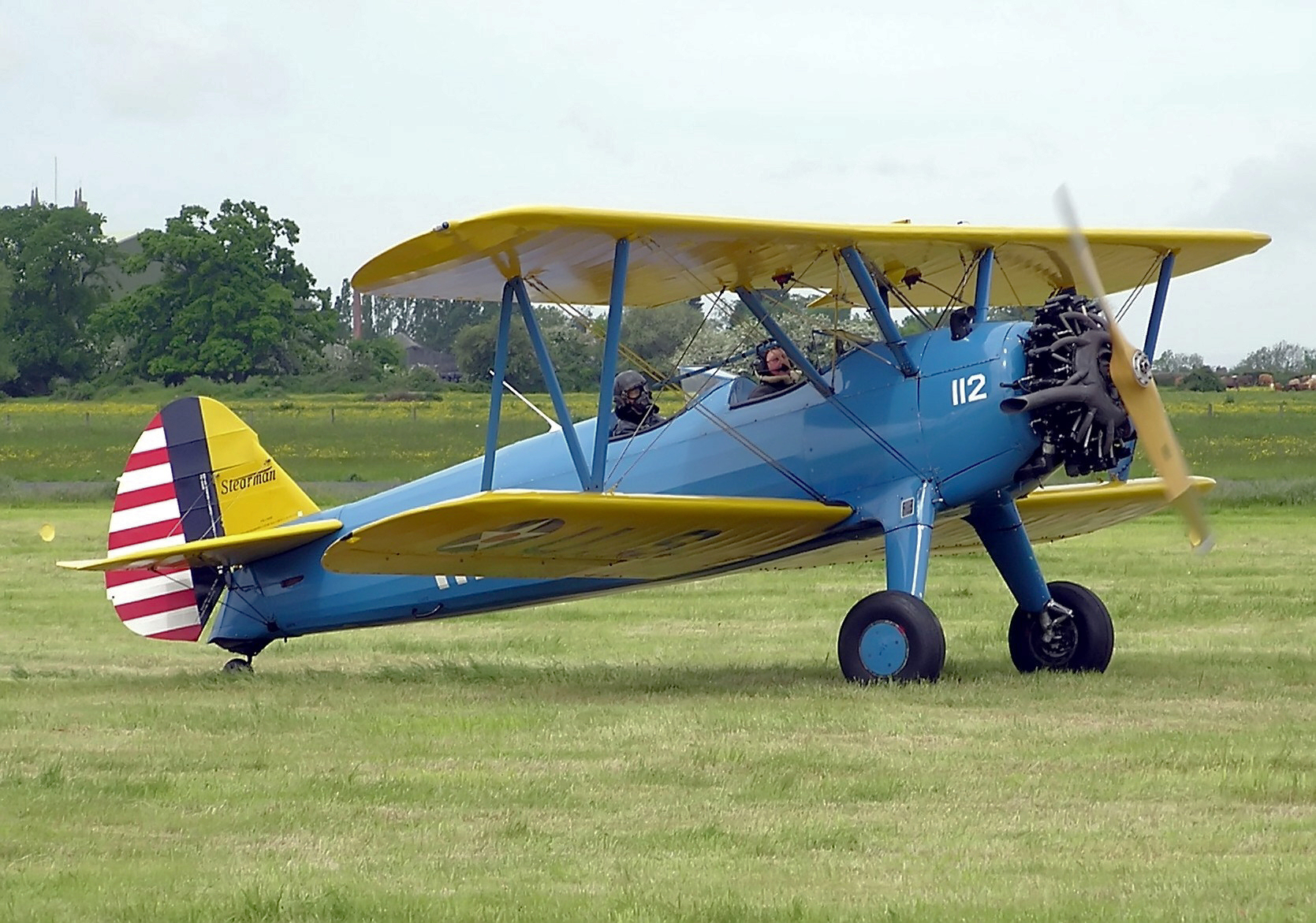
Boeing-Stearman Model 75 PT-13D biplane trainer from the 30s and 40s

The British Fleet Air Arm operated the Fairey Swordfish torpedo bomber from its aircraft carriers, and used the type in the anti-submarine warfare role until the end of the conflict, largely due to their ability to operate from the relatively compact decks of escort carriers. Its low stall speed and inherently tough design made it ideal for operations even in the often severe mid-Atlantic weather conditions. By the end of the conflict, the Swordfish held the distinction of having caused the destruction of a greater tonnage of Axis shipping than any other Allied aircraft.

Both the German Heinkel He 50 and the Soviet Polikarpov Po-2 were used with relative success in the night ground attack role throughout the Second World War. In the case of the Po-2, production of the aircraft continued even after the end of the conflict, not ending until around 1952. A significant number of Po-2s were fielded by the Korean People's Air Force during the Korean War, inflicting serious damage during night raids on United Nations bases. The Po-2 is also the only biplane to be credited with a documented jet-kill, as one Lockheed F-94 Starfire was lost while slowing down to 161 km/h (100 mph) – below its stall speed – during an intercept in order to engage the low flying Po-2.

Later biplane trainers included the de Havilland Tiger Moth in the Royal Air Force (RAF), Royal Canadian Air Force (RCAF) and others and the Stampe SV.4, which saw service postwar in the French and Belgian Air Forces. The Stearman PT-13 was widely used by the United States Army Air Force (USAAF) while the US Navy operated the Naval Aircraft Factory N3N. In later civilian use in the US, the Stearman became particularly associated with stunt flying such as wing-walking, and with crop dusting, where its compactness worked well at low levels, where it had to dodge obstacles.

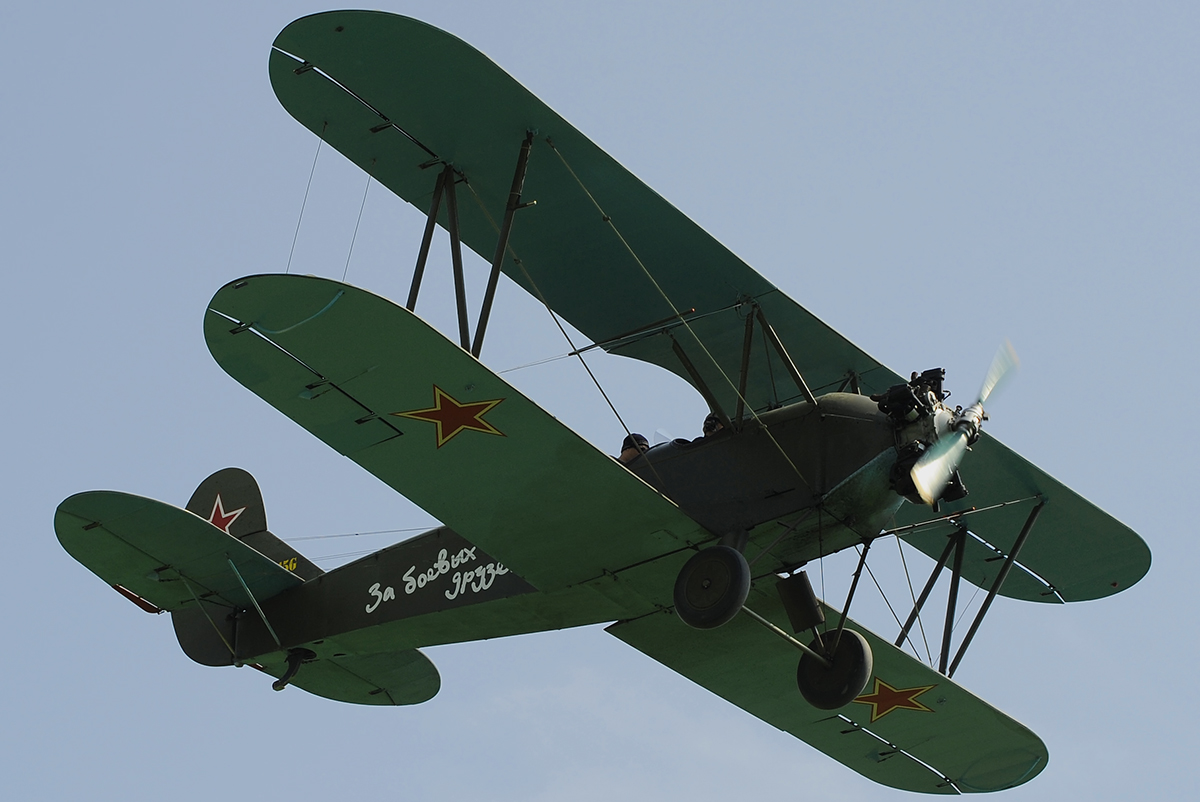
Polikarpov Po-2, of which over 20,000 were built by the Soviet Union

Modern biplane designs still exist in specialist roles such as aerobatics and agricultural aircraft with the competition aerobatics role and format for such a biplane well-defined by the mid-1930s by the Udet U 12 Flamingo and Waco Taperwing. The Pitts Special dominated aerobatics for many years after World War II and is still in production.

The vast majority of biplane designs have been fitted with reciprocating engines. Exceptions include the Antonov An-3 and WSK-Mielec M-15 Belphegor, fitted with turboprop and turbofan engines respectively. Some older biplane designs, such as the Grumman Ag Cat are available in upgraded versions with turboprop engines.

The two most produced biplane designs were the 1913 British Avro 504 of which 11,303 were built, and the 1928 Soviet Polikarpov Po-2 of which over 20,000 were built, with the Po-2 being the direct replacement for the Soviet copy of the Avro 504. Both were widely used as trainers. The Antonov An-2 was very successful too, with more than 18,000 built.

=== Ultralight aircraft ===
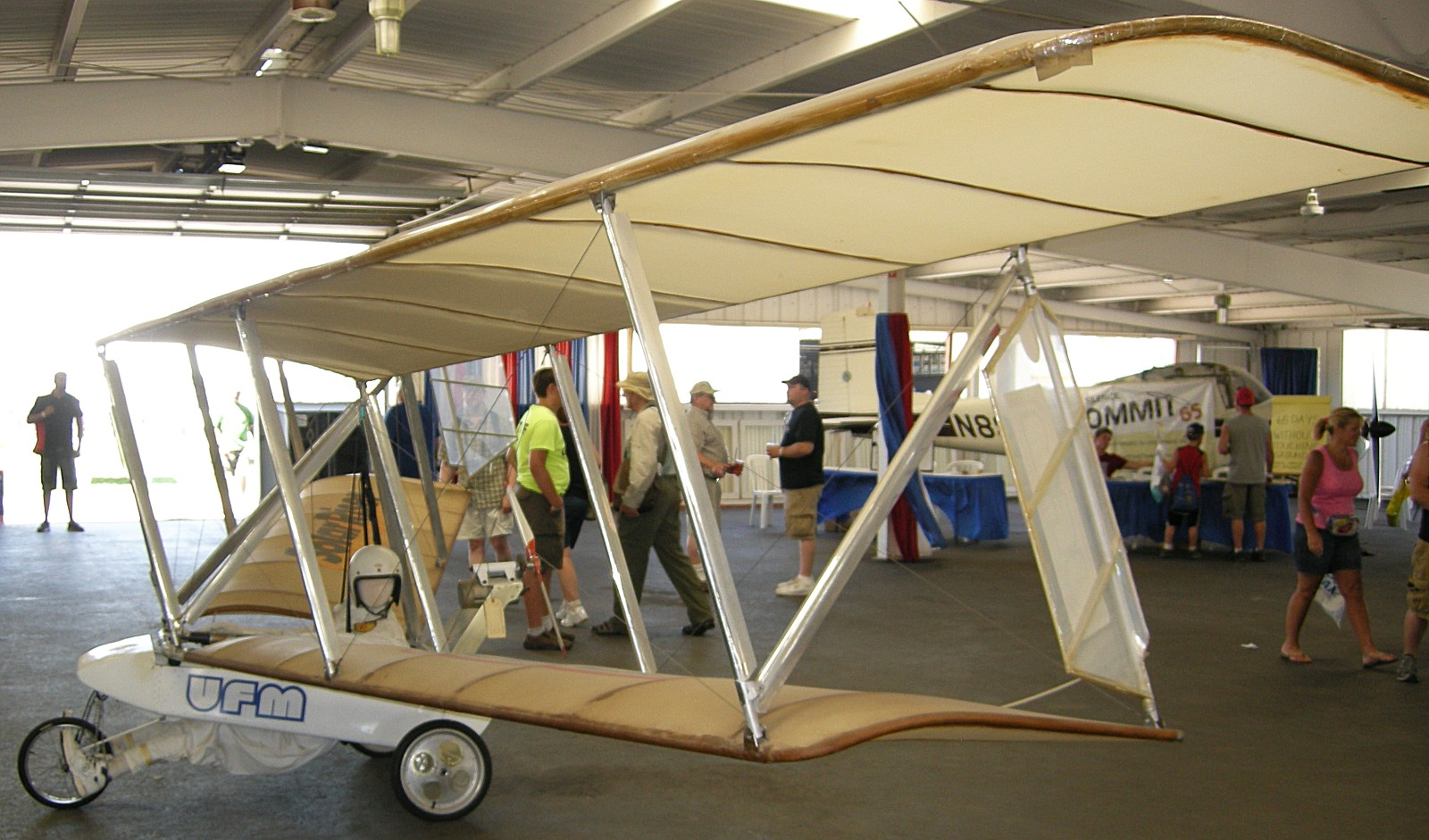
Mauro Solar Riser electric-powered ultralight biplane

Although most ultralights are monoplanes, the low speeds and simple construction involved have inspired a small number of biplane ultralights, such as Larry Mauro's Easy Riser (1975–). Mauro also made a version powered with solar cells driving an electric motor called the Solar Riser. Mauro's Easy Riser was used by "Father Goose", Bill Lishman.

Other biplane ultralights include the Belgian-designed Aviasud Mistral, the German FK12 Comet (1997–), the Lite Flyer Biplane, the Sherwood Ranger, and the Murphy Renegade.

== Avian evolution ==
The feathered dinosaur Microraptor gui glided, and perhaps even flew, on four wings, which may have been configured in a staggered sesquiplane arrangement. This was made possible by the presence of flight feathers on both forelimbs and hindlimbs, with the feathers on the forelimbs opening to a greater span. It has been suggested that the hind limbs could not have opened out sideways but in flight would have hung below and slightly behind the fore limbs.

== See also ==
- History of aviation
- Multiplane (aeronautics)
- Wing configuration
