= Lilienthal Normalsegelapparat =

First serially produced glider

Normalsegelapparat
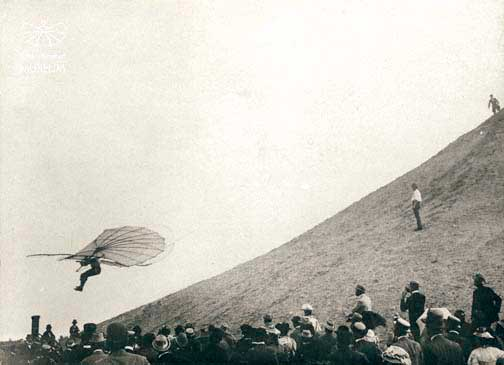
- Lichterfelde (near Berlin), 29 June 1895

General information
- Type: Glider
- National origin: Germany
- Manufacturer: Otto Lilienthal
- Designer: Otto Lilienthal
- Number built: 10

History
- First flight: 1893

The Lilienthal Normalsegelapparat (German: "Normal soaring apparatus") is a glider designed by Otto Lilienthal in Germany in the late 19th century. It is considered to be the first aeroplane to be serially produced, examples being made between 1893 and 1896.

Nine examples are known to have been sold, the buyers including Nikolai Zhukovsky and William Randolph Hearst. Three original "normal gliders" are preserved in museums in London, Moscow, and Washington, and a fragment of one is preserved in Munich. A similar glider, the Sturmflügelapparat ("storm wing apparatus") is preserved in the Technisches Museum in Vienna.

Lilienthal's flights using this glider typically achieved a distance of 250 m (820 ft) starting from the top of the launching mound that he had constructed. A bow frame or "Prellbügel" was used to reduce the impact in case of a crash. Later the Normalsegelapparat was developed into a biplane.

An authentic replica of the Normalsegelapparat made by the Otto Lilienthal Museum has been investigated by the German Aerospace Center in wind tunnel and flight tests. The results proved that the glider was stable in pitch and roll and can be flown safely at moderate altitudes.

== Specifications (typical) ==
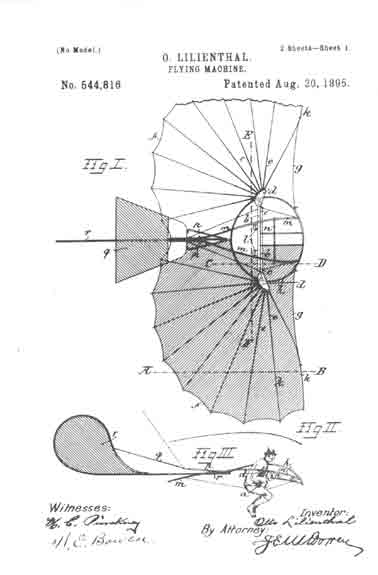
US-patent: Lilienthal flying machine

Data from

General characteristics

- Crew: One
- Length: 5.30 m (17 ft 5 in)
- Wingspan: 6.70 m (22 ft 0 in)
- Wing area: 13.6 m^{2} (146 sq ft)
- Empty weight: 20 kg (44 lb)

Performance

- Maximum glide ratio: 4
