= Otto Lilienthal =

German aviation pioneer (1848–1896)

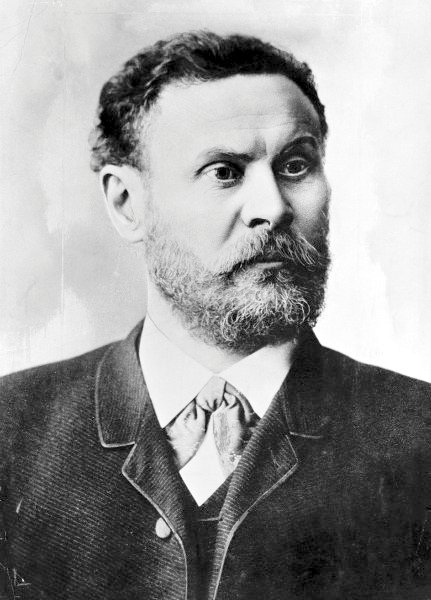
- Lilienthal, c. 1895
- Born: Karl Wilhelm Otto Lilienthal; 23 May 1848; Anklam, Province of Pomerania, Kingdom of Prussia, German Confederation
- Died: 10 August 1896 (aged 48); Berlin, Province of Brandenburg, Kingdom of Prussia, German Empire
- Cause of death: Cervical fracture sustained in a hang glider crash
- Resting place: Lankwitz Cemetery, Berlin
- Education: College Mechanical Engineer Major
- Occupation: Engineer
- Known for: Successful gliding experiments; "Father of Aviation"
- Spouse: Agnes Fischer (m. 1878–1896)
- Children: 4
- Relatives: Gustav Lilienthal (brother)

Signature
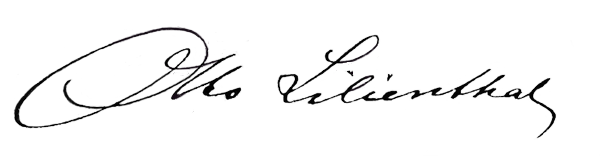

Karl Wilhelm Otto Lilienthal (German pronunciation: [ˈkaʁl ˈvɪlhɛlm ˈʔɔto ˈliːliəntaːl]; 23 May 1848 – 10 August 1896) was a German pioneer of aviation who became known as the "flying man". He was the first person to make well-documented, repeated, successful flights with gliders, therefore making the idea of heavier-than-air aircraft a reality. Newspapers and magazines published photographs of Lilienthal gliding, favourably influencing public and scientific opinion about the possibility of flying machines becoming practical.

Lilienthal's work led to his developing the concept of the modern wing. His flight attempts in 1891 are seen as the beginning of human flight and the "Lilienthal Normalsegelapparat" is considered the first airplane in series production, making the Maschinenfabrik Otto Lilienthal in Berlin the first airplane production company in the world. He has been referred to as the "father of aviation" and "father of flight".

On 9 August 1896, Lilienthal's glider stalled and he was unable to regain control. Falling from about 15 metres (49 ft), he broke his neck and died the next day.

== Early life ==
Lilienthal was born on 23 May 1848 in Anklam, Pomerania Province, in the German kingdom of Prussia. His parents were Gustav and Caroline, née Pohle. He was baptised in the evangelical-lutheran St. Nicholas church and confirmed in St. Mary's church in Anklam. Lilienthal's middle-class parents had eight children, but only three survived infancy: Otto, Gustav, and Marie. The brothers worked together all their lives on technical, social, and cultural projects. Lilienthal attended grammar school and studied the flight of birds with his brother Gustav (1849–1933). Fascinated by the idea of manned flight, Lilienthal and his brother made strap-on wings, but failed in their attempts to fly. He attended the regional technical school in Potsdam for two years and trained at the Schwarzkopf Company before becoming a professional design engineer. He later attended the Technische Hochschule in Berlin (now Technische Universität Berlin).

He began experiments in earnest in 1867 on the force of air, but interrupted the work to serve in the Franco-Prussian War. Returning to civilian life, he was a staff engineer with several engineering companies and received his first patent, for a mining machine. He founded his own company to make boilers and steam engines.

He married Agnes Fischer in June 1878, daughter of a deputy. Music brought them together; she was trained in piano and voice while Lilienthal played the French horn and had a good tenor voice. After marriage, they took up residence in Berlin and had four children: Otto, Anna, Fritz, and Frida. Lilienthal published his famous book Birdflight as the Basis of Aviation in 1889.

== Experiments in flight ==
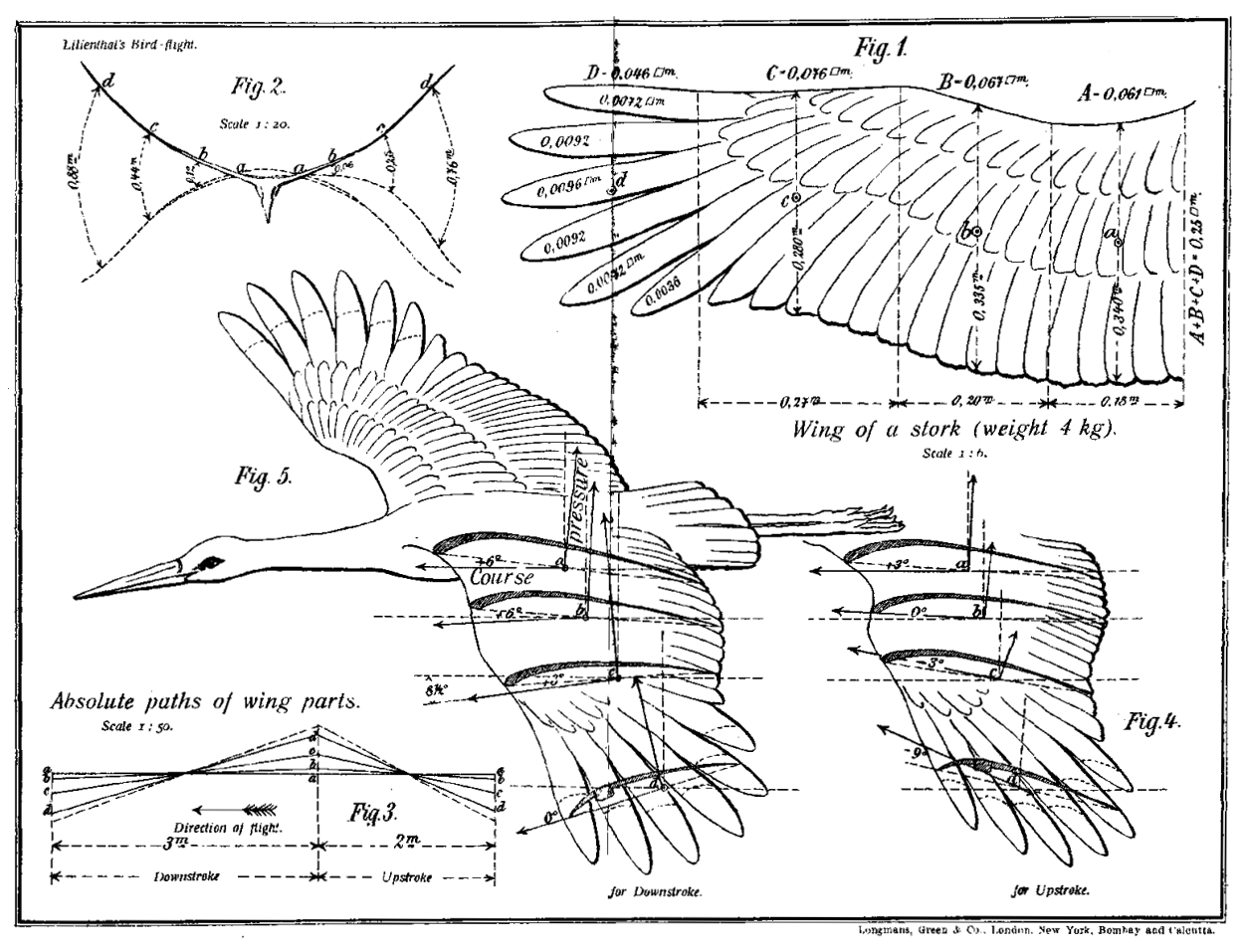
Mechanics of white stork flight in his Der Vogelflug als Grundlage der Fliegekunst (1889)

Lilienthal's greatest contribution was in the development of heavier-than-air flight. He made his flights from an artificial hill he built near Berlin and from natural hills, especially in the Rhinow region.

A U.S. patent filed in 1894 by Lilienthal directed pilots to grip the "bar" for carrying and flying the hang glider. The A-frame of Percy Pilcher and Lilienthal echoes in today's control frame for hang gliders and ultralight aircraft. Working in conjunction with his brother Gustav, Lilienthal made over 2,000 flights in gliders of his design starting in 1891 with his first glider version, the Derwitzer Glider, until his death in a gliding crash in 1896. His total flying time was five hours.

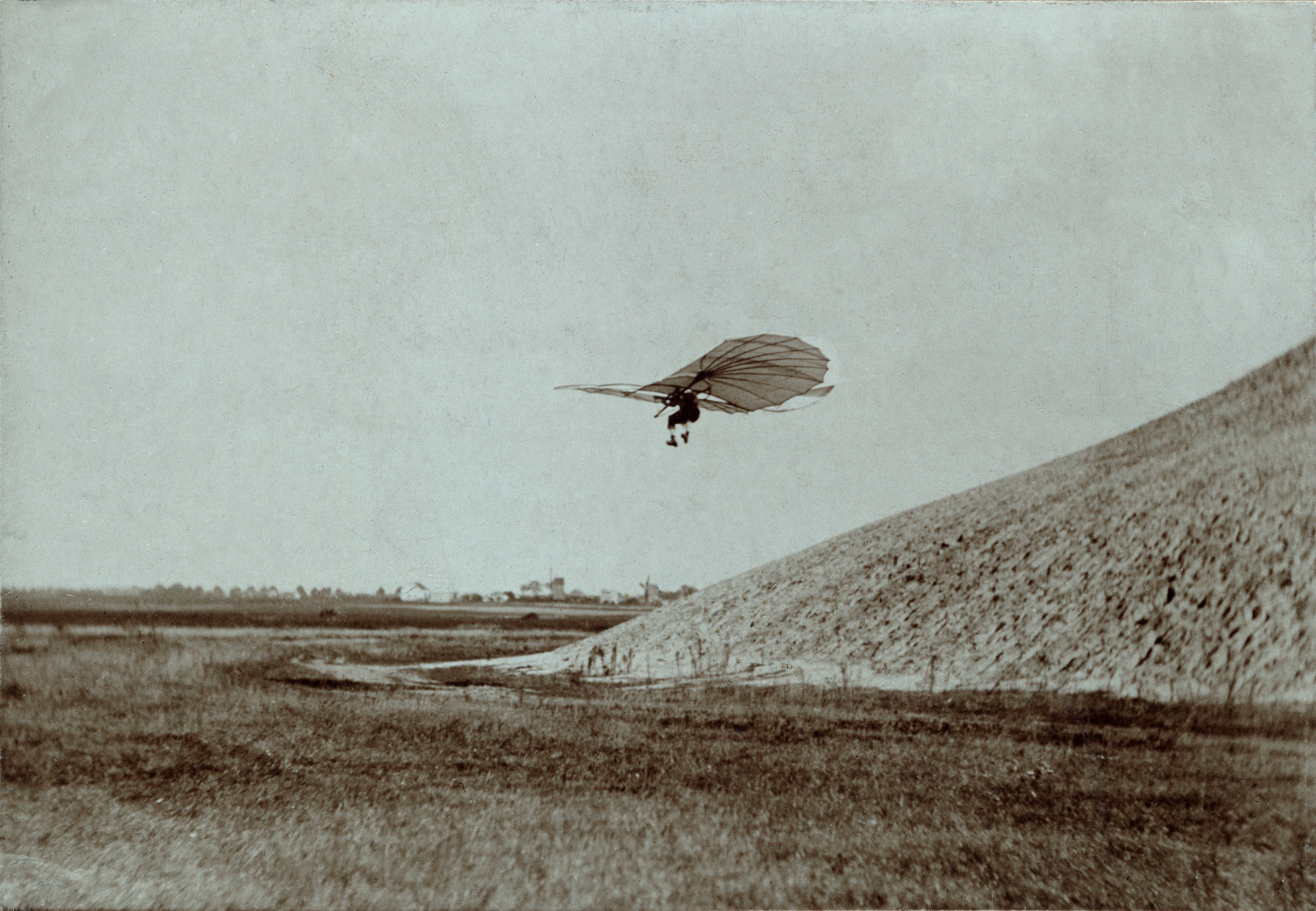
Lilienthal in mid-flight, Berlin c. 1895

At the beginning, in the spring of 1891, Lilienthal managed the first jumps and flights on the slope of a sand pit on a hill between the villages of Derwitz and Krielow in Havelland, west of Potsdam (52°24′48″N 12°49′22″E). This is the site of man's first flight. Later he made his flight attempts on an artificial hill near Berlin and above all in the Rhinow Hills. In 1891 Lilienthal succeeded with jumps and flights covering a distance of about 25 metres (82 ft). He could use the updraft of a 10-metre-per-second (33 ft/s) wind against a hill to remain stationary with respect to the ground, shouting to a photographer on the ground to manoeuvre into the best position for a photo. In 1893, in the Rhinow Hills, he was able to achieve flight distances as long as 250 metres (820 ft). This record remained unbeaten for him or anyone else at the time of his death.

Lilienthal did research in accurately describing the flight of birds, especially storks, and used polar diagrams for describing the aerodynamics of their wings. He made many experiments in an attempt to gather reliable aeronautical data.

=== Projects ===
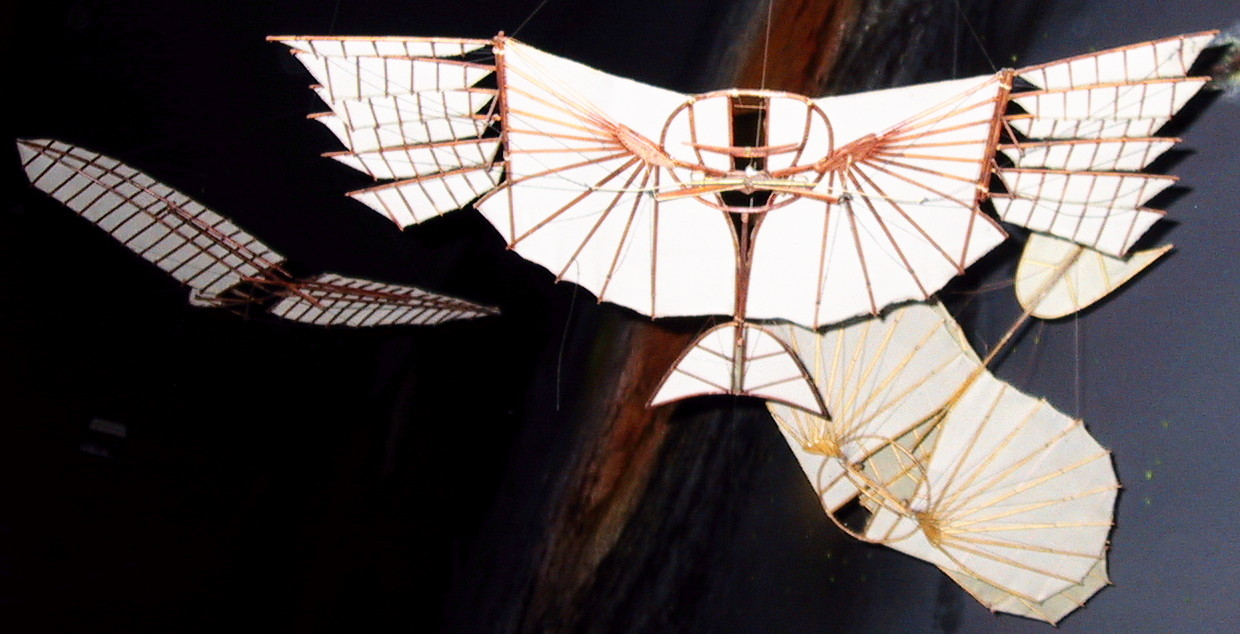
Models of his gliders

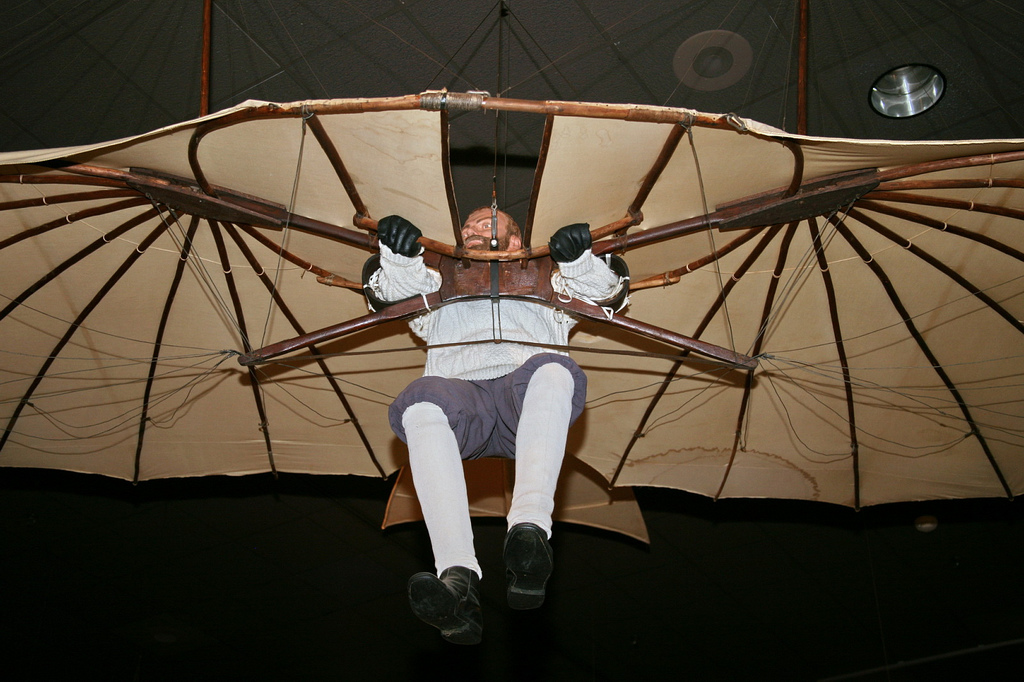
Restored 1894 glider displayed at the National Air and Space Museum in Washington, D.C. It is one of five surviving Lilienthal gliders in the world.

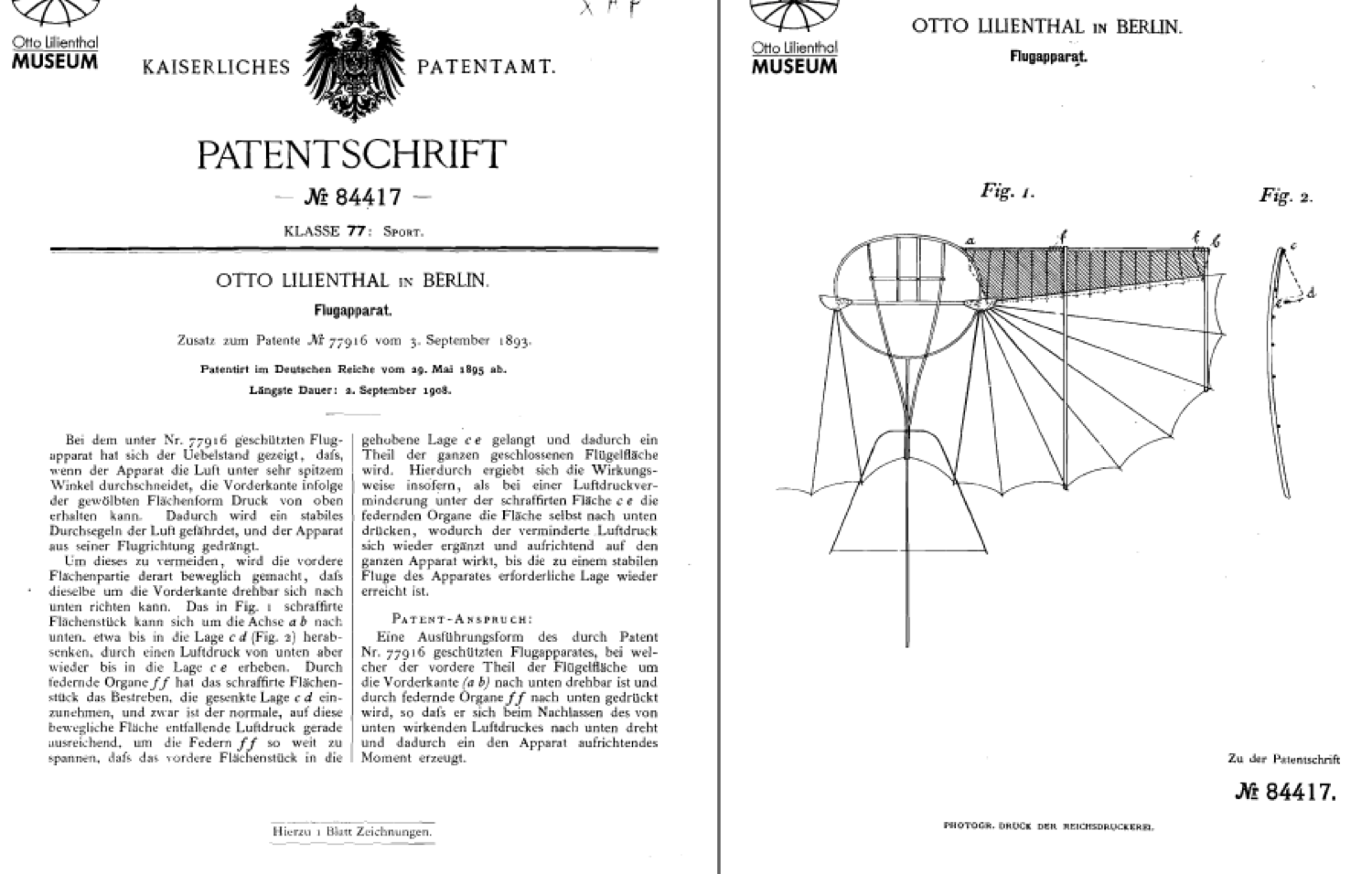
1893 patent filing showing bird-wing design for a glider

During his short flying career, Lilienthal developed a dozen models of monoplanes, wing flapping aircraft and two biplanes. His gliders were carefully designed to distribute weight as evenly as possible to ensure a stable flight. Lilienthal controlled them by changing the center of gravity by shifting his body, much like modern hang gliders. They were difficult to manoeuvre and had a tendency to pitch down, from which it was difficult to recover. One reason for this was that he held the glider by his shoulders, rather than hanging from it like a modern hang glider. Only his legs and lower body could be moved, which limited the amount of weight shift he could achieve.

Lilienthal made many attempts to improve stability with varying degrees of success. These included making a biplane which halved the wing span for a given wing area, and by having a hinged tailplane that could move upwards to make the flare at the end of a flight easier. He speculated that flapping wings of birds might be necessary and had begun work on such a powered aircraft.

Aircraft produced by Otto Lilienthal
Name	Date	Wing			Glider		Notes
Name	Date	Span (ft)	Area (sq ft)	Max. length (ft)	Length (ft)	Weight (kg)	Notes
Derwitzer Glider	1891	25 (later 18)	108 (later 84)	6.6	12.8	18	Wing curvature: 1/10 of length.
Südende Glider	1892	31	158	8.2	3.3	24	Wing curvature: 1/20 of length.
Maihöhe Rhinow Glider	1893	22 or 23	150	8.2	14.3	20	
Small Ornithopter	1893–1896	22	129	8.2	5.5		Weight with CO2 cylinder: 10 kg.
Normal soaring apparatus	1894	22–23	140–146	7.9 / 8.2	16.1 – 17.4	20	At least nine gliders sold. Original gliders or fragments are preserved in museums in London, Moscow, Munich and Washington.
Sturmflügelmodell	1894	20	104	6.6	14.8		Original can be seen at the Technisches Museum Wien.
Experimental Monoplane "Vorflügelapparat"	1895	29	204	9.8	18.4		
Small Biplane	1895	19.7 / 17.1	104 / 105	7.2 / 6.9	15.7		
Large Biplane	1895	21.6 / 20.7	146 / 112	7.5 / 7.5	16.1		
Big Ornithopter	1896	27.9	188	8.2	17.4		

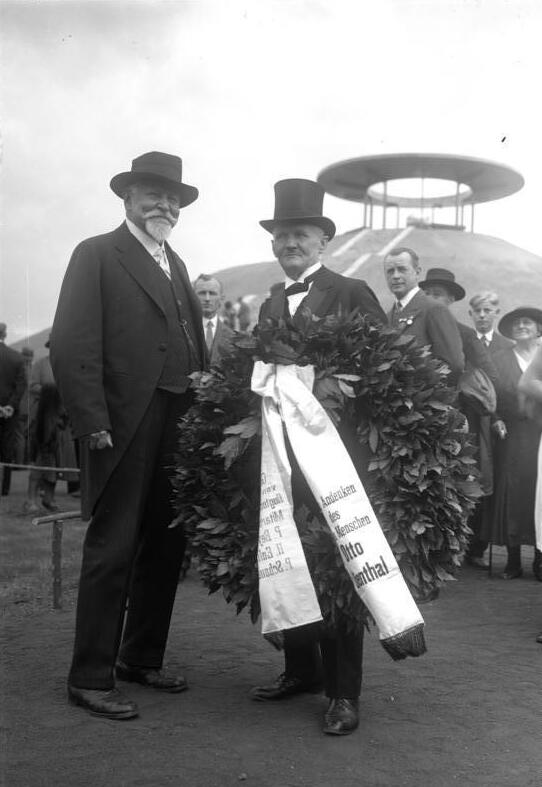
The unveiling ceremony of the new monument in Berlin. Gustav (left) and Paul Baylich, August 1932

While his lifelong pursuit was flight, Lilienthal was also an inventor and devised a small engine that worked on a system of tubular boilers. His engine was much safer than the other small engines of the time. This invention gave him the financial freedom to focus on aviation. His brother Gustav (1849–1933) was living in Australia at the time, and Lilienthal did not engage in aviation experiments until his brother's return in 1885.

There are 25 known Lilienthal patents.

=== Test locations ===
Lilienthal performed his first gliding attempts in the spring of 1891 at the so-called "Spitzer Berg" near to the villages of Krielow and Derwitz, west of Potsdam. His training area in 1892 was a hill formation called "Maihöhe" in Steglitz, Berlin. He built a 4 metres (13 ft) high shed, in the shape of a tower, on top of it. This way, he obtained a "jumping off" place 10 metres (33 ft) high. The shed served also for storing his apparatus.

He also started to perform gliding attempts in 1893 in the "Rhinower Berge", at the "Hauptmannsberg" near to Rhinow and later, in 1896, at the "Gollenberg" near Stölln. He built an artificial conical hill in 1894 near his home in Lichterfelde, called Fliegeberg (lit. flight hill). It allowed him to launch his gliders into the wind no matter which direction it was coming from. The hill was 15 metres (49 ft) high. There was a regular crowd of people that were interested in seeing his gliding experiments.

== Worldwide notice ==
Reports of Lilienthal's flights spread in Germany and elsewhere, with photographs appearing in scientific and popular publications. Among those who photographed him were pioneers such as Ottomar Anschütz and American physicist Robert Williams Wood. He soon became known as the "father of flight" as he had successfully controlled a heavier-than-air aircraft in sustained flight.

Lilienthal was a member of the Verein zur Förderung der Luftschifffahrt, and regularly detailed his experiences in articles in its journal, the Zeitschrift für Luftschifffahrt und Physik der Atmosphäre, and in the popular weekly publication Prometheus. These were translated in the United States, France and Russia. Many people from around the world came to visit him, including Samuel Pierpont Langley from the United States, Russian Nikolai Zhukovsky, Englishman Percy Pilcher and Austrian Wilhelm Kress. Zhukovsky wrote that Lilienthal's flying machine was the most important invention in the aviation field. Lilienthal corresponded with many people, among them Octave Chanute, James Means, Alois Wolfmüller and other flight pioneers.

== Final flight ==
As on previous weekends, Lilienthal went to the Rhinow Hill on 9 August 1896. The day was very sunny and not too hot (about 20 °C, or 68 °F). The first flights were successful, reaching a distance of 250 metres (820 ft) in his normal glider. During the fourth flight Lilienthal's glider pitched upward and then headed down quickly, an apparent aerodynamic stall. Lilienthal had previously had difficulty in recovering from this position because the glider relied on weight shift which was difficult to achieve when pointed at the ground. His attempts failed and he fell from a height of about 15 metres (49 ft), while still in the glider.

His glider mechanic, Paul Beylich, transported him by horse-drawn carriage to Stölln, where he was examined by a physician. Lilienthal had a fracture of the third cervical vertebra and soon fell unconscious. He was transported in a cargo train later that day to Lehrter train station in Berlin, and the next morning to the clinic of Ernst von Bergmann, one of the most famous and successful surgeons in Europe at the time. Lilienthal died there a few hours later, about 36 hours after the crash.

There are differing accounts of his last words. A popular account, inscribed on his tombstone, is "Opfer müssen gebracht werden!" (lit. 'Sacrifices must be made!'). However, the director of the Otto Lilienthal Museum doubts that these were his last words. Otto Lilienthal was buried at Lankwitz public cemetery in Berlin.

Guinness World Records recognizes him as the first person recorded to be fatally injured in a glider accident.

== Legacy ==
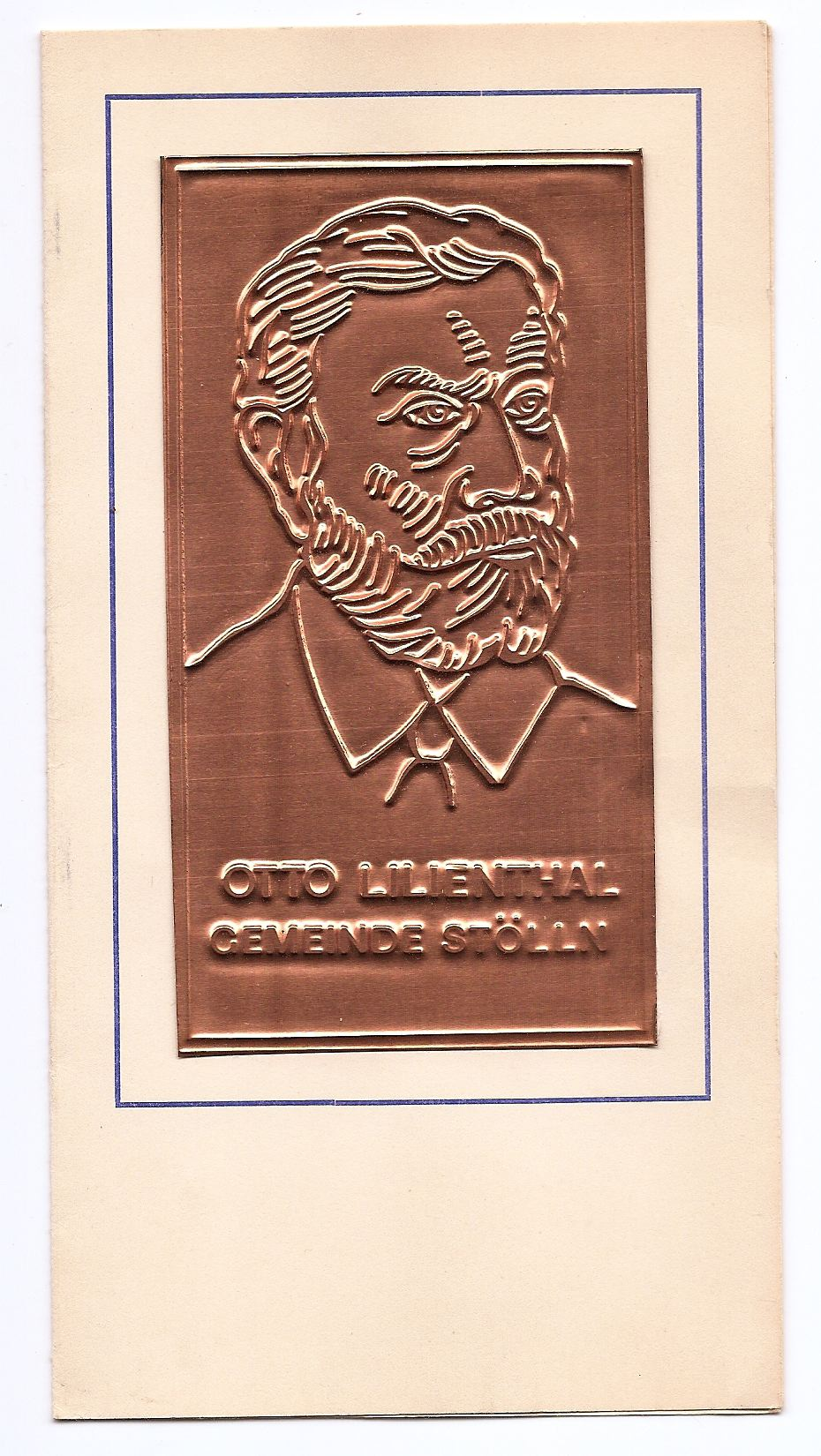
Bronze plaque medal of Stölln, where Lilienthal had his fatal accident

Lilienthal's research was well known to the Wright brothers, and they credited him as a major inspiration for their decision to pursue manned flight. They abandoned his aeronautical data after two seasons of gliding and began using their own wind tunnel data. Wilbur Wright wrote in the September 1912 issue of the Aero Club of America Bulletin that "of all the men who attacked the flying problem in the 19th century, Otto Lilienthal was easily the most important." Orville Wright was in Germany in September 1909, making demonstration flights at Tempelhof aerodrome. He paid a call to Lilienthal's widow and, on behalf of himself and Wilbur, paid tribute to Lilienthal for his influence on aviation and on their own initial experiments in 1899.

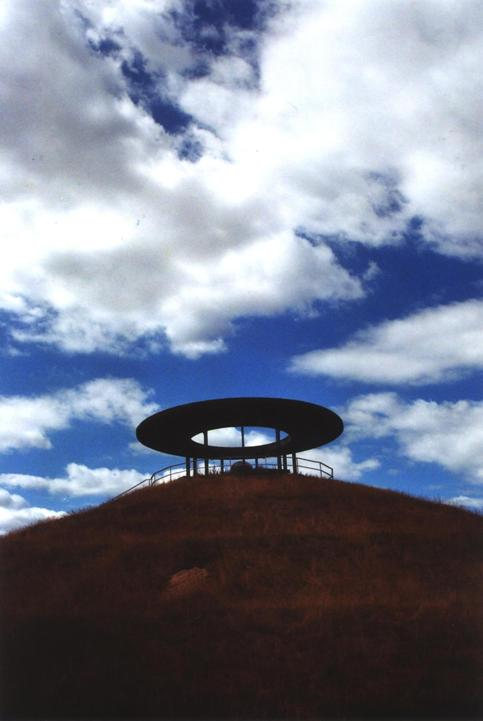
The Lilienthal monument, Fliegeberg, Berlin 2006

The Fliegeberg was redesigned by a Berlin architect Fritz Freymüller in 1932 as a memorial to Lilienthal. On top of the hill was built a small temple-like construction, consisting of pillars supporting a slightly sloping round roof. Inside is placed a silver globe inscribed with particulars of famous flights. Lilienthal's brother Gustav and the old mechanic and assistant Paul Baylich attended the unveiling ceremony on 10 August 1932 (36 years after Otto's death).

The Fédération Aéronautique Internationale (FAI) created an annual award in 1938 called the Lilienthal Gliding Medal for a recent outstanding achievement in gliding. He was inducted into the International Air & Space Hall of Fame in 1972. Aviation magazine Flying ranked Lilienthal No. 19 on their list of the "51 Heroes of Aviation" in 2013. Berlin Tegel "Otto Lilienthal" Airport, the city's busiest airport until its closure in 2020, was named after him.

A Soviet-era Ilyushin IL-62 passenger jet was flown to Gollenberg in 1989, and landed in a nearby field. It now serves as a museum of early flight, and has been named 'Frau Agnes' (German for Lady Agnes), after Lilienthal's wife. The back of the aircraft operates as a registry office, decorated for marriages. The jet previously served with East Germany's state airline Interflug.

A German Air Force tanker, Airbus A310 MRTT registration 10–24, has been named "Otto Lilienthal" in his honour. The Lilium Jet, a prototype German electric vertical take-off and landing (eVTOL) electrically powered airplane and the company which designed it, Lilium GmbH, were named after him. An authentic replica of the Normalsegelapparat made by the Otto Lilienthal Museum has been investigated by the German Aerospace Center in wind tunnel and flight tests. The results prove that the glider is stable in pitch and roll and can be flown safely at moderate altitudes.

== In popular culture ==
- Lilienthal was featured on a commemorative postmark in Berlin in 1953.
- Lilienthal plays a major part (in absentia) in Theodora Goss's short story "The Wings of Meister Wilhelm," nominated for a World Fantasy Award and published in her anthology In the Forest of Forgetting.
- A Lilienthal glider serves as a major plot element in Paul Gazis's Webserial "The Airship Flying Cloud, R-505".
- "Lilienthals Traum" ("Lilienthal's Dream") is a song by Reinhard Mey that charts Lilienthal's flights and death.
- "Lilienthal Berlin" is a German watch brand named after Otto Lilienthal

== Gallery ==
Lilienthal was regularly joined by photographers at his request. Most of them are well known, like Ottomar Anschütz. Lilienthal also took his own photographs of his flying machines after 1891. There are at least 145 known photographs documenting his test flights, some of excellent quality. All of them are available online at the Otto Lilienthal Museum website. The only negatives, preserved in the Deutsches Museum in Munich, were destroyed during World War II.

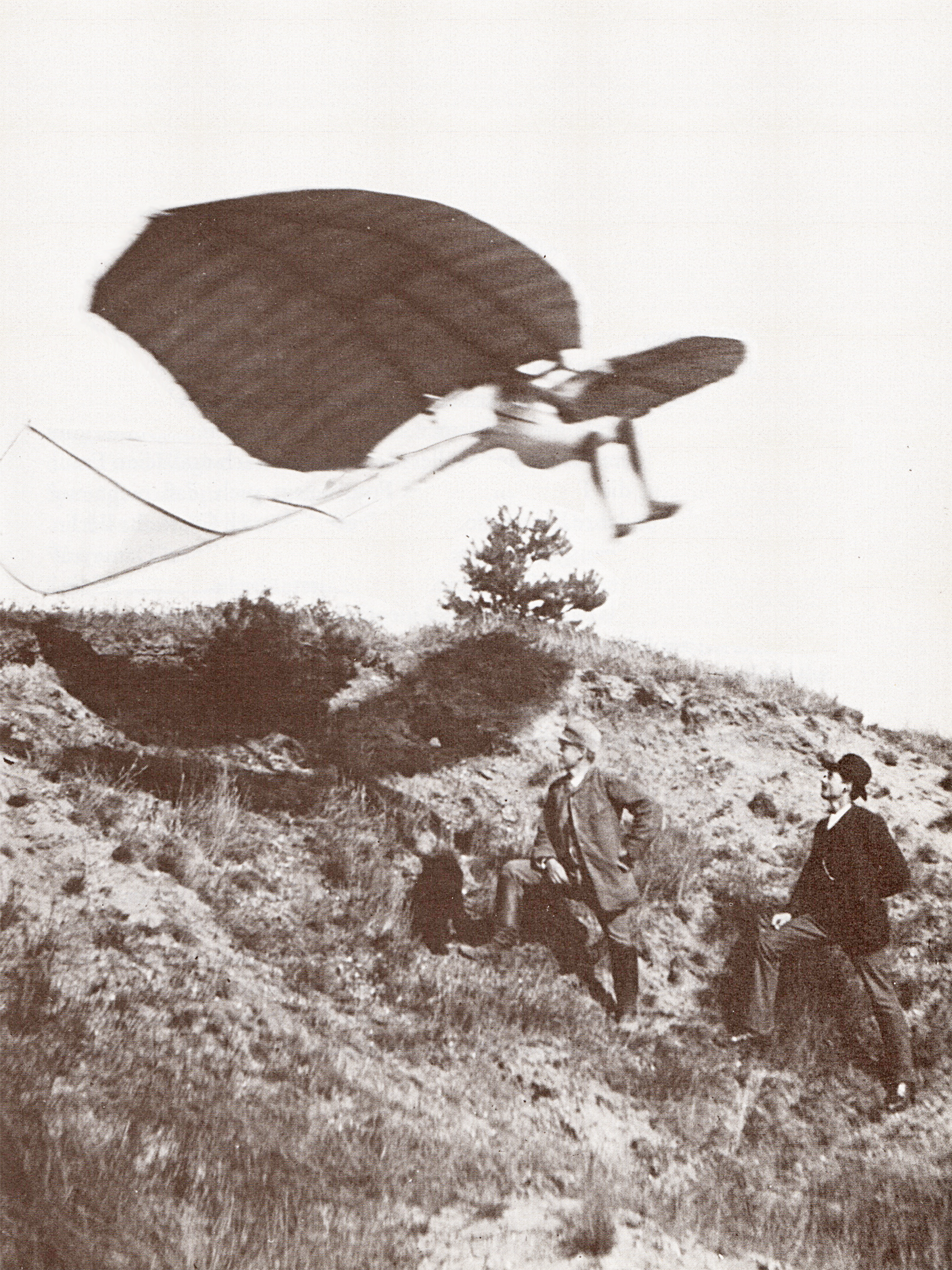
Flight attempt of Lilienthal on the Derwitzer Glider,
Derwitz, 1891

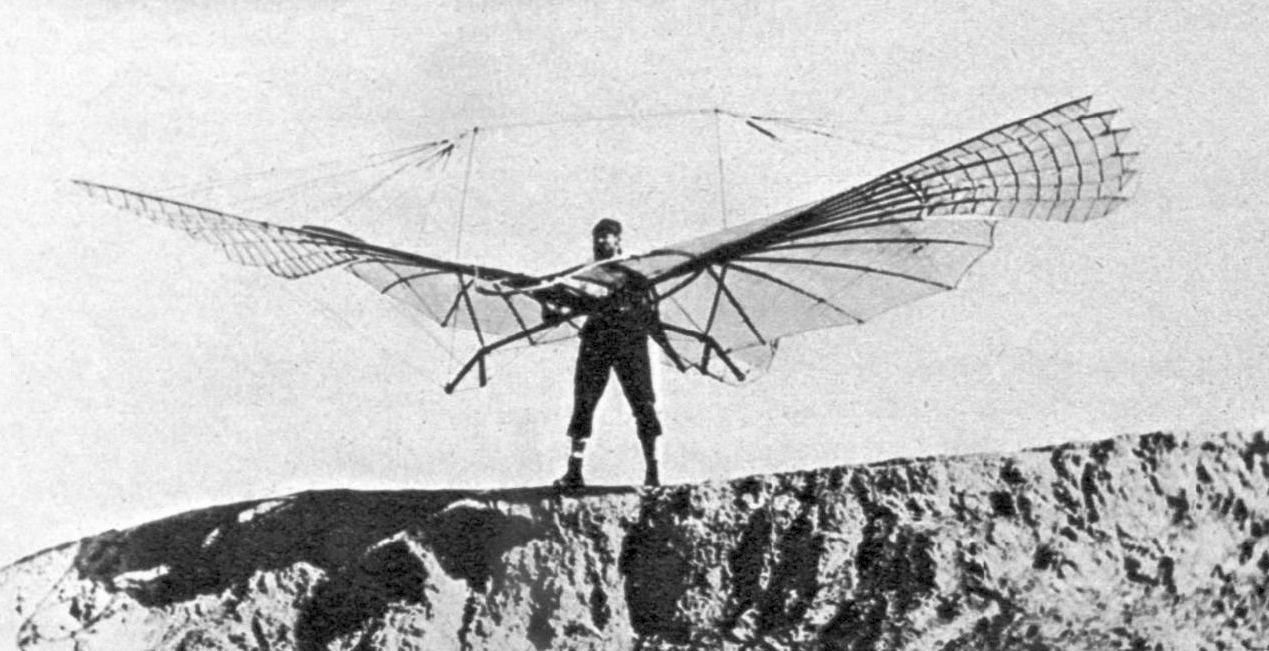
Lilienthal preparing for a Small Ornithopter flight,
16 August 1894

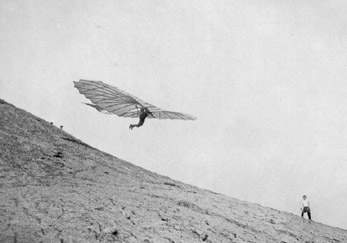
Vorflügelapparat,
29 May 1895

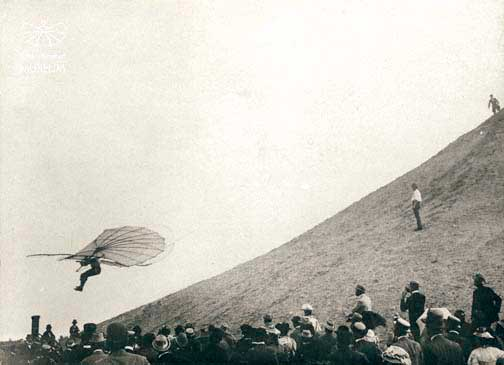
Normal soaring apparatus with the enlarged tail,
29 June 1895

== See also ==
- Lilienthal Gliding Medal
- Otto Lilienthal Museum
- Aviation history
- Albrecht Berblinger
- Abbas Ibn Firnas
- George Cayley
- Jean-Marie Le Bris
- John Joseph Montgomery
- German inventors and discoverers
