= Alois Wolfmüller =

German engineer and inventor

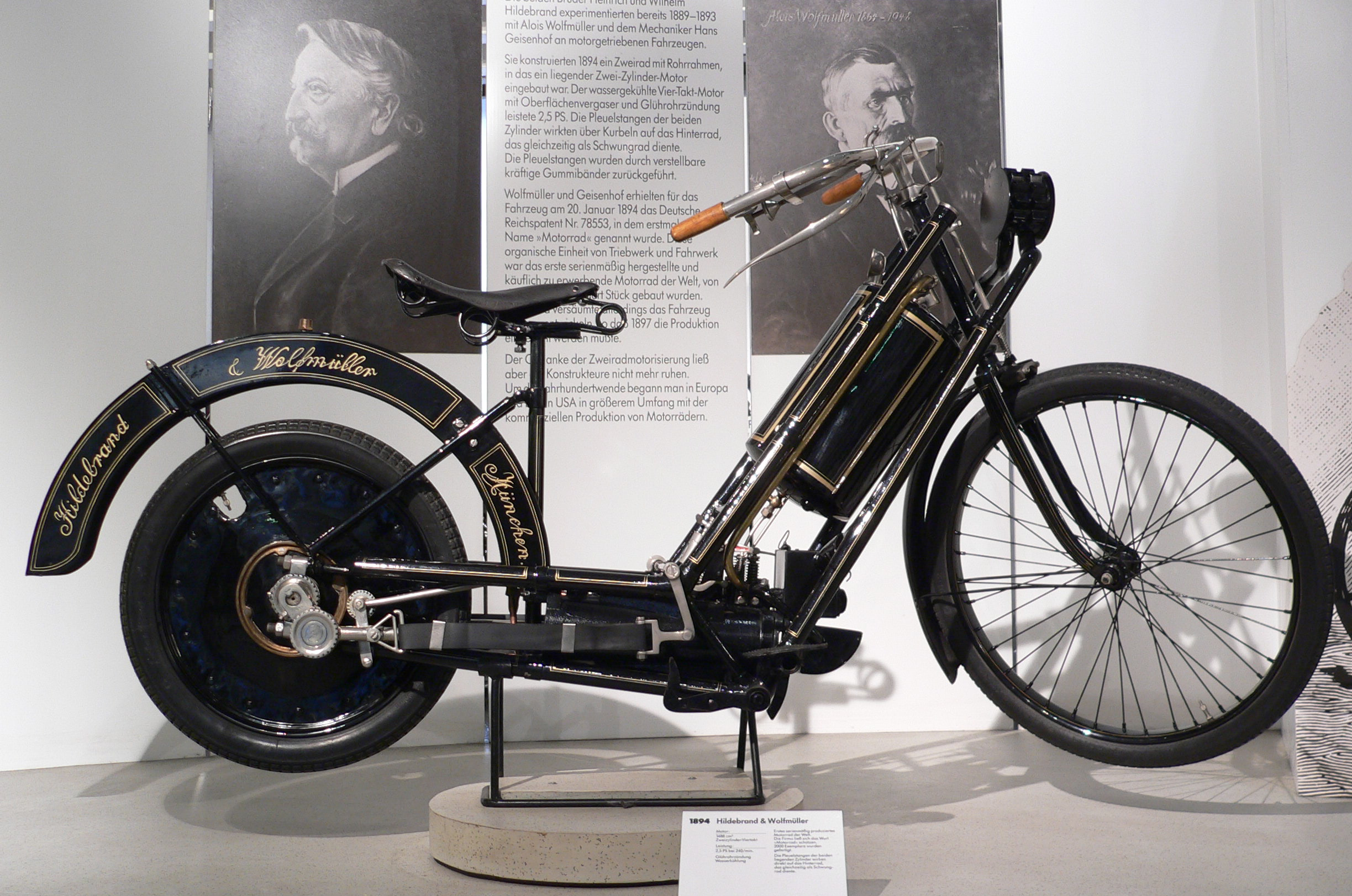
Hildebrand und Wolfmüller, 1894 in Zweirad-Museum Neckarsulm

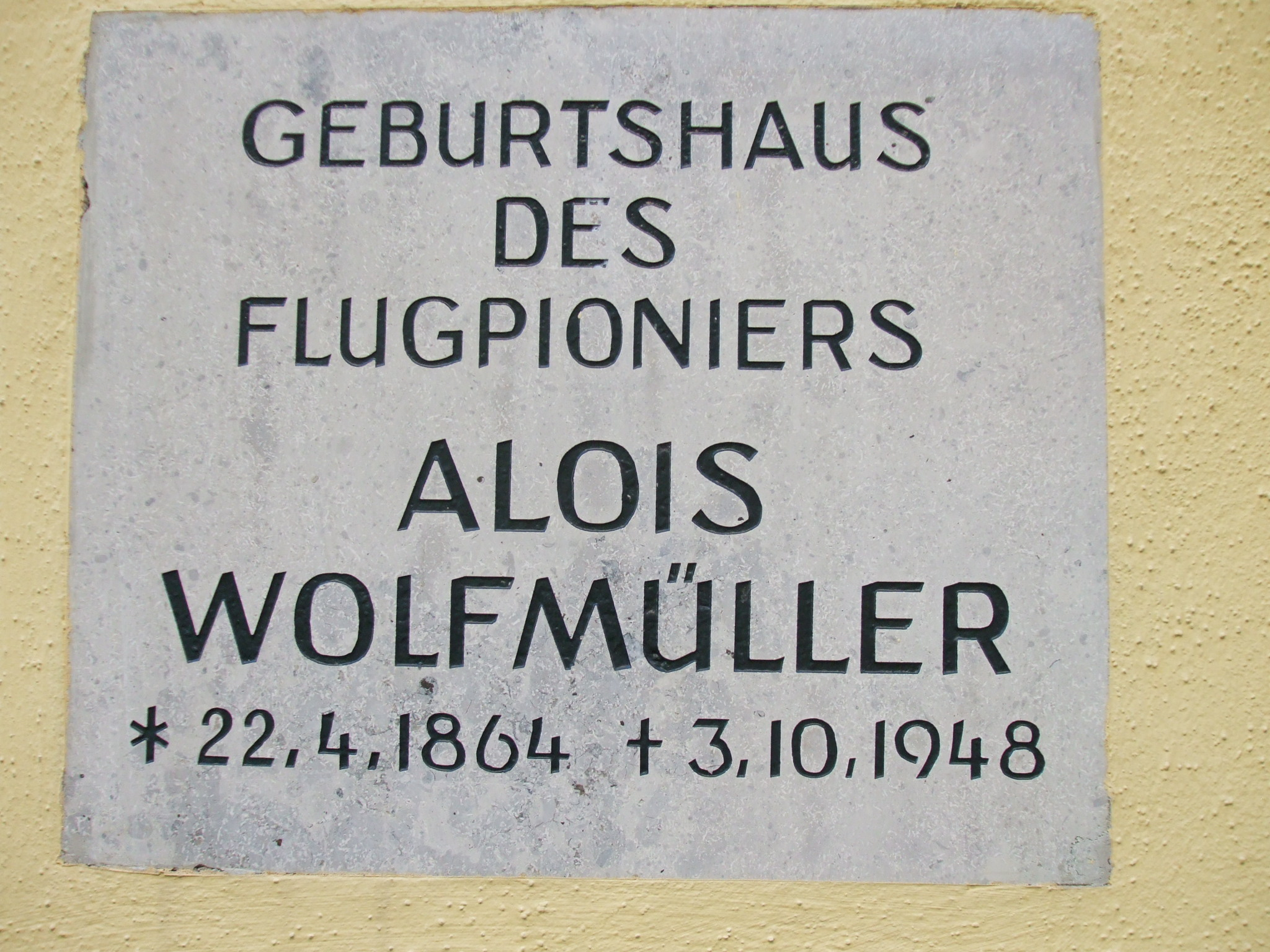
Commemorative plaque in Landsberg am Lech

Alois Wolfmüller (24 April 1864 – 3 October 1948) was a German engineer and inventor.

== Life ==
Wolfmüller was born in Landsberg am Lech. Together with Heinrich and Wilhelm Hildebrand he developed the Hildebrand & Wolfmüller motorcycle. Heinrich and Wilhelm Hidebrand were steam-engine engineers before they teamed up with Alois Wolfmüller to produce their internal combustion Motorrad in Munich in 1894.

Wolfmüller was a friend of German pioneer Otto Lilienthal and developed different kind of early flying objects.

He died, aged 84, in Oberstdorf.
