= Derwitzer glider =

One of the first successful manned aircraft

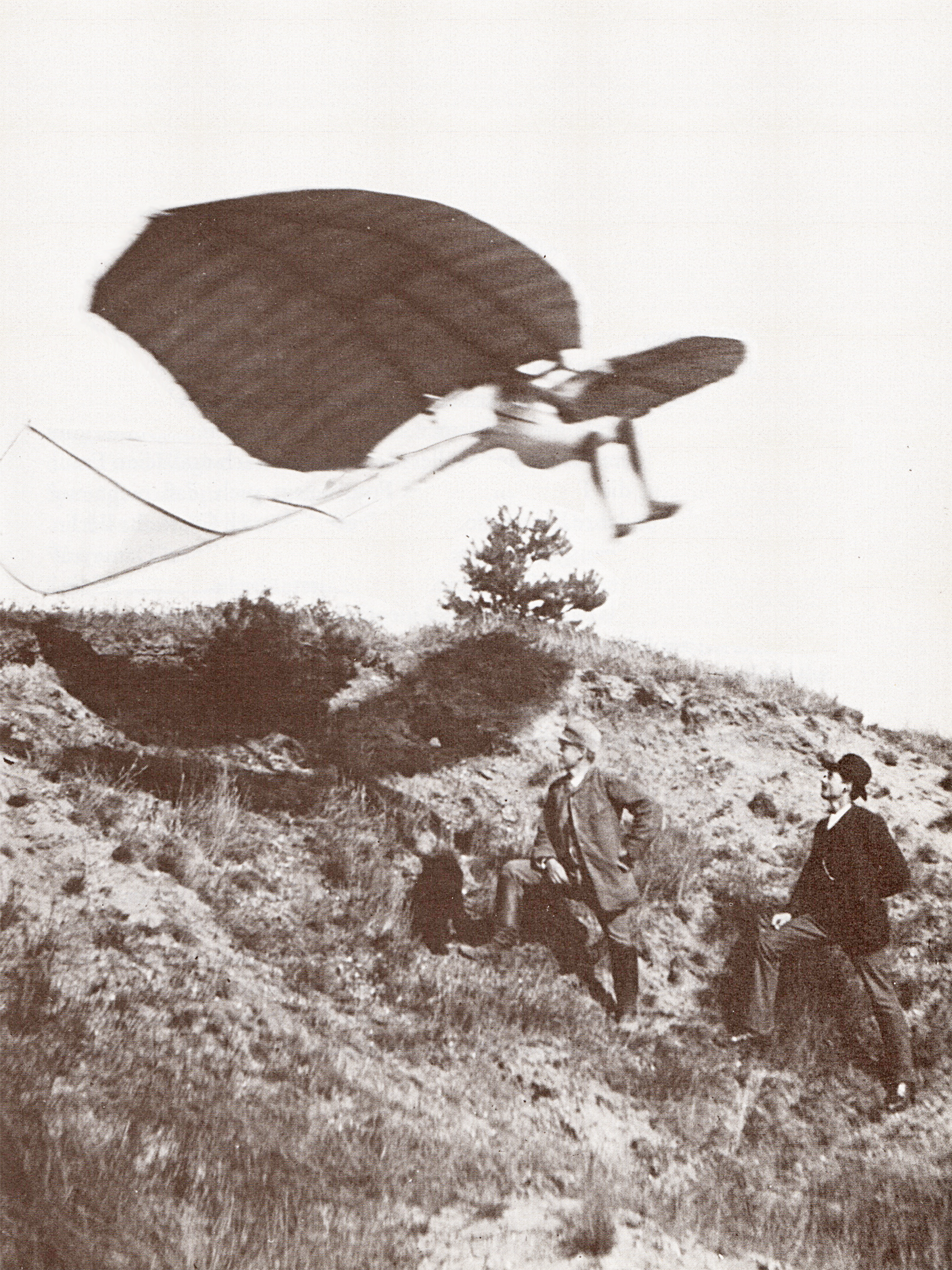
- The Derwitzer glider in flight with Lilienthal as pilot, 1891. First photo of a human in flight, by Carl Kassner.

General information
- Type: Experimental glider
- National origin: Germany
- Manufacturer: Otto Lilienthal
- Designer: Otto Lilienthal

History
- First flight: 1891

The Derwitzer glider was a glider that was developed by Otto Lilienthal, so named because it was tested near Derwitz (nowadays part of Werder (Havel)) in Brandenburg. It first flew in 1891 and became one of the first successful manned aircraft in the world. Lilienthal used it to make flights of up to 25 metres (80 feet).

== Specifications ==
General characteristics

- Crew: One (pilot)
- Length: 3.90 m (12 ft 10 in)
- Wingspan: 7.62 m (25 ft 0 in) originally; 5.5 m (18 ft) later
- Wing area: 10.0 m^{2} (108 sq ft)
- Empty weight: 18 kg (40 lb)
