= Otto Lilienthal Museum =

Biographical museum in Anklam, Germany

Coordinates: 53°51′14″N 13°42′17″E

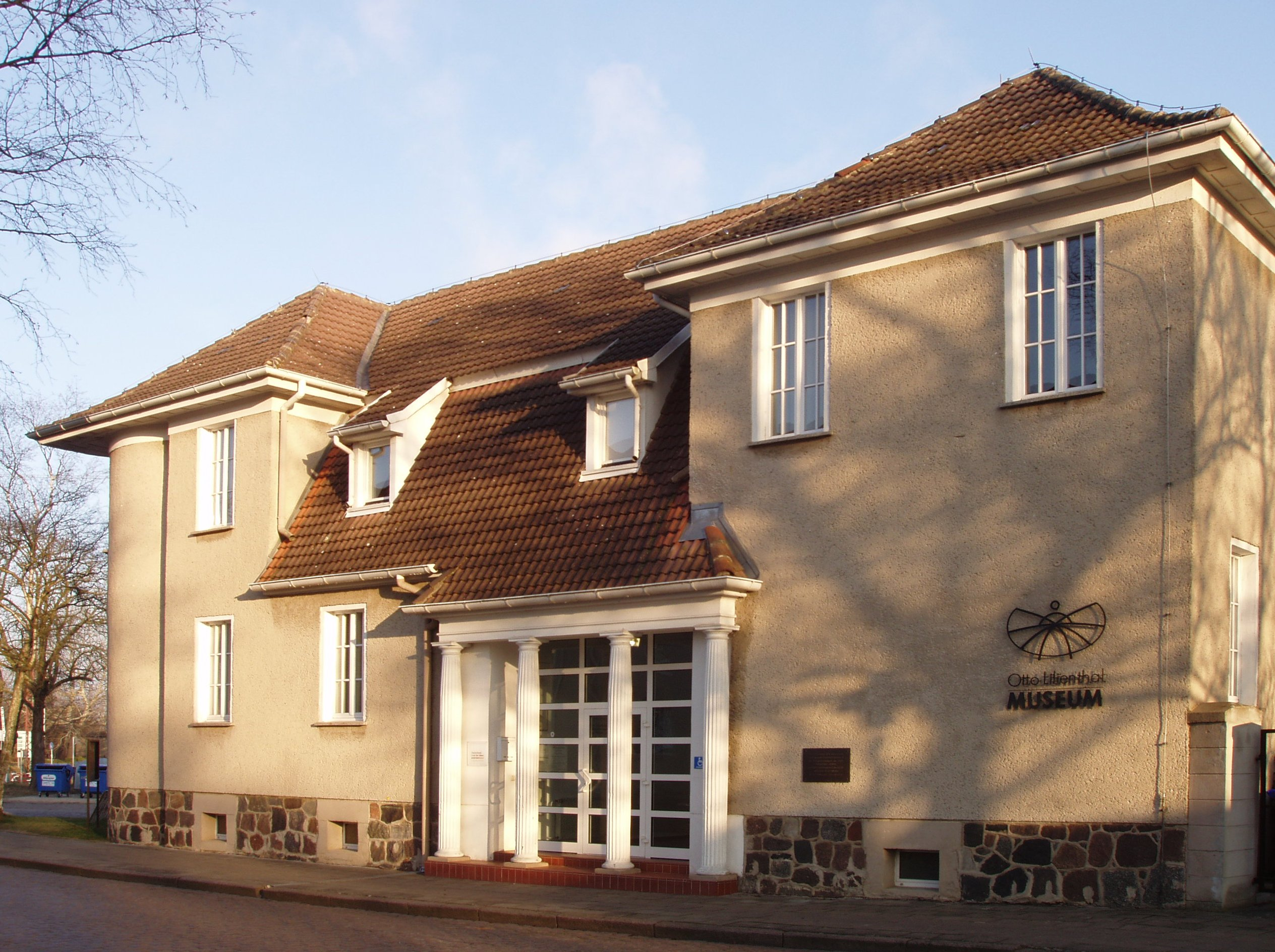
Otto Lilienthal Museum

Otto Lilienthal Museum, Anklam

The Otto Lilienthal Museum in Anklam (Germany) is a museum dedicated to the "glider king" Otto Lilienthal, the flight pioneer, as well as a pioneer in technical, social and cultural projects. Lilienthal made over 2,000 flights in gliders of his design starting in 1891 with his first glider version, the Derwitzer, until his death in a gliding crash in 1896. His total flying time was five (5) hours.

== History ==
The town of Anklam is Lilienthal's birthplace. Various objects belonging to the life and work of Otto Lilienthal, among them a reconstruction of a glider from the year 1925 have been part of a local history museum, founded in 1927. The Otto-Lilienthal-Museum was opened in 1991 as a biographical technical museum. Today the museum houses the largest collection of Lilienthal aircraft in reconstruction.

== Collections ==
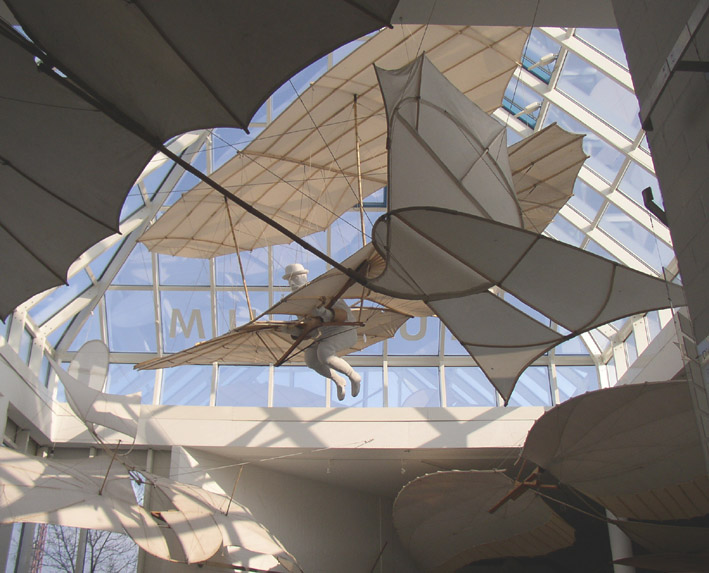
A proper view of the exhibition

The museum archives contain everything that is known about the first successful glider pilot, essays, documents, including a photo archive, replica and models of all known gliders and aircraft of Lilienthal. Moreover, the brothers Otto and Gustav Lilienthal were very prolific inventors of steam engines, toys, as well as initiators of numerous social and cultural projects.

The museum acquired a large collection of hang gliders and shows models of aircraft, from the time before the first successful flights, represent the early history of aviation and the prehistory of the aircraft.

== Awards ==
In 1996 the museum has been awarded the title "FAI Recognized Museum" from the International Organization of Aeronautics FAI, and in 1999 the museum was the first one in the former East-Germany area which was awarded a "European Museum of the Year Award - Special Commendation" by the European Museum Forum. The state minister for culture and media of the Fed. Rep. of Germany awarded the museum the title "German National Memorial" since 2001.
