= Early flying machines =

Aircraft developed before the modern aeroplane

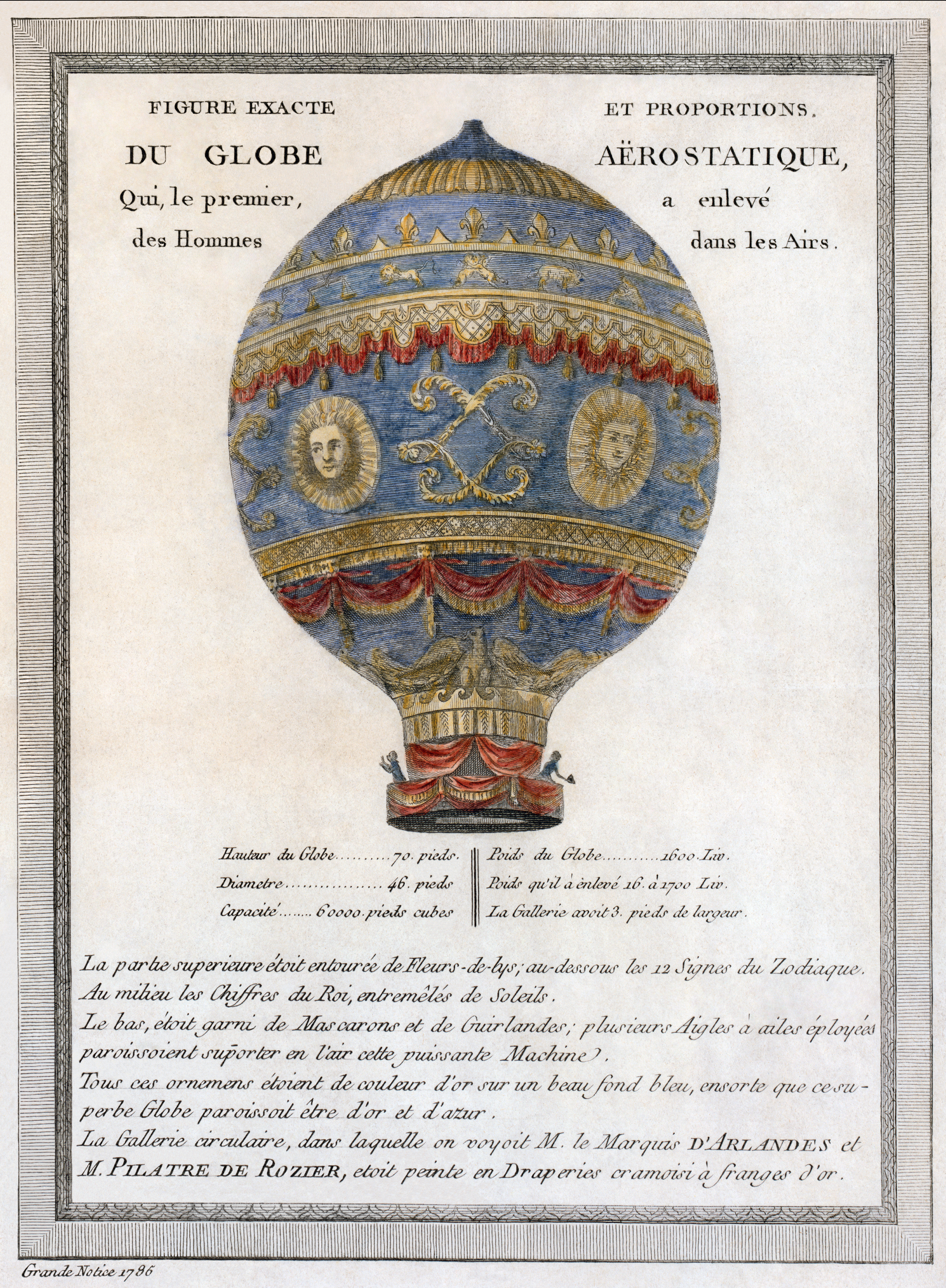
A 1786 depiction of the Montgolfier brothers' balloon

Early flying machines include all forms of aircraft studied or constructed before the development of the modern aeroplane by 1910. The story of modern flight begins more than a century before the first successful manned aeroplane, and the earliest aircraft thousands of years before.

== Primitive beginnings ==
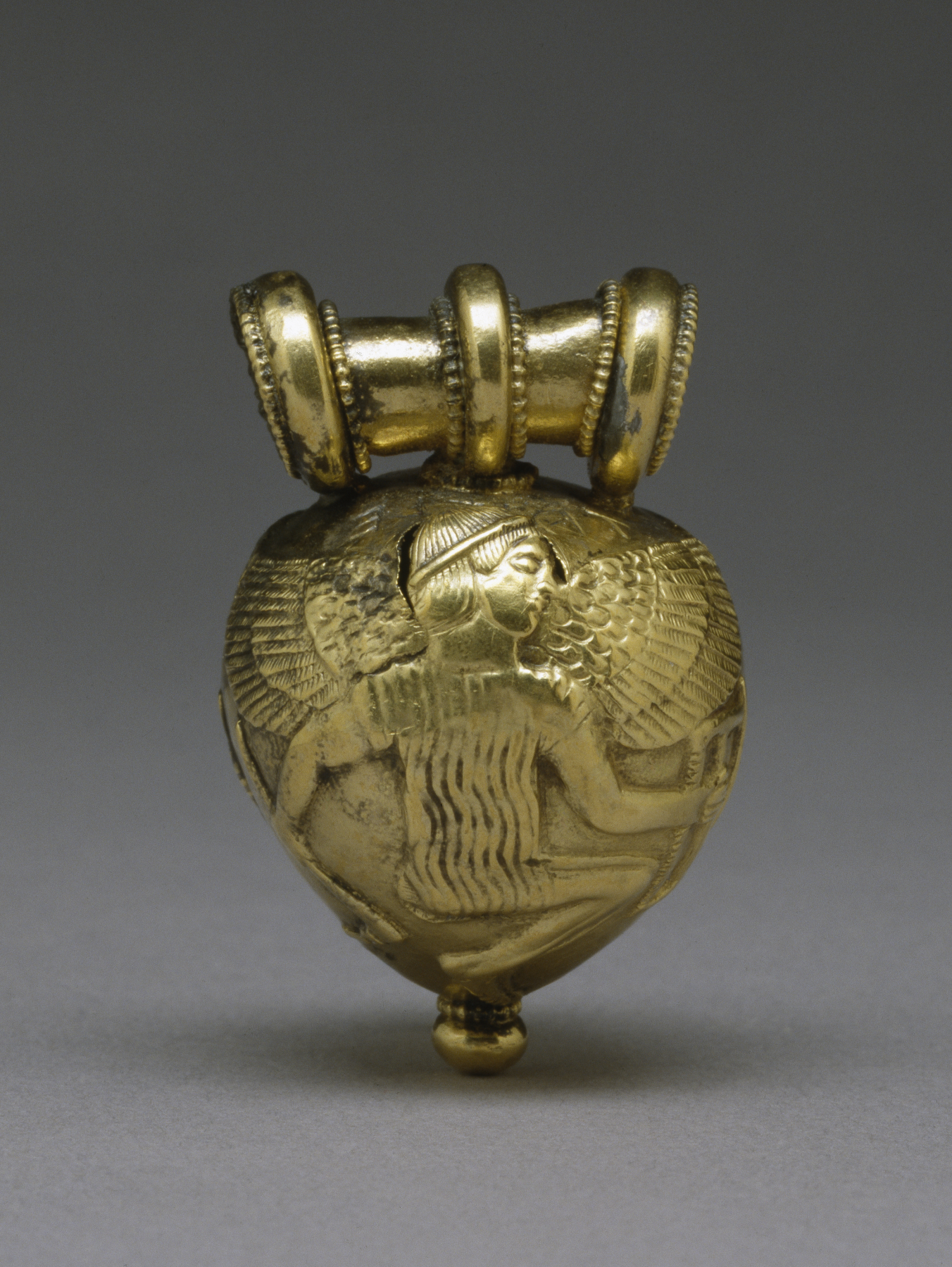
5th-century BC Etruscan bulla depicting Icarus

=== Legends ===
Some ancient mythologies feature legends of men using flying devices. One of the earliest known is the Greek legend of Daedalus; in Ovid's version, Daedalus fastens feathers together with thread and wax to mimic the wings of a bird. (Note: In The Outline of History, H. G. Wells says that "It is quite possible that Icarus was the first glider".) Other ancient legends include Hindu mythology's Vimana flying palace or chariot from the Puranas, the biblical Ezekiel's Chariot, the Irish roth rámach built by blind druid Mug Ruith and Simon Magus, various stories about magic carpets, and the mythical British King Bladud, who conjured up flying wings. The Flying Throne of Kay Kāvus was a legendary eagle-propelled craft built by the mythical Shah of Persia, Kay Kāvus, used for flying him all the way to China.

=== Early attempts ===
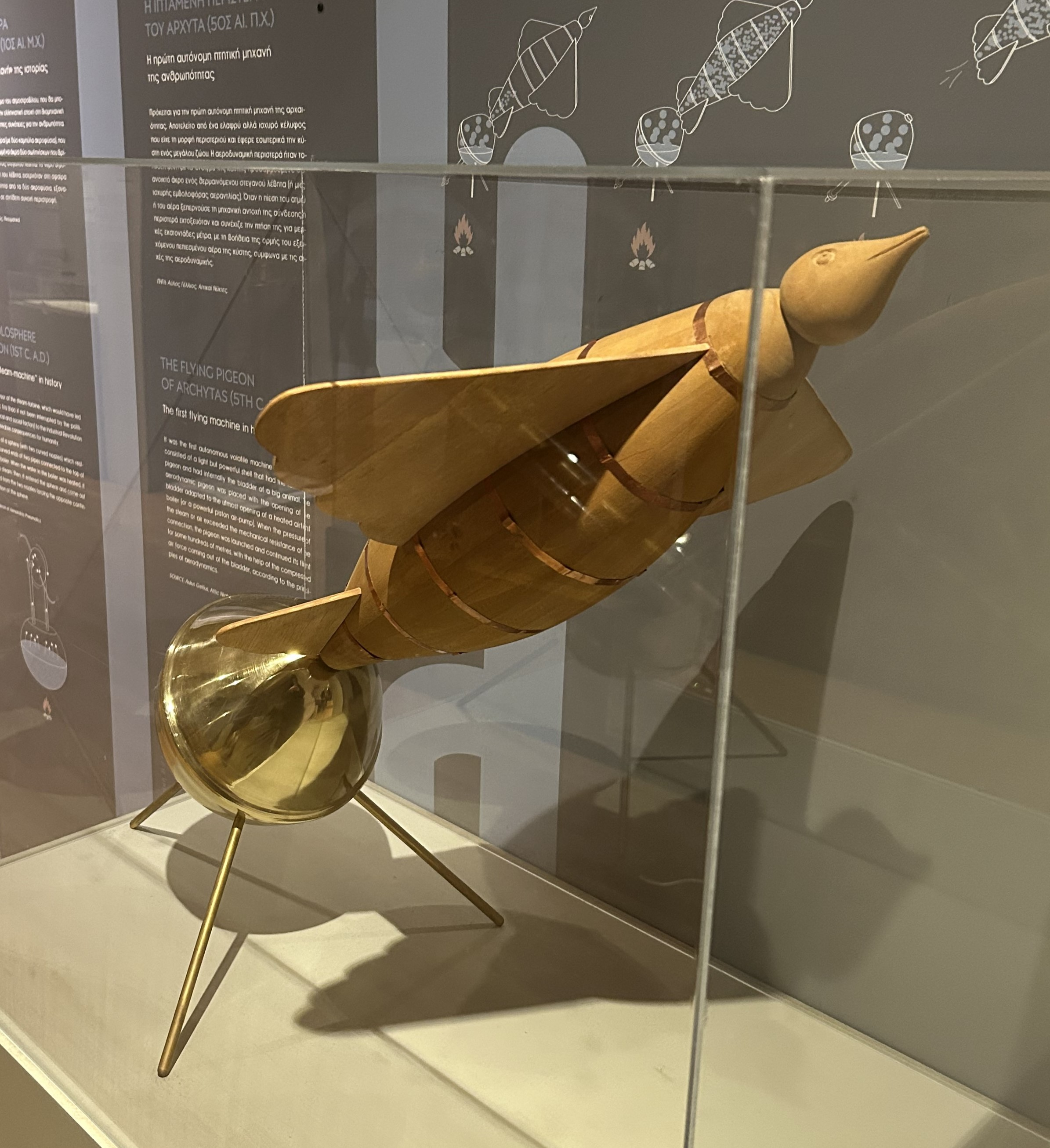
A reconstruction of Archytas' flying dove (5th c. B.C.), in Kotsanas Museum of Ancient Greek Technology, Athens, Greece.

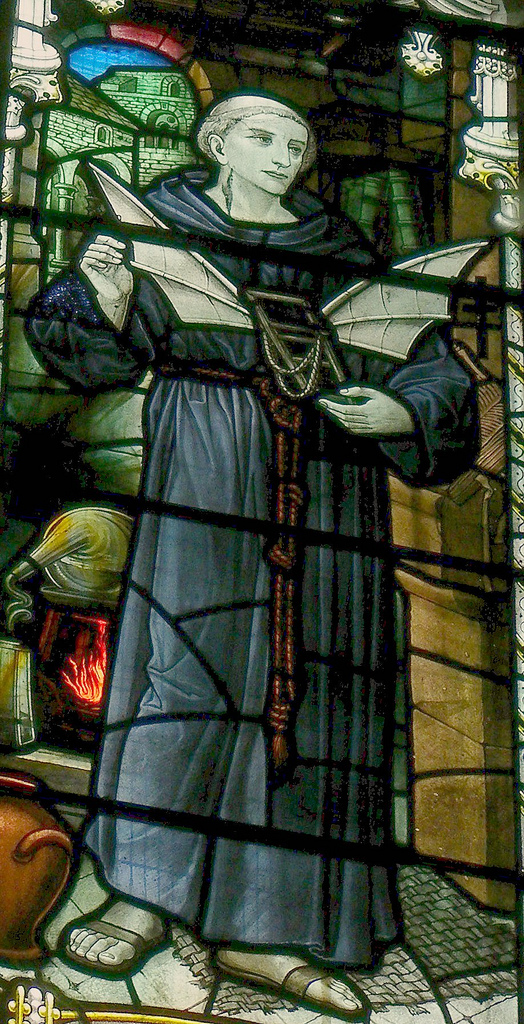
Stained glass depiction of Eilmer of Malmesbury

According to Aulus Gellius, the Ancient Greek philosopher, mathematician, astronomer, statesman, and strategist Archytas of Taranto (428–347 BC) was reputed to have designed and built the first artificial, self-propelled flying device, a bird-shaped model (called Archytas's flying dove) propelled by a jet of what was probably steam, said to have actually flown some 200 metres around 400 BC. According to Gellius, this machine, which its inventor called The Pigeon (Greek: Περιστέρα "Peristera"), was suspended on a wire or pivot for its "flight" and was powered by a "concealed aura or spirit".

Eventually some tried to build flying devices, such as birdlike wings, and to fly by jumping off a tower, hill, or cliff. During this early period physical issues of lift, stability, and control were not understood, and most attempts ended in serious injury or death. In the 1st century AD, Chinese Emperor Wang Mang recruited a specialist scout to be bound with bird feathers; he is claimed to have glided about 100 meters. In 559 AD, Yuan Huangtou is said to have landed safely from an enforced tower jump.

The Andalusian scientist Abbas ibn Firnas (810–887 AD) reportedly made a glide in Córdoba, Spain, covering his body with vulture feathers and attaching two wings to his arms. The flight attempt was reported by the 17th-century Algerian historian Ahmed Mohammed al-Maqqari, who linked it to a 9th-century poem by one of Muhammad I of Córdoba's court poets. Al-Maqqari stated that Firnas flew some distance, before landing with some injuries, attributed to his lacking a tail (as birds use to land). The historian Lynn Townsend White, Jr., concluded that ibn Firnas made the first successful flight in history. (Note: "Yet al-Maqqari cites a contemporary poem by Mu'min b. Said, a minor court poet of Cordoba under Muhammad I (d. 886 A.D.), which appears to refer to this flight and which has the greater evidential value because Mu'min did not like b. Firnas: he criticized one of his metaphors and disapproved his artificial thunder. ... Although the evidence is slender, we must conclude that b. Firnas was the first man to fly successfully, and that he has priority over Eilmer for this honor.")

In the twelfth century, William of Malmesbury stated that the 11th-century Benedictine monk Eilmer of Malmesbury attached wings to his hands and feet and flew a short distance, but broke both legs while landing, also having neglected to make himself a tail.

=== Early kites ===
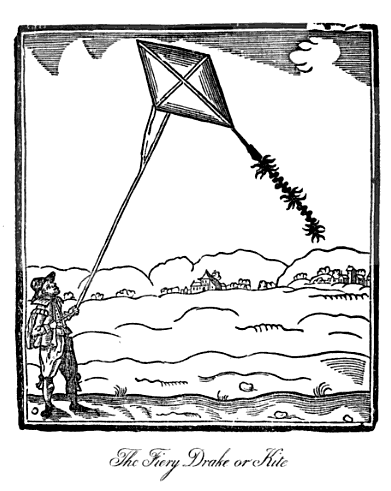
Woodcut print of a kite from John Bate's 1635 book, The Mysteryes of Nature and Art in which the kite is titled How to make fire Drakes

The kite was invented in China, possibly as far back as the 5th century BC by Mozi (also Mo Di) and Lu Ban (also Gongshu Ban). These leaf kites were constructed by stretching silk over a split bamboo framework. The earliest known Chinese kites were flat (not bowed) and often rectangular. Later, tailless kites incorporated a stabilizing bowline. Designs often emulated flying insects, birds, and other beasts, both real and mythical. Some were fitted with strings and whistles to make musical sounds while flying.

In 549 AD, a kite made of paper was used as a message for a rescue mission. Ancient and medieval Chinese sources list other uses of kites for measuring distances, testing the wind, lifting men, signalling, and communication for military operations.

After its introduction into India, the kite further evolved into the fighter kite. Traditionally these are small, unstable single line flat kites in which line tension alone is used for control, and an abrasive line is used to cut down other kites.

Kites also spread throughout Polynesia, as far as New Zealand. Anthropomorphic kites made from cloth and wood were used in religious ceremonies to send prayers to the gods. By 1634, kites had reached the West, with an illustration of a diamond kite with a tail appearing in Bate's Mysteries of nature and art.

==== Man-carrying kites ====
Man-carrying kites are believed to have been used extensively in ancient China, for both civil and military purposes and sometimes enforced as a punishment. Stories of man-carrying kites also occur in Japan, following the introduction of the kite from China around the seventh century AD. It is said that at one time there was a Japanese law against man-carrying kites.

In 1282, the European explorer Marco Polo described the Chinese techniques then current and commented on the hazards and cruelty involved. To foretell whether a ship should sail, a man would be strapped to a kite having a rectangular grid framework and the subsequent flight pattern used to divine the outlook.

=== Rotor wings ===
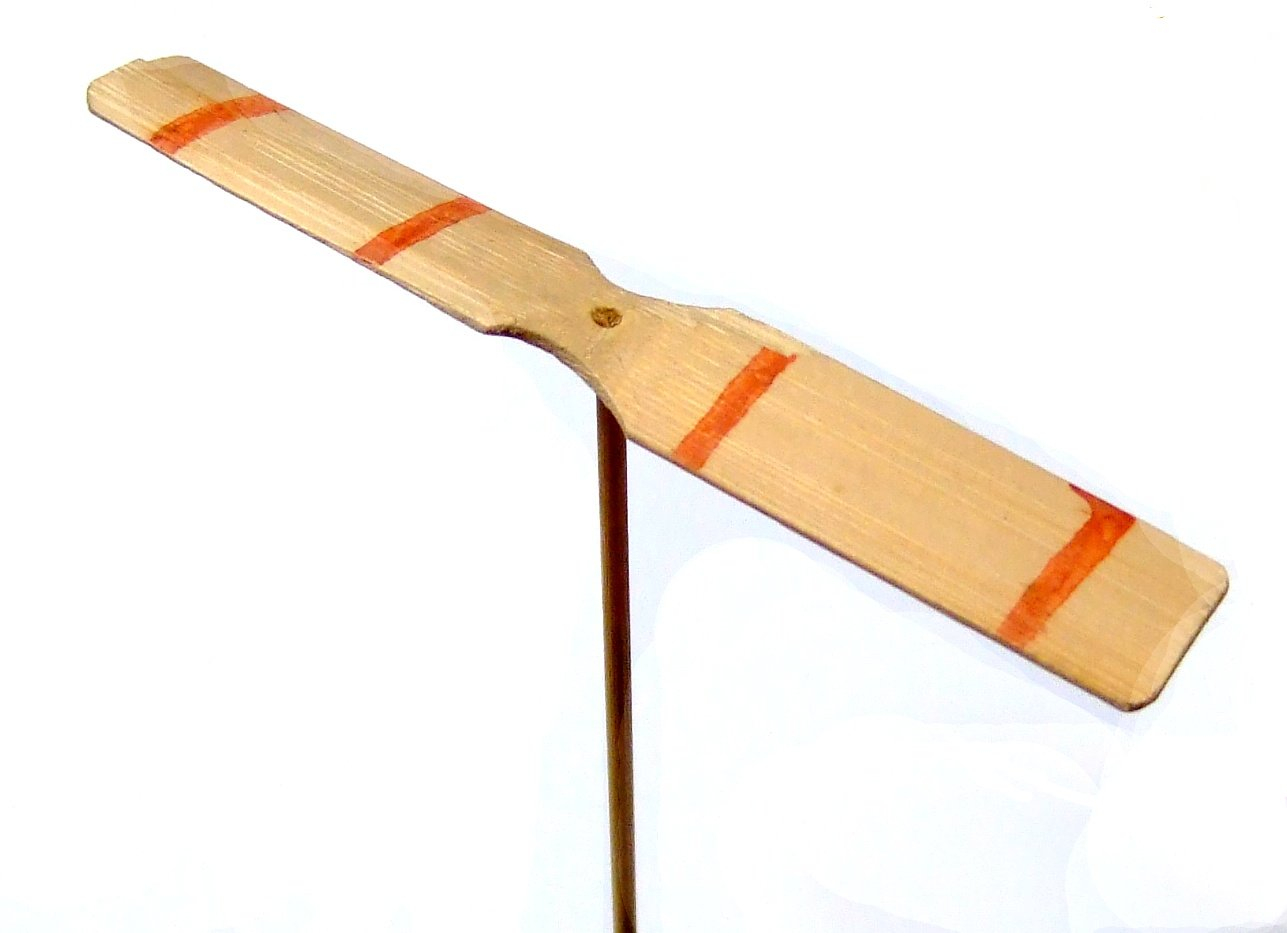
A decorated Japanese taketombo bamboo-copter

The use of a rotor for vertical flight has existed since the 4th century AD in the form of the bamboo-copter, an ancient Chinese toy. The bamboo-copter is spun by rolling a stick attached to a rotor. The spinning creates lift, and the toy flies when released. The philosopher Ge Hong's book, the Baopuzi (Master Who Embraces Simplicity), written around 317, describes the apocryphal use of a possible rotor in aircraft: "Some have made flying cars [feiche 飛車] with wood from the inner part of the jujube tree, using ox-leather (straps) fastened to returning blades so as to set the machine in motion."

The similar "moulinet à noix" (rotor on a nut), as well as string-pull toys with four blades, appeared in Europe in the 14th century.

=== Hot air balloons ===
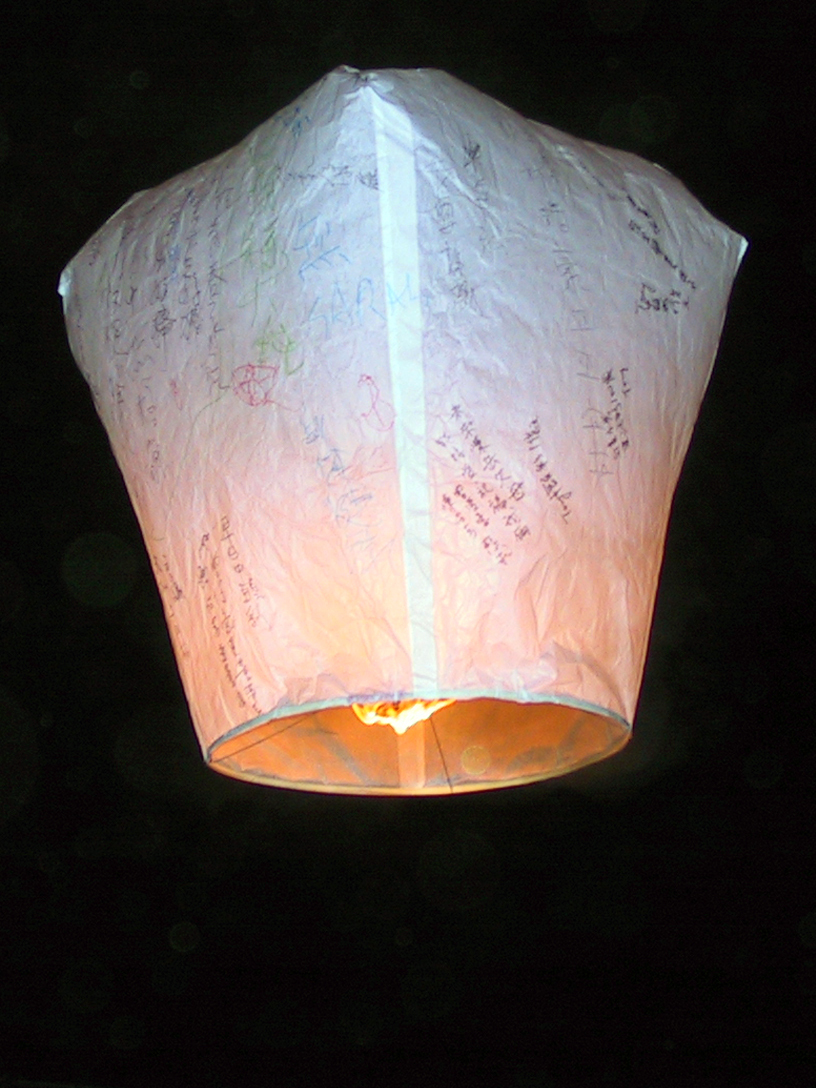
A sky lantern

From ancient times the Chinese have understood that hot air rises and have applied the principle to a type of small hot air balloon called a sky lantern. A sky lantern consists of a paper balloon under or just inside which a small lamp is placed. Sky lanterns are traditionally launched for pleasure and during festivals. According to Joseph Needham, such lanterns were known in China from the 3rd century BC. Their military use is attributed to the general Zhuge Liang, who is said to have used them to scare the enemy troops.

There is evidence the Chinese also "solved the problem of aerial navigation" using balloons, hundreds of years before the 18th century.

=== The Renaissance ===
Eventually some investigators began to discover and define some of the basics of scientific aircraft design. Powered designs were either still driven by man-power or used a metal spring. In his 1250 book De mirabili potestate artis et naturae (Secrets of Art and Nature), the Englishman Roger Bacon predicted future designs for a balloon filled with an unspecified aether as well as a man-powered ornithopter, claiming to know someone who had invented the latter.

==== Leonardo da Vinci ====
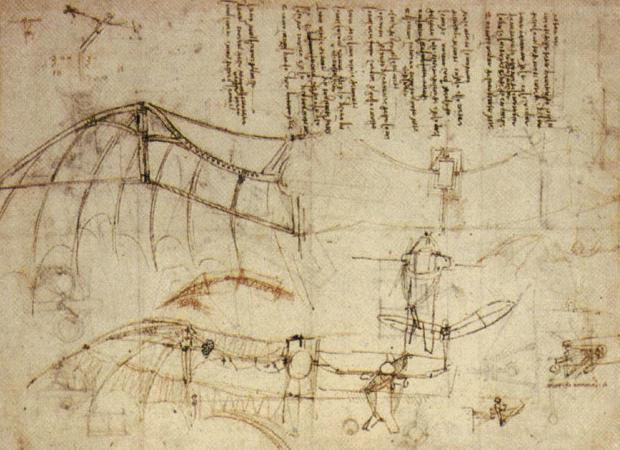
Leonardo da Vinci's ornithopter wings

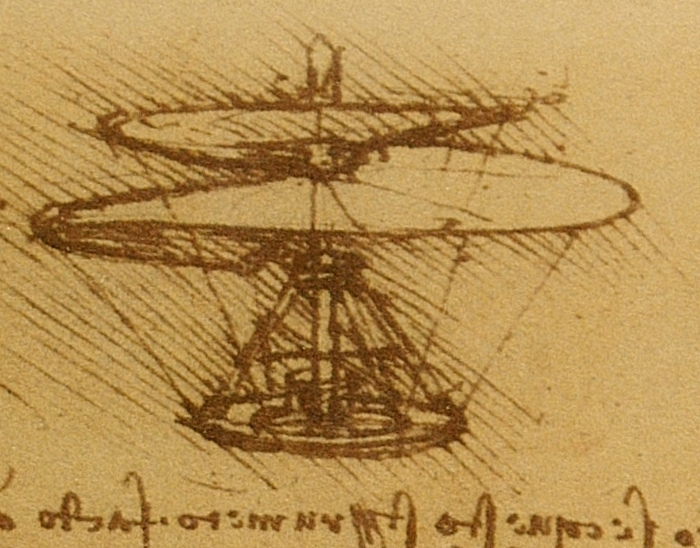
Leonardo's "aerial screw" design.

Leonardo da Vinci studied bird flight for many years, analyzing it rationally and anticipating many principles of aerodynamics. He understood that "An object offers as much resistance to the air as the air does to the object", anticipating Isaac Newton's third law of motion (published in 1687). From the last years of the 15th century onwards, Leonardo wrote about and sketched many designs for flying machines and mechanisms, including ornithopters, fixed-wing gliders, rotorcraft and parachutes. His early designs were man-powered types including rotorcraft and ornithopters (improving on Bacon's proposal by adding a stabilizing tail). He eventually came to realise the impracticality of these and turned to controlled gliding flight, also sketching some designs powered by a spring.

In 1488, Leonardo drew a hang glider design in which the inner parts of the wings are fixed, and some control surfaces are provided towards the tips (as in the gliding flight of birds). His drawings survive and are deemed flight-worthy in principle, but he himself never flew in such a craft. In an essay titled Sul volo (On flight), he describes a flying machine called "the bird" which he built from starched linen, leather joints, and raw silk thongs. In the Codex Atlanticus, he wrote, "Tomorrow morning, on the second day of January, 1496, I will make the thong and the attempt." Some of Leonardo's other designs, such as the four-person aerial screw, similar to a helicopter, have severe flaws. He drew and wrote about a design for an ornithopter around 1490. Leonardo's work remained unknown until 1797, and so had no influence on developments over the next three hundred years.

=== Other attempts ===
In 1496, a man named Seccio broke both arms in Nuremberg while attempting flight. In 1507, John Damian strapped on wings covered with chicken feathers and jumped from the walls of Stirling Castle in Scotland, breaking his thigh; he later blamed it on not using eagle feathers.

The earliest report of an attempted jet flight dates back to the Ottoman Empire. In 1633, the aviator Lagâri Hasan Çelebi reportedly used a cone-shaped rocket to make the first attempt at a jet flight.

Francis Willughby's suggestion, published in 1676, that human legs were more comparable to birds' wings in strength than arms, had occasional influence. On 15 May 1793, the Spanish inventor Diego Marín Aguilera jumped with his glider from the highest part of the castle of Coruña del Conde, reaching a height of about 5 or 6 m, and gliding for about 360 metres. As late as 1811, Albrecht Berblinger constructed an ornithopter and jumped into the Danube at Ulm.

== Lighter than air ==
=== Balloons ===
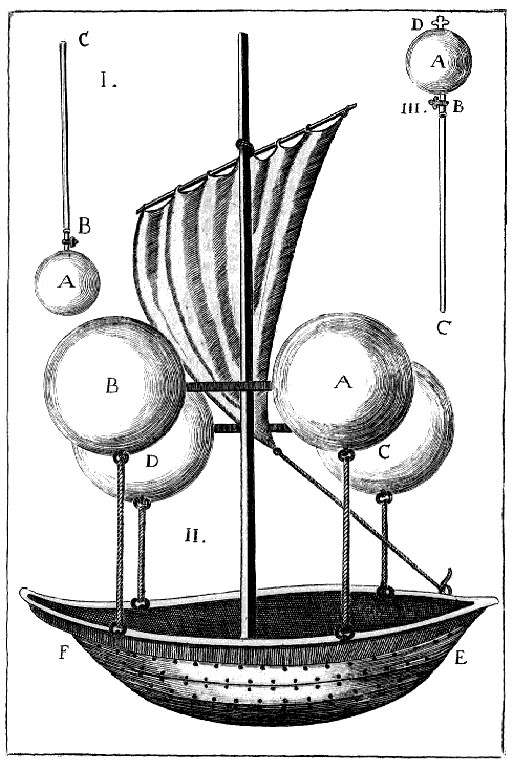
Francesco Lana de Terzi's flying boat concept c.1670

The modern era of lighter-than-air flight began early in the 17th century with Galileo Galilei's experiments in which he showed that air has weight. Around 1650, Cyrano de Bergerac wrote some fantasy novels in which he described the principle of ascent using a substance (dew) he supposed to be lighter than air, and descending by releasing a controlled amount of the substance. Francesco Lana de Terzi measured the pressure of air at sea level and in 1670 proposed the first scientifically credible lifting medium in the form of hollow metal spheres from which all the air had been pumped out. These would be lighter than the displaced air and able to lift an airship. His proposed methods of controlling height are still in use today: carrying ballast which may be dropped overboard to gain height, and venting the lifting containers to lose height. In practice de Terzi's spheres would have collapsed under air pressure, and further developments had to wait for more practicable lifting gases.

The first documented balloon flight in Europe was of a model made by the Brazilian-born Portuguese priest Bartolomeu de Gusmão. On 8 August 1709, in Lisbon, he made a small hot-air balloon of paper with a fire burning beneath it, lifting it about 4 metres (13 ft) in front of king John V and the Portuguese court.

In the mid-18th century the Montgolfier brothers began experimenting with parachutes and balloons in France. Their balloons were made of paper, and early experiments using steam as the lifting gas were short-lived due to its effect on the paper as it condensed. Mistaking smoke for a kind of steam, they began filling their balloons with hot smoky air which they called "electric smoke". Despite not fully understanding the principles at work, they made some successful launches and in December 1782 flew a 20 m^{3} (710 ft^{3}) balloon to a height of 300 m (980 ft). The French Académie des Sciences soon invited them to Paris to give a demonstration.

Meanwhile, the discovery of hydrogen led Joseph Black to propose its use as a lifting gas in about 1780, though practical demonstration awaited a gastight balloon material. On hearing of the Montgolfier Brothers' invitation, the French Academy member Jacques Charles offered a similar demonstration of a hydrogen balloon and this was accepted. Charles and two craftsmen, the Robert brothers, developed a gastight material of rubberised silk and set to work.

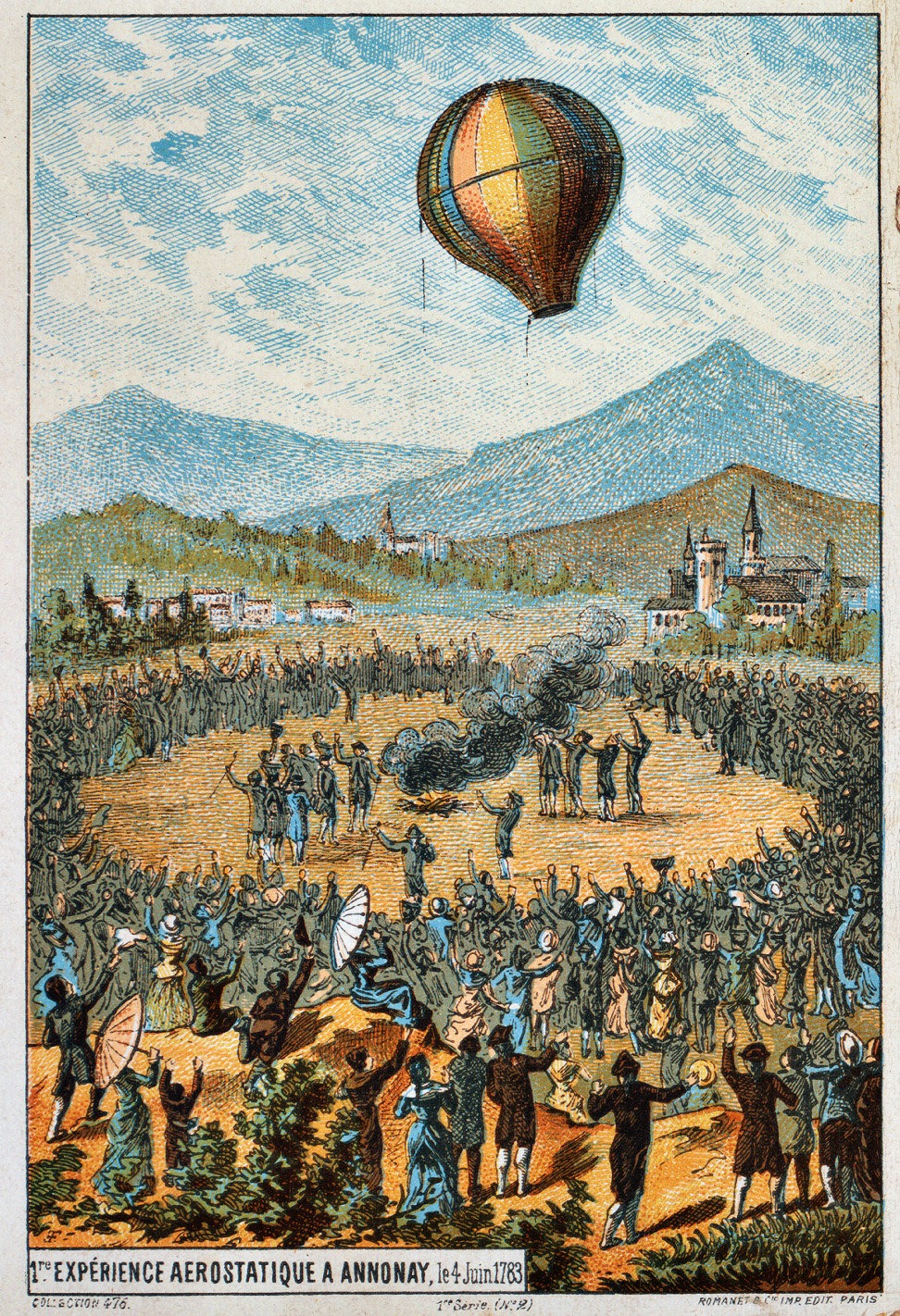
First public hot air balloon demonstration by the Montgolfier brothers, 4 June 1783

1783 was a watershed year for ballooning. Between 4 June and 1 December five separate French balloons achieved important aviation firsts:

- 4 June: The Montgolfier brothers' unmanned hot air balloon lifted a sheep, a duck and a chicken in a basket hanging beneath at Annonay.
- 27 August: Professor Jacques Charles and the Robert brothers flew an unmanned hydrogen balloon. The hydrogen gas was generated by chemical reaction during the filling process.
- 19 October: The Montgolfiers launched the first manned flight, a tethered balloon with humans on board, at the Folie Titon in Paris. The aviators were the scientist Jean-François Pilâtre de Rozier, the manufacture manager Jean-Baptiste Réveillon, and Giroud de Villette.
- 21 November: The Montgolfiers launched the first free flight balloon with human passengers. King Louis XVI had originally decreed that condemned criminals would be the first pilots, but Rozier, along with the Marquis François d'Arlandes, successfully petitioned for the honor. They drifted 8 km (5.0 mi) in a balloon powered by a wood fire. 9 kilometres (5.6 mi) covered in 25 minutes.
- 1 December: Jacques Charles and Nicolas-Louis Robert launched a manned hydrogen balloon from the Jardin des Tuileries in Paris. They ascended to a height of about 1,800 feet (550 m) and landed at sunset in Nesles-la-Vallée after a flight of 2 hours and 5 minutes, covering 22 miles (35 km). After Robert alighted Charles decided to ascend alone. This time he ascended rapidly to an altitude of about 3,000 metres (9,800 ft), where he saw the sun again but also suffered extreme pain in his ears.

The Montgolfier designs had several shortcomings, not least the need for dry weather and a tendency for sparks from the fire to set light to the paper balloon. The manned design had a gallery around the base of the balloon rather than the hanging basket of the first, unmanned design, which brought the paper closer to the fire. On their free flight, De Rozier and d'Arlandes took buckets of water and sponges to douse these fires as they arose. On the other hand, the manned design of Charles was essentially modern. As a result of these exploits, the hot air balloon became known as the Montgolfière type and the gas balloon the Charlière.

The next balloon of Charles and the Robert brothers was a Charlière that followed Jean Baptiste Meusnier's proposals for an elongated dirigible balloon, and was notable for having an outer envelope with the gas contained in a second, inner ballonet. On 19 September 1784, it completed the first flight of over 100 kilometres (62 mi), between Paris and Beuvry, despite the man-powered propulsive devices proving useless.

In January the next year Jean Pierre Blanchard and John Jeffries crossed the English Channel from Dover to the Bois de Felmores in a Charlière. But a similar attempt the other way ended in tragedy. To try to provide both endurance and controllability, de Rozier developed a balloon with both hot air and hydrogen gas bags, a design which was soon named after him as the Rozière. His idea was to use the hydrogen section for constant lift and to navigate vertically by heating and allowing to cool the hot air section, in order to catch the most favourable wind at whatever altitude it was blowing. The balloon envelope was made of goldbeaters skin. Shortly after the flight began, de Rozier was seen to be venting hydrogen when it was ignited by a spark and the balloon went up in flames, killing those on board. The source of the spark is not known, but suggestions include static electricity or the brazier for the hot air section.

Ballooning quickly became a major "rage" in Europe in the late 18th century, providing the first detailed understanding of the relationship between altitude and the atmosphere. By the early 1900s, ballooning was a popular sport in Britain. These privately owned balloons usually used coal gas as the lifting gas. This has about half the lifting power of hydrogen, so the balloons had to be larger; however, coal gas was far more readily available, and the local gas works sometimes provided a special lightweight formula for ballooning events.

Tethered balloons were used during the American Civil War by the Union Army Balloon Corps. In 1863, the young Ferdinand von Zeppelin, who was acting as a military observer with the Union Army of the Potomac, first flew as a balloon passenger in a balloon that had been in service with the Union army. Later that century, the British Army would make use of observation balloons during the Boer War.

=== Dirigibles or airships ===
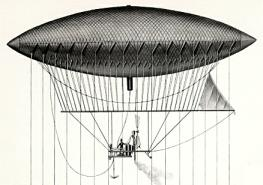
The dirigible balloon created by Giffard in 1852

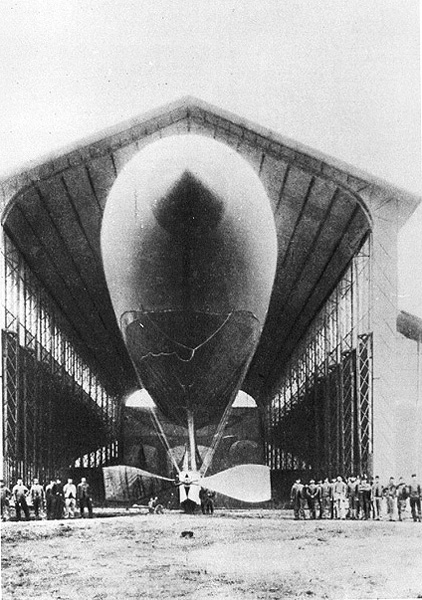
The 1884 La France, the first fully controllable airship

Work on developing a dirigible (steerable) balloon, today called an airship, continued sporadically throughout the 19th century. The first sustained powered, controlled flight in history is believed to have taken place on 24 September 1852 when Henri Giffard flew about 17 miles (27 km) in France from Paris to Trappes with the Giffard dirigible, a non-rigid airship filled with hydrogen and powered by a 3 horsepower (2.2 kW) steam engine driving a 3-bladed propeller.

In 1863, Solomon Andrews flew his aereon design, an unpowered, controllable dirigible in Perth Amboy, New Jersey. He flew a later design in 1866 around New York City and as far as Oyster Bay, New York. His technique of gliding under gravity works by changing the lift to provide propulsive force as the airship alternately rises and sinks, and so does not need a powerplant.

A further advance was made on 9 August 1884, when the first fully controllable free flight was made by Charles Renard and Arthur Constantin Krebs in a French Army electric-powered airship, La France. The 170-foot (52 m) long, 66,000-cubic-foot (1,900 m^{3}) airship covered 8 km (5 mi) in 23 minutes with the aid of an 8.5 horsepower (6.3 kW) electric motor, returning to its starting point. This was the first flight over a closed circuit.

These aircraft were not practical. Besides being generally frail and short-lived, they were non-rigid or at best semi-rigid. Consequently, it was difficult to make them large enough to carry a commercial load.

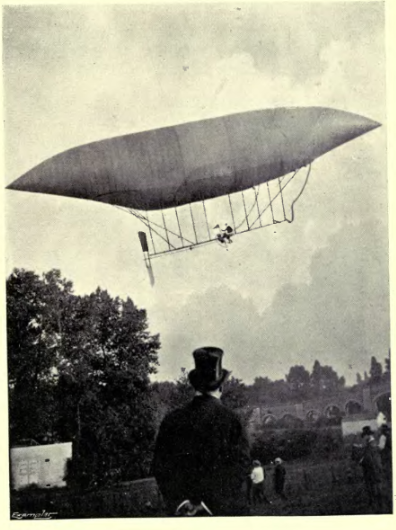
Langley watches the flight of Santos-Dumont No. 4

Count Ferdinand von Zeppelin realised that a rigid outer frame would allow a much bigger airship. He founded the Zeppelin firm, whose rigid Luftschiff Zeppelin 1 (LZ 1) first flew from the Bodensee on the Swiss border on 2 July 1900. The flight lasted 18 minutes. The second and third flights, in October 1900 and on 24 October 1900 respectively, beat the 6 m/s (13 mph) speed record of the French airship La France by 3 m/s (7 mph).

The Brazilian Alberto Santos-Dumont became famous by designing, building, and flying dirigibles. He built and flew the first fully practical dirigible capable of routine, controlled flight. With his dirigible No.6 he won the Deutsch de la Meurthe prize on 19 October 1901 with a flight that took off from Saint-Cloud, rounded the Eiffel Tower and returned to its starting point. By this point, the airship had been established as the first practicable form of air travel.

== Heavier than air ==
=== Parachutes ===
Leonardo da Vinci's design for a pyramid-shaped parachute remained unpublished for centuries. The first published design was the Croatian Fausto Veranzio's homo volans (flying man) which appeared in his book Machinae novae (New machines) in 1595. Based on a ship's sail, it comprised a square of material stretched across a square frame and retained by ropes. The parachutist was suspended by ropes from each of the four corners.

Louis-Sébastien Lenormand is considered the first human to make a witnessed descent with a parachute. On 26 December 1783, he jumped from the tower of the Montpellier observatory in France, in front of a crowd that included Joseph Montgolfier, using a 14 feet (4.3 m) parachute with a rigid wooden frame.

Between 1853 and 1854, Louis Charles Letur developed a parachute-glider comprising an umbrella-like parachute with smaller, triangular wings and vertical tail beneath. Letur died after it crashed in 1854. (Note: The glider was still attached to a balloon and was accidentally dragged over trees, Letur died a few days later.)

=== Kites ===
Kites are most notable in the recent history of aviation primarily for their man-carrying or man-lifting capabilities, although they have also been important in other areas such as meteorology.

The Frenchman Gaston Biot developed a man-lifting kite in 1868. Later, in 1880, Biot demonstrated to the French Society for Aerial Navigation a kite based on an open-ended cone, similar to a windsock but attached to a flat surface. The man-carrying kite was developed a stage further in 1894 by Captain Baden Baden-Powell, brother of Lord Baden-Powell, who strung a chain of hexagonal kites on a single line. A significant development came in 1893 when the Australian Lawrence Hargrave invented the box kite and some man-carrying experiments were carried out both in Australia and in the United States. On 27 December 1905, Neil MacDearmid was carried aloft in Baddeck, Nova Scotia, Canada by a large box kite named the Frost King, designed by Alexander Graham Bell.

Balloons were by then in use for both meteorology and military observation. Balloons can only be used in light winds, while kites can only be used in stronger winds. The American Samuel Franklin Cody, working in England, realised that the two types of craft between them allowed operation over a wide range of weather conditions. He developed Hargrave's basic design, adding additional lifting surfaces to create powerful man-lifting systems using multiple kites on a single line. Cody made many demonstrations of his system and would later sell four of his "war kite" systems to the Royal Navy. His kites also found use in carrying meteorological instruments aloft and he was made a fellow of the Royal Meteorological Society. In 1905, Sapper Moreton of the British Army's balloon section was lifted 2,600 feet (790 m) by a kite at Aldershot under Cody's supervision. In 1906, Cody was appointed Chief Instructor in Kiting at the Army School of Ballooning in Aldershot. He soon also joined the newly established Army Balloon Factory at Farnborough and continued developing his war kites for the British Army. In his own time, he developed a manned "glider-kite" which was launched on a tether like a kite and then released to glide freely. In 1907, Cody next fitted an aircraft engine to a modified unmanned "power-kite", the precursor to his later aeroplanes, and flew it inside the Balloon Shed, along a wire suspended from poles, before the Prince and Princess of Wales. The British Army officially adopted his war kites for their Balloon Companies in 1908.

=== 17th and 18th centuries ===
Da Vinci's realisation that manpower alone was not sufficient for sustained flight was rediscovered independently in the 17th century by Giovanni Alfonso Borelli and Robert Hooke. Hooke realised that some form of engine would be necessary and in 1655 made a spring-powered ornithopter model which was apparently able to fly.

Attempts to design or construct a true flying machine began, typically comprising a gondola with a supporting canopy and spring- or man-powered flappers for propulsion. Among the first were Hautsch and Burattini (1648). Others included de Gusmão's "Passarola" (1709 on), Swedenborg (1716), Desforges (1772), Bauer (1764), Meerwein (1781), and Blanchard (1781) who would later have more success with balloons. Rotary-winged helicopters likewise appeared, notably from Lomonosov (1754) and Paucton. A few model gliders flew successfully although some claims are contested, but in any event no full-size craft succeeded.

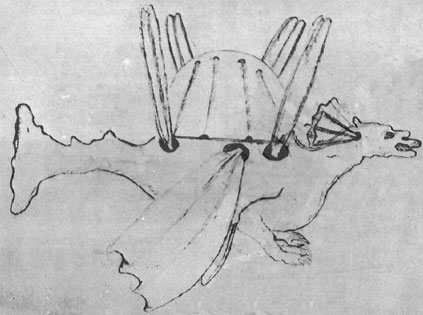
Burattini's Dragon Volant (lit. "Flying Dragon").

Italian inventor Tito Livio Burattini, invited by the Polish King Władysław IV to his court in Warsaw, built a model aircraft with four fixed glider wings in 1647. Described as "four pairs of wings attached to an elaborate 'dragon'", it was said to have successfully lifted a cat in 1648 but not Burattini himself. He promised that "only the most minor injuries" would result from landing the craft. His "Dragon Volant" is considered "the most elaborate and sophisticated aeroplane to be built before the 19th Century".

Bartolomeu de Gusmão's "Passarola" was a hollow, vaguely bird-shaped glider of similar concept but with two wings. In 1709, he presented a petition to King John V of Portugal, begging for support for his invention of an "airship", in which he expressed the greatest confidence. The public test of the machine, which was set for 24 June 1709, did not take place. According to contemporary reports, however, Gusmão appears to have made several less ambitious experiments with this machine, descending from eminences. It is certain that Gusmão was working on this principle at the public exhibition he gave before the Court on 8 August 1709, in the hall of the Casa da Índia in Lisbon, when he propelled a ball to the roof by combustion. He also demonstrated a small airship model before the Portuguese court, but never succeeded with a full-scale model.

Both understanding and a power source were still lacking. This was recognised by Emanuel Swedenborg in his "Sketch of a Machine for Flying in the Air" (1716). His flying machine consisted of a light frame covered with strong canvas and provided with two large oars or wings moving on a horizontal axis, arranged so that the upstroke met with no resistance while the downstroke provided lifting power. Swedenborg knew that the machine would not fly, but suggested it as a start and was confident that the problem would be solved. He wrote: "It seems easier to talk of such a machine than to put it into actuality, for it requires greater force and less weight than exists in a human body. The science of mechanics might perhaps suggest a means, namely, a strong spiral spring. If these advantages and requisites are observed, perhaps in time to come some one might know how better to utilize our sketch and cause some addition to be made so as to accomplish that which we can only suggest". The Editor of the Royal Aeronautical Society journal wrote in 1910 that Swedenborg's design was "...the first rational proposal for a flying machine of the aeroplance [heavier-than-air] type..."

Meanwhile, rotorcraft were not wholly forgotten. In July 1754, Mikhail Lomonosov demonstrated a small coaxial twin-rotor system, powered by a spring, to the Russian Academy of Sciences. The rotors were arranged one above the other and spun in opposite directions, principles still used in modern twin-rotor designs. In his 1768 Théorie de la vis d'Archimède, Alexis-Jean-Pierre Paucton suggested the use of one airscrew for lift and a second for propulsion, nowadays called a gyrodyne. In 1784, Launoy and Bienvenu demonstrated a flying model with coaxial, contra-rotating rotors powered by a simple spring similar to a bow saw, now accepted as the first powered helicopter.

Attempts at man-powered flight still persisted. Paucton's rotorcraft was man-powered, while another approach, also originally studied by Leonardo, was the use of flap valves. The flap valve is a simple hinged flap over a hole in the wing. In one direction it opens to allow air through and in the other it closes to allow an increased pressure difference. An early example was designed by Bauer in 1764. Later in 1808, Jacob Degen built an ornithopter with flap valves, in which the pilot stood on a rigid frame and worked the wings with a movable horizontal bar. His 1809 attempt at flight failed, so he then added a small hydrogen balloon and the combination achieved some short hops. Popular illustrations of the day depicted his machine without the balloon, leading to confusion as to what had actually flown. In 1811, Albrecht Berblinger built an ornithopter based on Degen's design but omitted the balloon, plunging instead into the Danube. The fiasco did have an upside: George Cayley, also taken in by the illustrations, was spurred to publish his findings to date "for the sake of giving a little more dignity to a subject bordering upon the ludicrous in public estimation", and the modern era of aviation was born.

=== 19th century ===
Throughout the 19th century, tower jumping was replaced in popularity by the equally-fatal balloon jumping as a way to demonstrate the continued uselessness of man-power and flapping wings. Meanwhile, the scientific study of heavier-than-air flight began in earnest.

==== Sir George Cayley and the first modern aircraft ====
Sir George Cayley was first called the "father of the aeroplane" in 1846. During the last years of the previous century he had begun the first rigorous study of the physics of flight and would later design the first modern heavier-than-air craft. Among his many achievements, his most important contributions to aeronautics include:

- Clarifying our ideas and laying down the principles of heavier-than-air flight.
- Reaching a scientific understanding of the principles of bird flight.
- Conducting scientific aerodynamic experiments demonstrating drag and streamlining, movement of the centre of pressure, and the increase in lift from curving the wing surface.
- Defining the modern aeroplane configuration comprising a fixed-wing, fuselage and tail assembly.
- Demonstrations of manned, gliding flight.
- Setting out the principles of power-to-weight ratio in sustaining flight.

From the age of ten, Cayley began studying the physics of bird flight and his school notebooks contained sketches in which he was developing his ideas on the theories of flight. It has been claimed that these sketches show that Cayley modeled the principles of a lift-generating inclined plane as early as 1792 or 1793.

In 1796, Cayley made a model helicopter of the form commonly known as a Chinese flying top, unaware of Launoy and Bienvenu's model of similar design. He regarded the helicopter as the best design for simple vertical flight, and later in his life in 1854 he made an improved model. He gave a Mr. Cooper credit for being the first person to improve on "the clumsy structure of the toy" and reports Cooper's model as ascending twenty or thirty feet. Cayley made one and a Mr. Coulson made a copy, described by Cayley as "a very beautiful specimen of the screw propeller in the air" and capable of flying over ninety feet high.

Cayley's next innovations were twofold: the adoption of the whirling arm test rig, invented in the previous century by Benjamin Robbins to investigate aerodynamic drag and used soon after by John Smeaton to measure the forces on rotating windmill blades, for use in aircraft research together with the use of aerodynamic models on the arm, rather than attempting to fly a model of a complete design. He initially used a simple flat plane fixed to the arm and inclined at an angle to the airflow.

In 1799, he set down the concept of the modern aeroplane as a fixed-wing flying machine with separate systems for lift, propulsion, and control. On a small silver disc dated that year, he engraved on one side the forces acting on an aircraft and on the other a sketch of an aircraft design incorporating such modern features as a cambered wing, separate tail comprising a horizontal tailplane and vertical fin, and fuselage for the pilot suspended below the center of gravity to provide stability. The design is not yet wholly modern, incorporating as it does two pilot-operated paddles or oars which appear to work as flap valves.

He continued his research, and in 1804 constructed a model glider which was the first modern heavier-than-air flying machine, having the layout of a conventional modern aircraft with an inclined wing towards the front and adjustable tail at the back with both tailplane and fin. The wing was just a toy paper kite, flat, and uncambered. A movable weight allowed adjustment of the model's center of gravity. It was "very pretty to see" when flying down a hillside, and sensitive to small adjustments of the tail.

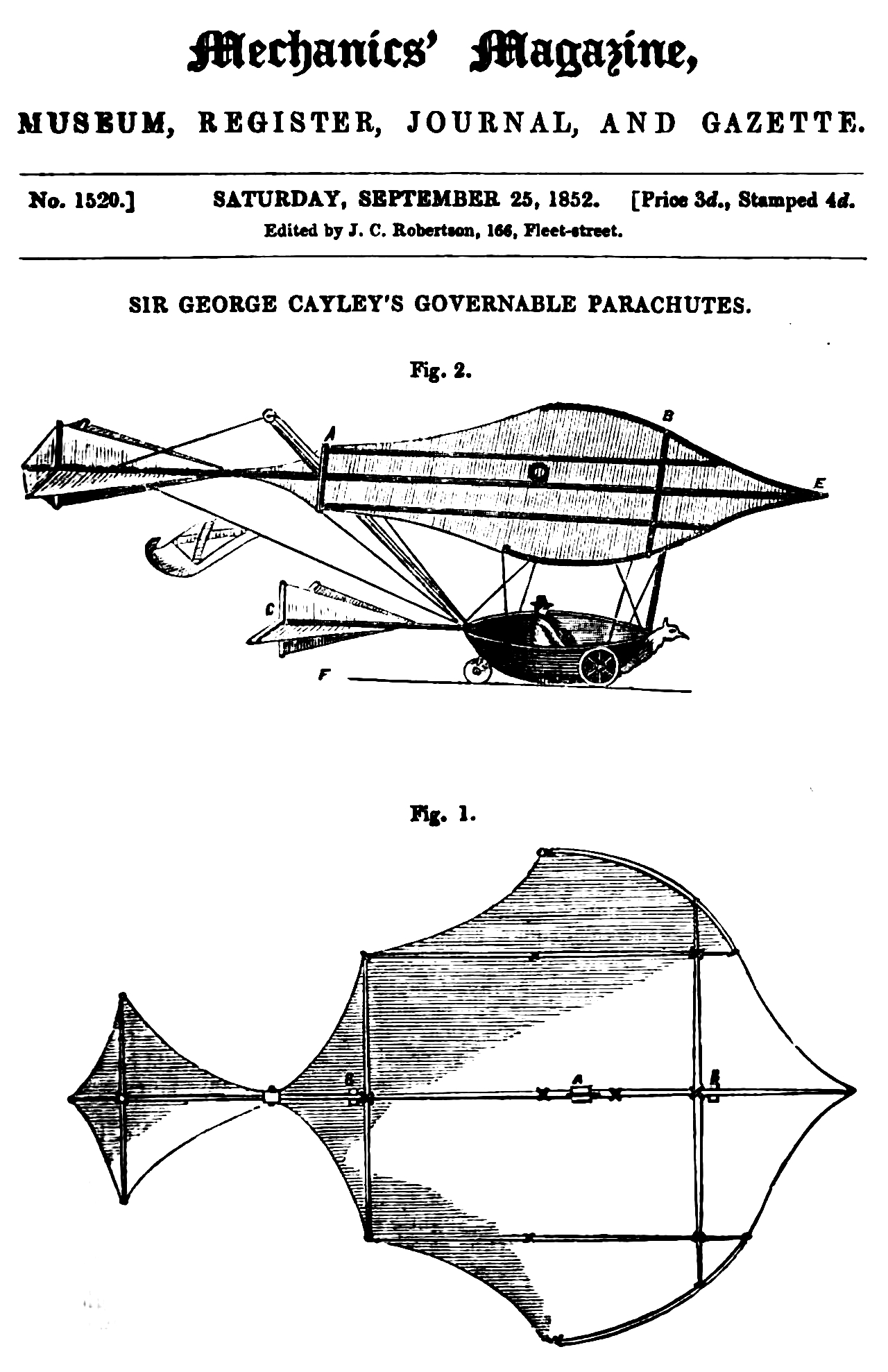
"Governable parachute" design of 1852

By the end of 1809, he had constructed the world's first full-size glider and flown it as an unmanned tethered kite. In the same year, goaded by the farcical antics of his contemporaries (see above), he began the publication of a landmark three-part treatise titled "On Aerial Navigation" (1809–1810). In it he wrote the first scientific statement of the problem, "The whole problem is confined within these limits, viz. to make a surface support a given weight by the application of power to the resistance of air". He identified the four vector forces that influence an aircraft: thrust, lift, drag and weight and distinguished stability and control in his designs. He argued that manpower alone was insufficient, and while no suitable power source was yet available he discussed the possibilities and even described the operating principle of the internal combustion engine using a gas and air mixture. However he was never able to make a working engine and confined his flying experiments to gliding flight. He also identified and described the importance of the cambered aerofoil, dihedral, diagonal bracing and drag reduction, and contributed to the understanding and design of ornithopters and parachutes.

In 1848, he had progressed far enough to construct a glider in the form of a triplane large and safe enough to carry a child. A local boy was chosen but his name is not known.

He went on to publish the design for a full-size manned glider or "governable parachute" to be launched from a balloon in 1852 and then to construct a version capable of launching from the top of a hill, which carried the first adult aviator across Brompton Dale in 1853. The identity of the aviator is not known. It has been suggested variously as Cayley's coachman, footman or butler, John Appleby who may have been the coachman or another employee, or even Cayley's grandson George John Cayley. What is known is that he was the first to fly in a glider with distinct wings, fuselage and tail, and featuring inherent stability and pilot-operated controls: the first fully modern and functional heavier-than-air craft.

Minor inventions included the rubber-powered motor, which provided a reliable power source for research models. By 1808, he had even re-invented the wheel, devising the tension-spoked wheel in which all compression loads are carried by the rim, allowing a lightweight undercarriage.

==== The age of steam ====
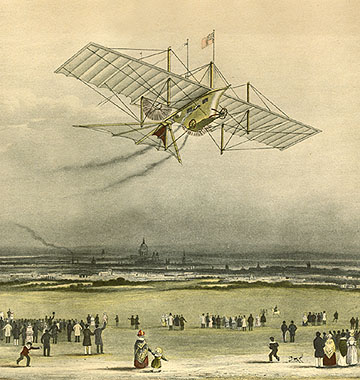
1843 engraving of the Aerial Steam Carriage

Drawing directly from Cayley's work, William Samuel Henson's 1842 design for an aerial steam carriage broke new ground. Henson proposed a 150 feet (46 m) span high-winged monoplane, with a steam engine driving two pusher configuration propellers. Although only a design, (scale models were built in 1843 or 1848 and flew 3 or 40 metres (10 or 130 ft)) it was the first in history for a propeller-driven fixed-wing aircraft. Henson and his collaborator John Stringfellow even dreamed of the first Aerial Transit Company.

In 1856, Frenchman Jean-Marie Le Bris made the first flight higher than his point of departure, by having his glider "L'Albatros artificiel" pulled by a horse on a beach. He reportedly achieved a height of 100 meters, over a distance of 200 meters.

The British advances had galvanised French researchers. Starting in 1857, Félix du Temple and his brother Luis built several models using a clockwork mechanism as a power source and later a small steam engine. In 1857 or 1858, a 680-gram (1.5 lb) model was able to fly briefly and land.

Francis Herbert Wenham presented the first paper to the newly formed Aeronautical Society (later the Royal Aeronautical Society), On Aerial Locomotion. He took Cayley's work on cambered wings further, making important findings about both the wing aerofoil section and lift distribution. To test his ideas, from 1858 he constructed several gliders, both manned and unmanned, and with up to five stacked wings. He concluded correctly that long, thin wings would be better than the bat-like ones suggested by many, because they would have more leading edge for their area. Today this relationship is known as the aspect ratio of a wing.

The latter part of the 19th century became a period of intense study, characterized by the "gentleman scientists" who represented most research efforts until the 20th century. Among them was the British scientist-philosopher and inventor Matthew Piers Watt Boulton, who wrote an important paper in 1864, On Aërial Locomotion, which also described lateral flight control. He was the first to patent an aileron control system in 1868.

In 1864, Le Comte Ferdinand Charles Honore Phillipe d'Esterno published a study On the Flight of Birds (Du Vol des Oiseaux), and the next year Louis Pierre Mouillard published an influential book The Empire of the Air (l'Empire de l'Air).

1866 saw the founding of the Aeronautical Society of Great Britain and two years later the world's first aeronautical exhibition was held at the Crystal Palace, London, where Stringfellow was awarded a £100 prize for the steam engine with the best power-to-weight ratio.

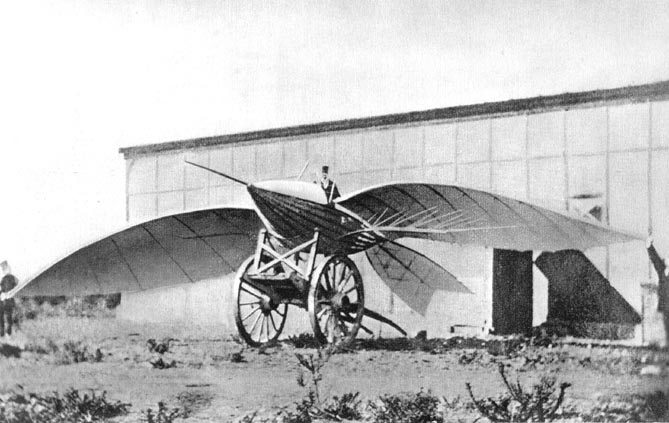
Jean-Marie Le Bris and his flying machine, Albatros II (1868)

In 1871, Wenham and Browning made the first wind tunnel. (Note: Frank H. Wenham, inventor of the wind tunnel, 1871, was a fan, driven by a steam engine, propelled air down a 12 ft (3.7 m) tube to the model.) Members of the Society used the tunnel and learned that cambered wings generated considerably more lift than expected by Cayley's Newtonian reasoning, with lift-to-drag ratios of about 5:1 at 15 degrees. This clearly demonstrated the possibility of building practical heavier-than-air flying machines: what remained were the problems of controlling and powering the craft.

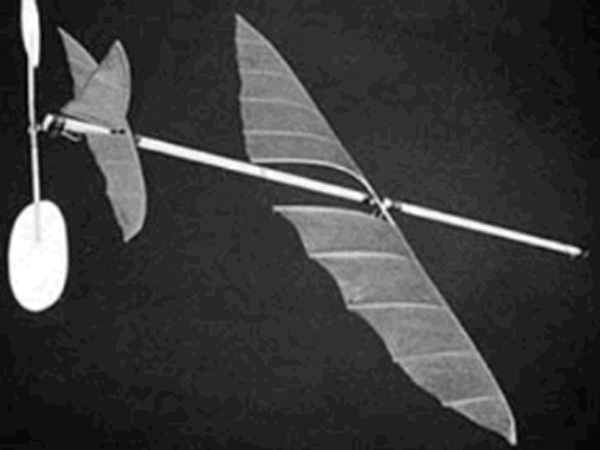
Planophore model aeroplane by Alphonse Pénaud (1871)

Alphonse Pénaud, a Frenchman living from 1850 to 1880, made significant contributions to aeronautics. He advanced the theory of wing contours and aerodynamics and constructed successful models of aeroplanes, helicopters and ornithopters. In 1871, he flew the first aerodynamically stable fixed-wing aeroplane, a model monoplane he called the "Planophore", a distance of 40 metres (130 ft). Pénaud's model incorporated several of Cayley's discoveries, including the use of a tail, wing dihedral for inherent stability, and rubber power. The planophore also had longitudinal stability, being trimmed such that the tailplane was set at a smaller angle of incidence than the wings, an original and important contribution to the theory of aeronautics.

By the 1870s, lightweight steam engines had been developed enough for their experimental use in aircraft.

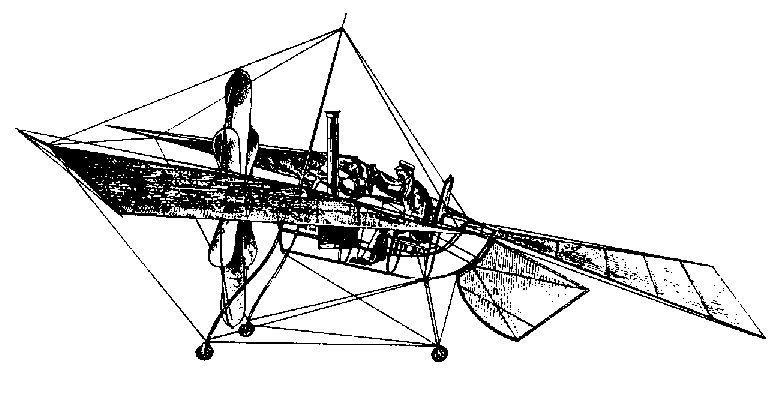
Félix du Temple's 1874 Monoplane

Félix du Temple eventually achieved a short hop with a full-size manned craft in 1874. His "Monoplane" was a large aircraft made of aluminium, with a wingspan of 42 ft 8 in (13 m) and a weight of only 176 pounds (80 kg) without the pilot. Several trials were made with the aircraft, and it achieved lift-off under its own power after launching from a ramp, glided for a short time and returned safely to the ground, making it the first successful powered hop in history, a year ahead of Moy's flight.

The Aerial Steamer, made by Thomas Moy, sometimes called the Moy-Shill Aerial Steamer, was an unmanned tandem wing aircraft driven by a 3 horsepower (2.2 kW) steam engine using methylated spirits as fuel. It was 14 feet (4.3 m) long and weighed about 216 pounds (98 kg) of which the engine accounted for 80 pounds (36 kg), and ran on three wheels. It was tested in June 1875 on a circular rolled gravel track of nearly 300 feet (91 m) diameter. It did not reach a speed of above 12 miles per hour (19 km/h), but a speed of around 35 miles per hour (56 km/h) would be necessary to lift off. However it is credited with being the first steam-powered aircraft to have left the ground under its own power by the historian Charles Gibbs-Smith.

Pénaud's later project for an amphibian aeroplane, although never built, incorporated other modern features. A tailless monoplane with a single vertical fin and twin tractor airscrews, it also featured hinged rear elevator and rudder surfaces, retractable undercarriage and a fully enclosed, instrumented cockpit.

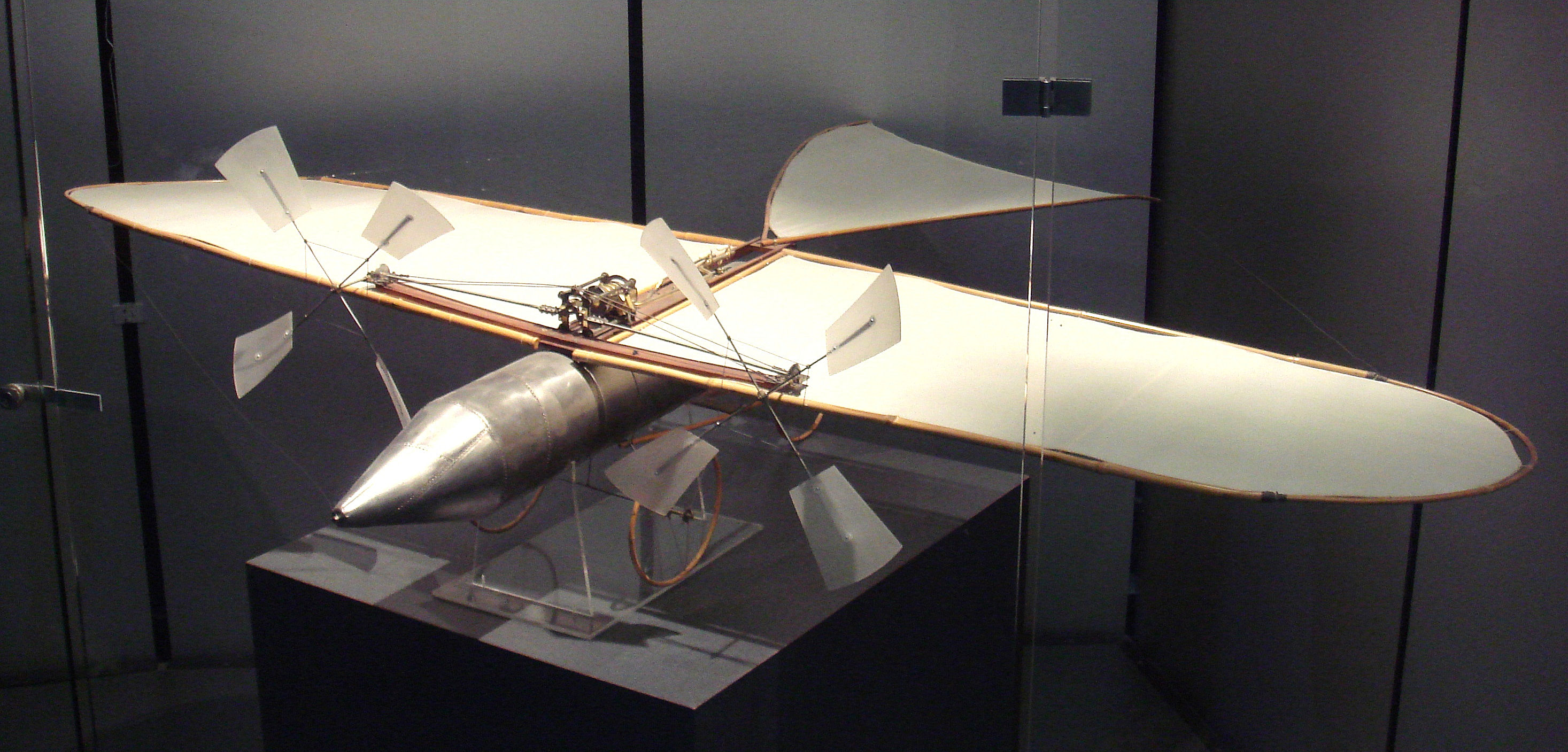
The Aéroplane of Victor Tatin (1879)

Equally authoritative as a theorist was Pénaud's fellow countryman Victor Tatin. In 1879, he flew a model which, like Pénaud's project, was a monoplane with twin tractor propellers but also had a separate horizontal tail. It was powered by compressed air, with the air tank forming the fuselage.

In Russia Alexander Mozhaiski constructed a steam-powered monoplane driven by one large tractor and two smaller pusher propellers. In 1884, it was launched from a ramp and remained airborne for 98 feet (30 m).

That same year in France, Alexandre Goupil published his work La Locomotion Aérienne (Aerial Locomotion), although the flying machine he later constructed failed to fly.

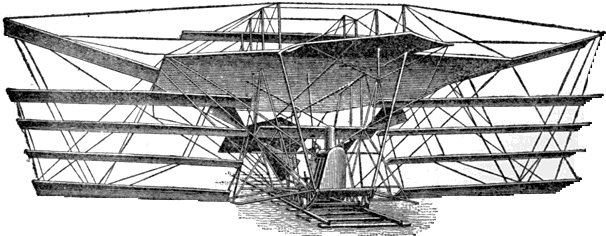
Maxim's flying machine

Sir Hiram Maxim was an American who moved to England and adopted English nationality. He chose to largely ignore his contemporaries and built his own whirling arm rig and wind tunnel. In 1889, he built a hangar and workshop in the grounds of Baldwyn's Manor at Bexley, Kent, and made many experiments. He developed a biplane design which he patented in 1891 and completed as a test rig three years later. It was an enormous machine, with a wingspan of 105 feet (32 m), a length of 145 feet (44 m), fore and aft horizontal surfaces and a crew of three. Twin propellers were powered by two lightweight compound steam engines each delivering 180 horsepower (130 kW). Overall weight was 7,000 pounds (3,200 kg). Later modifications would add more wing surfaces as shown in the illustration. Its purpose was for research and it was neither aerodynamically stable nor controllable, so it ran on a 1,800 feet (550 m) track with a second set of restraining rails to prevent it from lifting off, somewhat in the manner of a roller coaster. In 1894, the machine developed enough lift to take off, breaking one of the restraining rails and being damaged in the process. Maxim then abandoned work on it but would return to aeronautics in the 20th century to test a number of smaller designs powered by internal combustion engines.

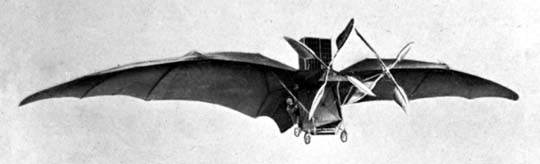
Clément Ader Avion III (1897 photograph)

One of the last of the steam-powered pioneers, like Maxim ignoring his contemporaries who had moved on (see next section), was Clément Ader. His Éole of 1890 was a bat-winged tractor monoplane which achieved a brief, uncontrolled hop, thus becoming the first heavier-than-air machine to take off under its own power. However his similar but larger Avion III of 1897, notable only for having twin steam engines, failed to fly. After a short run the machine was caught by a gust of wind, slewed off the track, and came to a stop. After this the French army withdrew its funding, but kept the results secret. The commission released in November 1910 the official reports on Ader's attempted flights, stating that they were unsuccessful.

==== Learning to glide ====
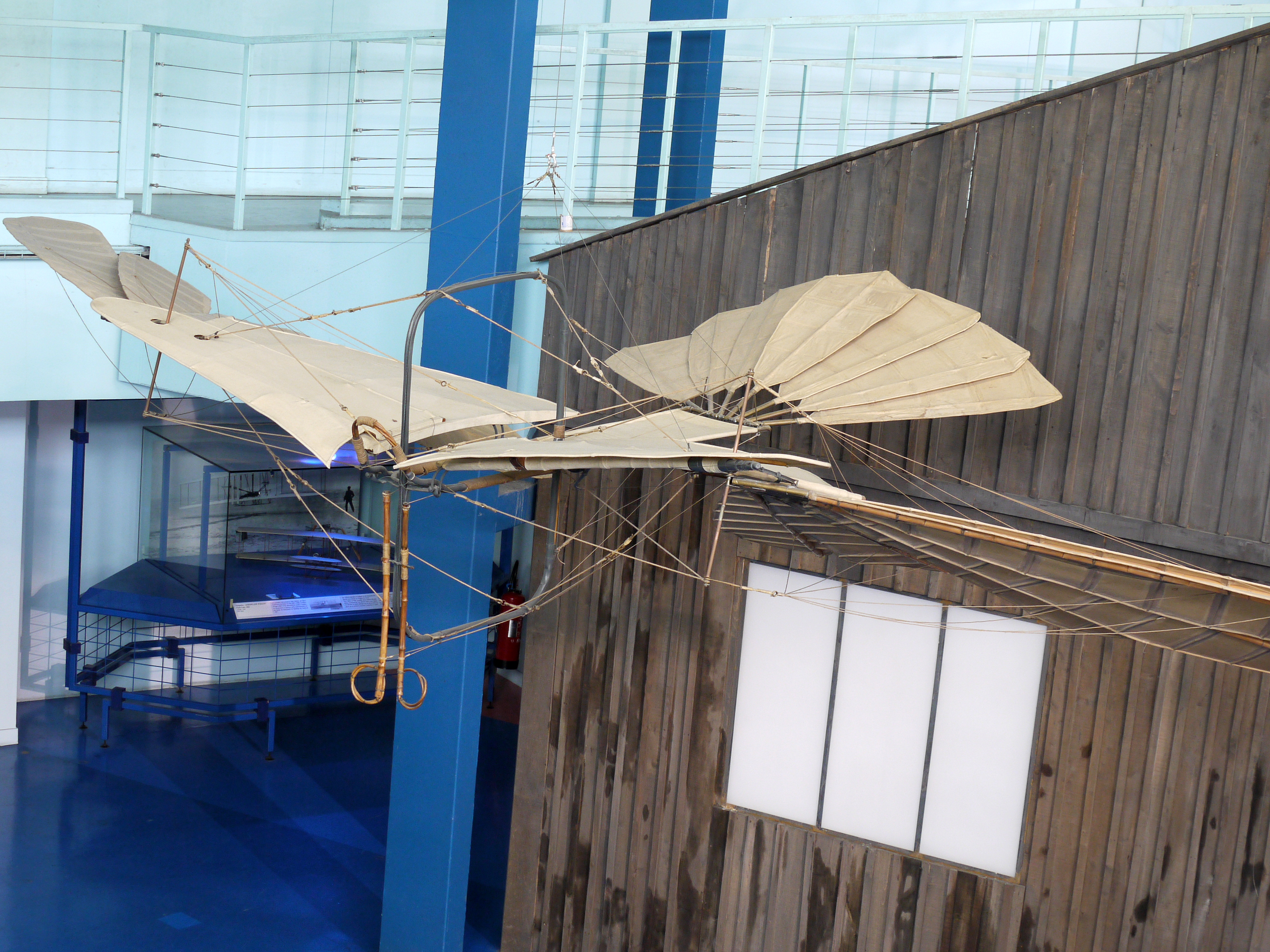
The Biot-Massia glider, restored and on display in the Musee de l'Air.

The glider constructed with the help of Massia and flown briefly by Biot in 1879 was based on the work of Mouillard and was still bird-like in form. It is preserved at the Musee de l'Air, France, and is claimed to be the earliest man-carrying flying machine still in existence.

In the last decade or so of the 19th century, a number of key figures were refining and defining the modern aeroplane. The Englishman Horatio Phillips made key contributions to aerodynamics. The German Otto Lilienthal and the American Octave Chanute worked independently on gliding flight. Lillienthal published a book on bird flight and went on, from 1891 to 1896, to construct a series of gliders, of various monoplane, biplane and triplane configurations, to test his theories. He made thousands of flights and at the time of his death was working on motor-powered gliders.

Phillips conducted extensive wind tunnel research on aerofoil sections, using steam as the working fluid. He proved the principles of aerodynamic lift foreseen by Cayley and Wenham and, from 1884, took out several patents on aerofoils. His findings underpin all modern aerofoil design. Phillips would later develop theories on the design of multiplanes, which he went on to show were unfounded.

Starting in the 1880s, advances were made in construction that led to the first truly practical gliders. Four people in particular were active: John J. Montgomery, Otto Lilienthal, Percy Pilcher and Octave Chanute. One of the first modern gliders was built by John J. Montgomery in 1883; Montgomery later claimed to have made a single successful flight with it in 1884 near San Diego and Montgomery's activities were documented by Chanute in his book Progress in Flying Machines. Montgomery discussed his flying during the 1893 Aeronautical Conference in Chicago and Chanute published Montgomery's comments in December 1893 in the American Engineer & Railroad Journal. Short hops with Montgomery's second and third gliders in 1885 and 1886 were also described by Montgomery. Between 1886 and 1896 Montgomery focused on understanding the physics of aerodynamics rather than experiment with flying machines. Another hang-glider had been constructed by Wilhelm Kress as early as 1877 near Vienna.

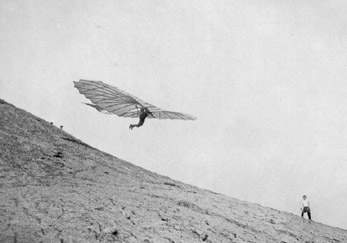
Otto Lilienthal.

Otto Lilienthal was known as the "Glider King" or "Flying Man" of Germany. He duplicated Wenham's work and greatly expanded on it in 1884, publishing his research in 1889 as Birdflight as the Basis of Aviation (Der Vogelflug als Grundlage der Fliegekunst). He also produced a series of gliders of a type now known as the hang glider, including bat-wing, monoplane and biplane forms, such as the Derwitzer Glider and Normal soaring apparatus. Starting in 1891 he became the first person to make controlled untethered glides routinely, and the first to be photographed flying a heavier-than-air machine, stimulating interest around the world. He rigorously documented his work, including photographs, and for this reason is one of the best known of the early pioneers. He also promoted the idea of "jumping before you fly", suggesting that researchers should start with gliders and work their way up, instead of simply designing a powered machine on paper and hoping it would work. Lilienthal made over 2,000 glides until his death in 1896 from injuries sustained in a glider crash. Lilienthal had also been working on small engines suitable for powering his designs at the time of his death.

Picking up where Lilienthal left off, Octave Chanute took up aircraft design after an early retirement and funded the development of several gliders. In the summer of 1896, his team flew several of their designs many times at Miller Beach, Indiana, eventually deciding that the best was a biplane design. Like Lilienthal, he documented his work and also photographed it, and was busy corresponding with like-minded researchers around the world. Chanute was particularly interested in solving the problem of aerodynamic instability of the aircraft in flight, which birds compensate for by instant corrections, but which humans would have to address either with stabilizing and control surfaces or by moving the center of gravity of the aircraft, as Lilienthal did. The most disconcerting problem was longitudinal instability (divergence), because as the angle of attack of a wing increases, the center of pressure moves forward and makes the angle increase yet more. Without immediate correction, the craft will pitch up and stall. Much more difficult to understand was the relationship between lateral and directional control.

In Britain, Percy Pilcher, who had worked for Maxim and had built and successfully flown several gliders during the mid to late 1890s, constructed a prototype powered aircraft in 1899 which, recent research has shown, would have been capable of flight. However, like Lilienthal he died in a glider accident before he was able to test it.

Publications, particularly Octave Chanute's Progress in Flying Machines of 1894 and James Means' The Problem of Manflight (1894) and Aeronautical Annuals (1895–1897) helped bring current research and events to a wider audience.

The invention of the box kite during this period by the Australian Lawrence Hargrave led to the development of the practical biplane. In 1894, Hargrave linked four of his kites together, added a sling seat, and flew 16 feet (4.9 m). By demonstrating to a sceptical public that it was possible to build a safe and stable flying machine, Hargrave opened the door to other inventors and pioneers. Hargrave devoted most of his life to constructing a machine that would fly. He believed passionately in open communication within the scientific community and would not patent his inventions. Instead, he scrupulously published the results of his experiments in order that a mutual interchange of ideas may take place with other inventors working in the same field, so as to expedite joint progress. By 1889, he had constructed a rotary engine driven by compressed air.

Octave Chanute became convinced that multiple wing planes were more effective than a monoplane and introduced the "strut-wire" braced wing structure which, with its combination of rigidity and lightness, would in the form of the biplane come to dominate aircraft design for decades to come.

Even balloon-jumping began to succeed. In 1905, Daniel Maloney was carried by balloon in a tandem-wing glider designed by John Montgomery to an altitude of 4,000 feet (1,200 m) before being released, gliding down and landing at a predetermined location as part of a large public demonstration of aerial flight at Santa Clara, California. However, after several successful flights, during an ascension in July 1905, a rope from the balloon struck the glider, and the glider suffered structural failure after release, resulting in Maloney's death.

=== Adding power ===
==== Whitehead ====
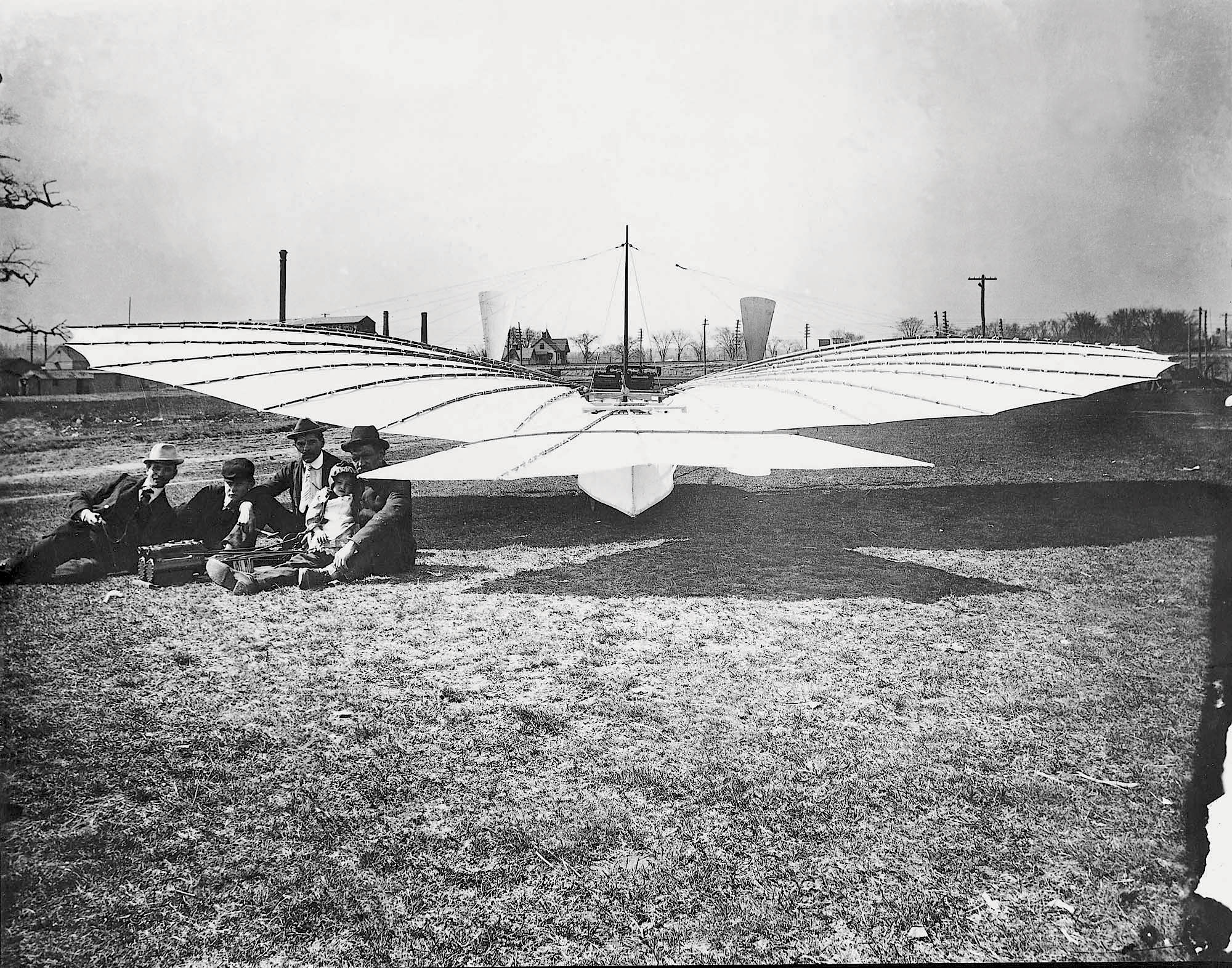
The No. 21 monoplane seen from the rear. Whitehead sits beside it with daughter Rose in his lap; others in the photo are not identified.

Gustave Weißkopf was a German who emigrated to the U.S., where he soon changed his name to Whitehead. From 1897 to 1915 he designed and built flying machines and engines. On 14 August 1901 Whitehead claimed to have carried out a controlled, powered flight in his Number 21 monoplane at Fairfield, Connecticut. An account of the alleged flight was published in the Bridgeport Sunday Herald and was repeated in many U.S. newspapers and a few overseas. Whitehead claimed two more flights on 17 January 1902, using his Number 22 monoplane. He described it as having a 40 horsepower (30 kW) motor with twin tractor propellers and controlled by differential propeller speed and rudder. He claimed to have flown a 10 kilometres (6.2 mi) circle.

Whitehead's claims are generally rejected by aviation historians. The Smithsonian Institution and Royal Aeronautical Society are among those who do not accept that Whitehead flew as reported. In March 2013 Jane's All the World's Aircraft published an editorial by Paul Jackson which accepted Whitehead's flight as the first manned, powered, controlled flight of a heavier-than-air craft. The corporate owner of Jane's subsequently distanced itself from the editorial, stating "the article reflected Mr. Jackson's opinion on the issue and not that of IHS Jane's".

==== Langley ====
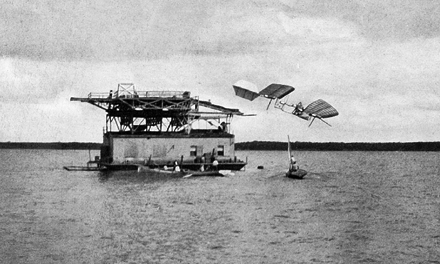
First failure of Langley's manned Aerodrome on the Potomac River, 7 October 1903

After a distinguished career in astronomy and shortly before becoming Secretary of the Smithsonian Institution, Samuel Pierpont Langley started a serious investigation into aerodynamics at what is today the University of Pittsburgh. In 1891, he published Experiments in Aerodynamics detailing his research, and then turned to building his designs. He hoped to achieve automatic aerodynamic stability, so he gave little consideration to in-flight control. On 6 May 1896, Langley's Aerodrome No. 5 made the first successful sustained flight of an unpiloted, engine-driven heavier-than-air craft of substantial size. It was launched from a spring-actuated catapult mounted on top of a houseboat on the Potomac River near Quantico, Virginia. Two flights were made that afternoon, one of 1,005 metres (3,297 ft) and a second of 700 metres (2,300 ft), at a speed of approximately 25 miles per hour (40 km/h). On both occasions, the Aerodrome No. 5 landed in the water as planned, because in order to save weight, it was not equipped with landing gear. On 28 November 1896, another successful flight was made with the Aerodrome No. 6. This flight, of 1,460 metres (4,790 ft), was witnessed and photographed by Alexander Graham Bell. The Aerodrome No. 6 was actually Aerodrome No. 4 greatly modified. So little remained of the original aircraft that it was given a new designation.

With the successes of the Aerodrome No. 5 and No. 6, Langley started looking for funding to build a full-scale man-carrying version of his designs. Spurred by the Spanish–American War, the U.S. government granted him $50,000 to develop a man-carrying flying machine for aerial reconnaissance. Langley planned on building a scaled-up version known as the Aerodrome A, and started with the smaller Quarter-scale Aerodrome, which flew twice on 18 June 1901, and then again with a newer and more powerful engine in 1903.

With the basic design apparently successfully tested, he then turned to the problem of a suitable engine. He contracted Stephen Balzer to build one, but was disappointed when it delivered only 8 horsepower (6.0 kW) instead of the 12 horsepower (8.9 kW) he expected. Langley's assistant, Charles M. Manly, then reworked the design into a five-cylinder water-cooled radial that delivered 52 horsepower (39 kW) at 950 rpm, a feat that took years to duplicate. Now with both power and a design, Langley put the two together with great hopes.

To his dismay, the resulting aircraft proved to be too fragile. Simply scaling up the original small models resulted in a design that was too weak to hold itself together. Two launches in late 1903 both ended with the Aerodrome immediately crashing into the water. The pilot, Manly, was rescued each time. Also, the aircraft's control system was inadequate to allow quick pilot responses, and it had no method of lateral control, and the Aerodrome's aerial stability was marginal.

Langley's attempts to gain further funding failed, and his efforts ended. Nine days after his second abortive launch on 8 December, the Wright brothers successfully flew their Flyer. Glenn Curtiss made 93 modifications to the Aerodrome and flew this very different aircraft in 1914. Without acknowledging the modifications, the Smithsonian Institution asserted that Langley's Aerodrome was the first machine "capable of flight". The Smithsonian eventually retracted this claim in 1928.

==== Richard Pearse ====
Richard William Pearse (3 December 1877 – 29 July 1953) was a New Zealand farmer and inventor who performed pioneering aviation experiments. Witnesses interviewed many years afterwards describe observing Pearse flying and landing a powered heavier-than-air machine on 31 March 1903.

==== The Wright brothers ====
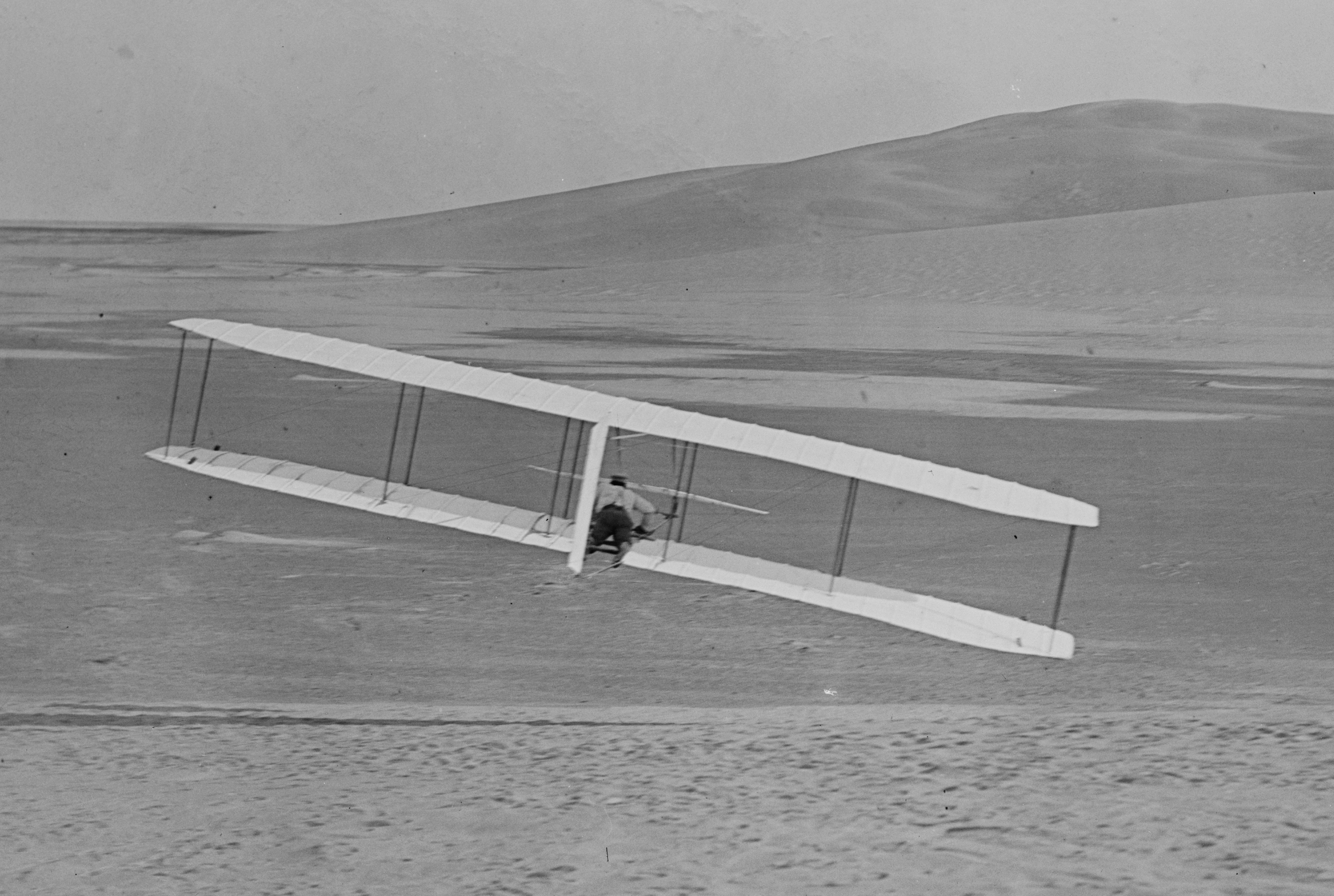
Wright glider, coordinated turn using wing-warping and rudder, 1902.

The Wrights solved both the control and power problems that confronted aeronautical pioneers. They invented roll control using wing warping and combined roll with simultaneous yaw control using a steerable rear rudder. Although wing-warping as a means of roll control was used only briefly during the early history of aviation, the innovation of combining roll and yaw control was a fundamental advance in flight control. For pitch control, the Wrights used a forward elevator (canard), another design element that later became outmoded.

The Wrights made rigorous wind-tunnel tests of airfoils and flight tests of full-size gliders. They not only built a working powered aircraft, the Wright Flyer, but also significantly advanced the science of aeronautical engineering.

They concentrated on the controllability of unpowered aircraft before attempting to fly a powered design. From 1900 to 1902, they built and flew a series of three gliders. The first two were much less efficient than the Wrights expected, based on experiments and writings of their 19th-century predecessors. Their 1900 glider had only about half the lift they anticipated, and the 1901 glider performed even more poorly, until makeshift modifications made it serviceable.

Seeking answers, the Wrights constructed their own wind tunnel and equipped it with a sophisticated measuring device to calculate lift and drag of 200 different model-size wing designs they created. As a result, the Wrights corrected earlier mistakes in calculations of lift and drag and used this knowledge to construct their 1902 glider, third in the series. It became the first manned, heavier-than-air flying machine that was mechanically controllable in all three axes: pitch, roll and yaw. Its pioneering design also included wings with a higher aspect ratio than the previous gliders. The brothers successfully flew the 1902 glider hundreds of times, and it performed far better than their earlier two versions.

To obtain adequate power for their engine-driven Flyer, the Wrights designed and built a low-powered internal combustion engine. Using their wind tunnel data, they designed and carved wooden propellers that were more efficient than any before, enabling them to gain adequate performance from their low engine power. The Flyer's design was also influenced by the desire of the Wrights to teach themselves to fly safely without unreasonable risk to life and limb, and to make crashes survivable. The limited engine power resulted in low flying speeds and the need to take off into a headwind.

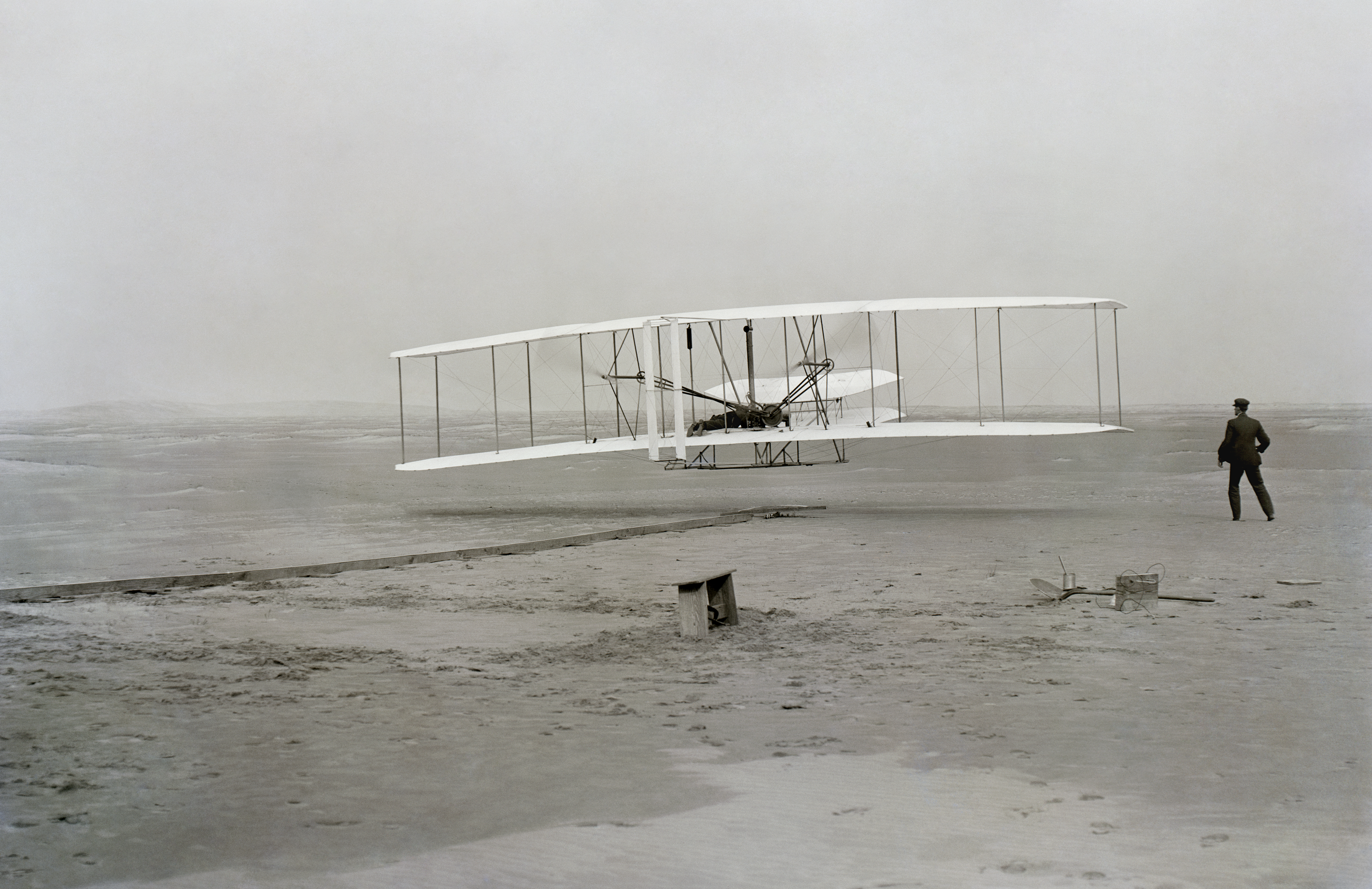
The Wright Flyer: the first sustained flight with a powered, controlled aircraft.

According to the Smithsonian Institution and Fédération Aéronautique Internationale (FAI), the Wrights made the first sustained, controlled, powered heavier-than-air manned flight at Kill Devil Hills, North Carolina, 4 miles (6.4 km) south of Kitty Hawk, North Carolina, on 17 December 1903. The first flight by Orville Wright, of 120 feet (37 m) in 12 seconds, was recorded in a famous photograph. In the fourth flight of the same day, Wilbur Wright flew 852 feet (260 m) in 59 seconds. Modern analysis by Professor Fred E. C. Culick and Henry R. Rex (1985) has demonstrated that the 1903 Wright Flyer was so unstable as to be almost unmanageable by anyone but the Wrights, who had trained themselves in the 1902 glider.

The Wrights continued developing their flying machines and flying at Huffman Prairie near Dayton, Ohio, in 1904–05. After a crash in 1905, they rebuilt the Flyer III and made important design changes. They almost doubled the size of the elevator and rudder and moved them about twice the distance from the wings. They added two fixed vertical vanes (called "blinkers") between the elevators, and gave the wings a very slight dihedral. They disconnected the rudder from the wing-warping control, and as in all future aircraft, placed it on a separate control handle. The Flyer III became the first practical aircraft (though without wheels and using a launching device), flying consistently under full control and bringing its pilot back to the starting point safely and landing without damage. On 5 October 1905, Wilbur flew 24 miles (39 km) in 39 minutes 23 seconds".

Eventually the Wrights would abandon the foreplane altogether, with the Model B of 1910 instead having a tail plane in the manner which was by then becoming conventional.

According to the April 1907 issue of the Scientific American magazine, the Wright brothers seemed to have the most advanced knowledge of heavier-than-air navigation at the time. However, the same magazine issue also claimed that no public flight had been made in the United States before its April 1907 issue. Hence, they devised the Scientific American Aeronautic Trophy in order to encourage the development of a heavier-than-air flying machine.

=== The first practical aircraft ===
Once powered, controlled flight had been achieved, progress was still needed to create a practical flying machine for general use. This period leading up to World War I is sometimes called the pioneer era of aviation.

==== Reliable power ====
The history of early powered flight is very much the history of early engine construction. The Wrights designed their own engines. They used a single flight engine, a 12 horsepower (8.9 kW) water-cooled four-cylinder inline type with five main bearings and fuel injection. Whitehead's craft was powered by two engines of his design: a ground engine of 10 horsepower (7.5 kW) which drove the front wheels in an effort to reach takeoff speed and a 20 horsepower (15 kW) acetylene engine powering the propellers. Whitehead was an experienced machinist, and he is reported to have raised funds for his aircraft by making and selling engines to other aviators. Most early engines were neither powerful nor reliable enough for practical use, and the development of improved engines went hand-in-hand with improvements in the airframes themselves.

In Europe, Léon Levavasseur's Antoinette 8V pioneering example of the V-8 engine format, first patented in 1902, dominated flight for several years after it was introduced in 1906, powering many notable craft of that era. Incorporating direct fuel injection, evaporative water cooling and other advanced features, it generated around 50 horsepower (37 kW).

The British Green C.4 of 1908 followed the Wright's pattern of a four-cylinder inline water-cooled design but produced 52 horsepower (39 kW). It powered many successful pioneer aircraft including those of A.V. Roe.

Horizontally opposed designs were also produced. The four-cylinder water-cooled de Havilland Iris achieved 45 horsepower (34 kW) but was little used, while the successful two-cylinder Nieuport design achieved 28 hp (21 kW) in 1910.

1909 saw radial engine forms rise to significance. The Anzani 3-cylinder semi-radial or fan engine of 1909 (also built in a true, 120° cylinder angle radial form) developed only 25 horsepower (19 kW) but was much lighter than the Antoinette, and was chosen by Louis Blériot for his cross-Channel flight. More radical was the Seguin brothers' series of Gnôme rotary radial engines, starring with the Gnome Omega 50 horsepower (37 kW) air-cooled seven-cylinder rotary engine in 1906. In a rotary engine, the crankshaft is fixed to the airframe and the whole engine casing and cylinders rotate with the propeller. Although this type had been introduced as long ago as 1887 by Lawrence Hargrave, improvements made to the Gnome created a robust, relatively reliable and lightweight design which revolutionised aviation and would see continuous development over the next ten years. Fuel was introduced into each cylinder direct from the crankcase meaning that only an exhaust valve was required. The larger and more powerful nine-cylinder, 80 horsepower Le Rhône 9C rotary was introduced in 1913 and was widely adopted for military use.

Inline and vee types remained popular, with the German company Mercedes producing a series of water-cooled six-cylinder models. In 1913, they introduced the highly successful 75 kilowatts (101 hp) D.I series.

==== Lift and efficiency ====
The lightness and strength of the biplane is offset by the inefficiency inherent in placing two wings so close together. Biplane and monoplane designs vied with each other, with both still in production by the outbreak of war in 1914.

A notable development, although a failure, was the first cantilever monoplane ever built. The Antoinette Monobloc of 1911 had a fully enclosed cockpit and faired undercarriage but its V-8 engine's 50 horsepower (37 kW) output was not enough for it to fly for more than a few feet at most. More successful was the Deperdussin braced monoplane, which won the inaugural 1913 Schneider Trophy race flown by Maurice Prévost, completing 28 circuits of the 10 km (6.2 mi) course with an average speed of 73.63 kilometres per hour (45.75 mph).

Triplanes too were experimented with, notably a series built between 1909 and 1910 by the British pioneer A.V. Roe. Going one better with four wings the quadruplane too made rare appearances. The multiplane, having large numbers of very thin wings, was also experimented with, most successfully by Horatio Phillips. His final prototype confirmed the inefficiency and poor performance of the idea.

Other radical approaches to wing design were also being tried. The Scottish-born inventor Alexander Graham Bell devised a cellular octahedral wing form which, like the multiplane, proved disappointingly inefficient. Other lacklustre performers included the Edwards Rhomboidal, the Lee-Richards annular wing and varying numbers of wings one after the other in tandem.

Many of these early experimental forms were in principle quite practical and have since reappeared.

==== Stability and control ====
Early work had focused primarily on making a craft stable enough to fly but failed to offer full controllability, while the Wrights had sacrificed stability in order to make their Flyer fully controllable. A practical aircraft requires both. Although stability had been achieved by several designs, the principles were not fully understood and progress was erratic. The aileron slowly replaced wing warping for lateral control although designers sometimes, as with the Blériot XI, returned briefly to wing warping. Similarly, all-flying tail surfaces gave way to fixed stabilizers with hinged control surfaces attached. The canard pusher configuration of the early Wright Flyers was supplanted by tractor propeller aircraft designs.

In France, progress was relatively rapid.

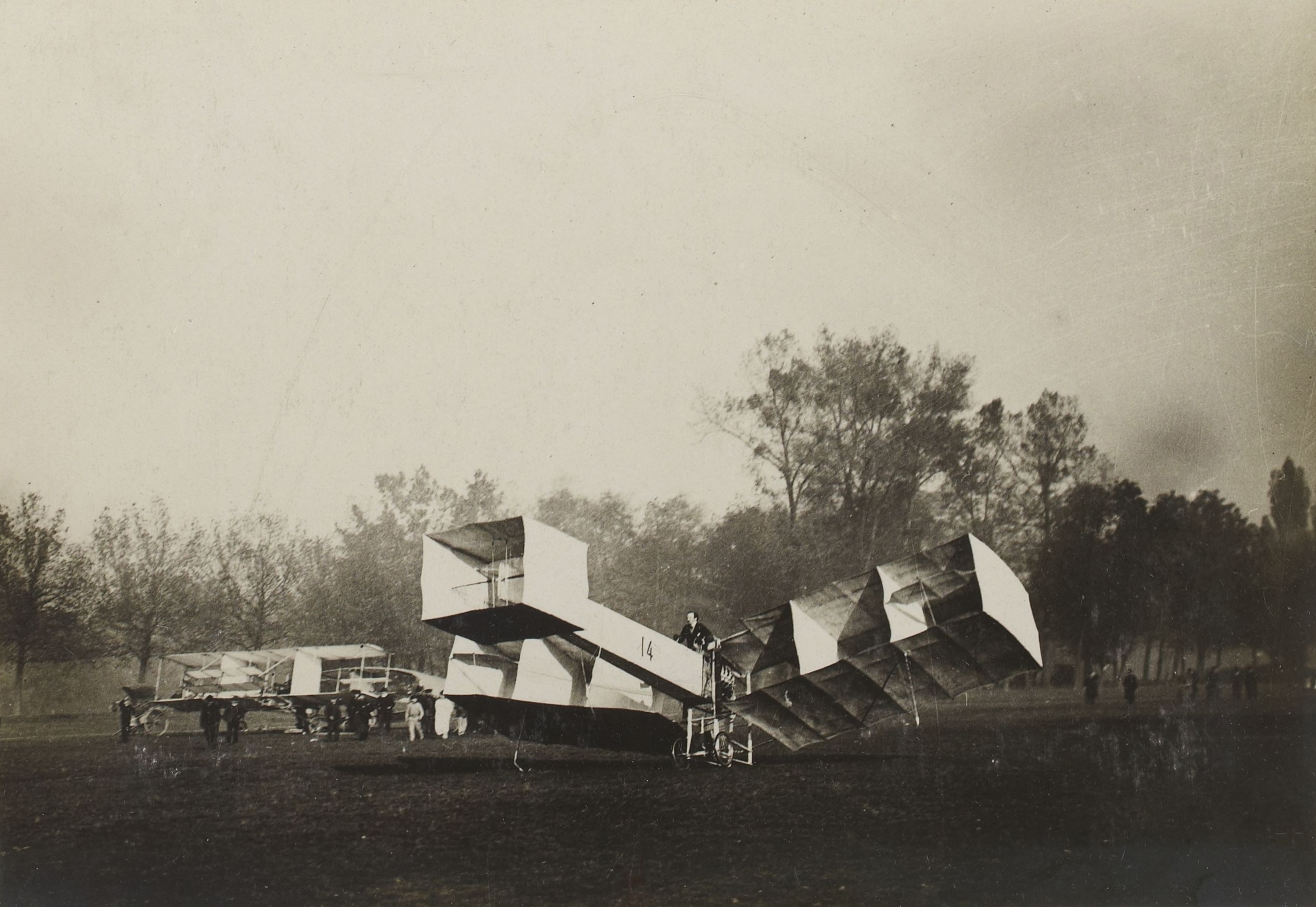
The Santos-Dumont 14-bis in its final configuration (after the ailerons were added).

On October 23 and November 12, 1906, the Brazilian Alberto Santos-Dumont made public flights in France with his 14-bis. A canard pusher biplane with pronounced wing dihedral, it had a Hargrave-style box-cell wing with a forward-mounted "boxkite" assembly which was movable to act as both elevator and rudder. His flight was the first made by a powered heavier-than-air machine to be verified by the Aéro-Club de France, and won the Deutsch-Archdeacon Prize for the first officially observed flight of more than 25 metres (82 ft). It later set the first world record recognized by the Federation Aeronautique Internationale by flying 220 metres (720 ft) in 21.5 seconds. It had no lateral control, so after these flights, in late November, he added auxiliary surfaces between the wings as primitive ailerons, and made a few more flights.

The next year Louis Blériot flew the Blériot VII, a tractor monoplane with full three-axis control using the horizontal tail surfaces as combined elevators and ailerons. Its immediate descendant, the Blériot VIII, was the very first airframe to bring together the recognizable elements of the modern aircraft flight control system in April 1908. Where Horatio Phillips and Traian Vuia had failed, Blériot's was the first practical tractor monoplane and marked the start of a trend in French aviation. By 1909, he had developed this configuration to the point where the Blériot XI was able to cross the English Channel, among other refinements using the tail surfaces only as elevators and using wing warping for lateral control. Another design that appeared in 1907 was the Voisin biplane. This lacked any provision for lateral control, and could only make shallow turns using only rudder control, but was flown with increasing success during the year by Henri Farman, and on 13 January 1908 he won the 50,000 francs Deutsch de la Meurthe-Archdeacon Grand Prix de l'Aviation for being the first aviator to complete an officially observed 1 kilometre closed circuit flight, including taking off and landing under the aircraft's own power.

The designs of the French pioneer Léon Levavasseur are better known by the name of the Antoinette company which he founded. His Antoinette IV of 1908 was a monoplane of what is now the conventional configuration, with tailplane and fin each bearing movable control surfaces, and ailerons on the wings. The ailerons were not sufficiently effective and on later models were replaced by wing warping.

At the end of 1908, the Voisin brothers sold an aircraft ordered by Henri Farman to J. T. C. Moore-Brabazon. Angered, Farman built his own aircraft, adapting the Voisin design by adding ailerons. Following further modifications to the tail surfaces and ailerons, the Farman III became the most popular aeroplane sold between 1909 and 1911, and was widely imitated. In Britain, the American expatriate Samuel Cody flew an aircraft similar in layout to the Wright flyer in 1908, incorporating a tailplane as well as a large front elevator. In 1910, an improved model fitted with between-wing ailerons won the Michelin Cup competition, while Geoffrey de Havilland's second Farman-style aircraft had ailerons on the upper wing and became the Royal Aircraft Factory F.E.1. The Bristol Boxkite, a copy of the Farman III, was manufactured in quantity. In the USA Glenn Curtiss had flown first the AEA June Bug and then his Golden Flyer, which in 1910 achieved the first naval deck landing and takeoff. Meanwhile, the Wrights themselves had also been wrestling with the problem of achieving both stability and control, experimenting further with the foreplane before first adding a second small plane at the tail and then finally removing the foreplane altogether. They announced their two-seat Model B in 1910 and licensed it for production in 1911 as the Burgess Model F.

Many other more radical layouts were tried, with only a few showing any promise. In the United Kingdom, J. W. Dunne developed a series of tailless pusher designs having swept wings with a conical upper surface. His D.5 biplane flew in 1910 and proved fully stable. Dunne deliberately avoided full three-axis control, devising instead a system which was easier to operate and which he regarded as far safer in practice. Dunne's system would not be widely adopted. His tailless design reached its peak with the D.8 which was manufactured under license in France by Nieuport and in the US as the Burgess-Dunne, however it was rejected as a practical warplane by the British Army, in which Dunne was an officer, because it was too stable and hence not manoeuvrable enough in battle.

==== Seaplanes ====
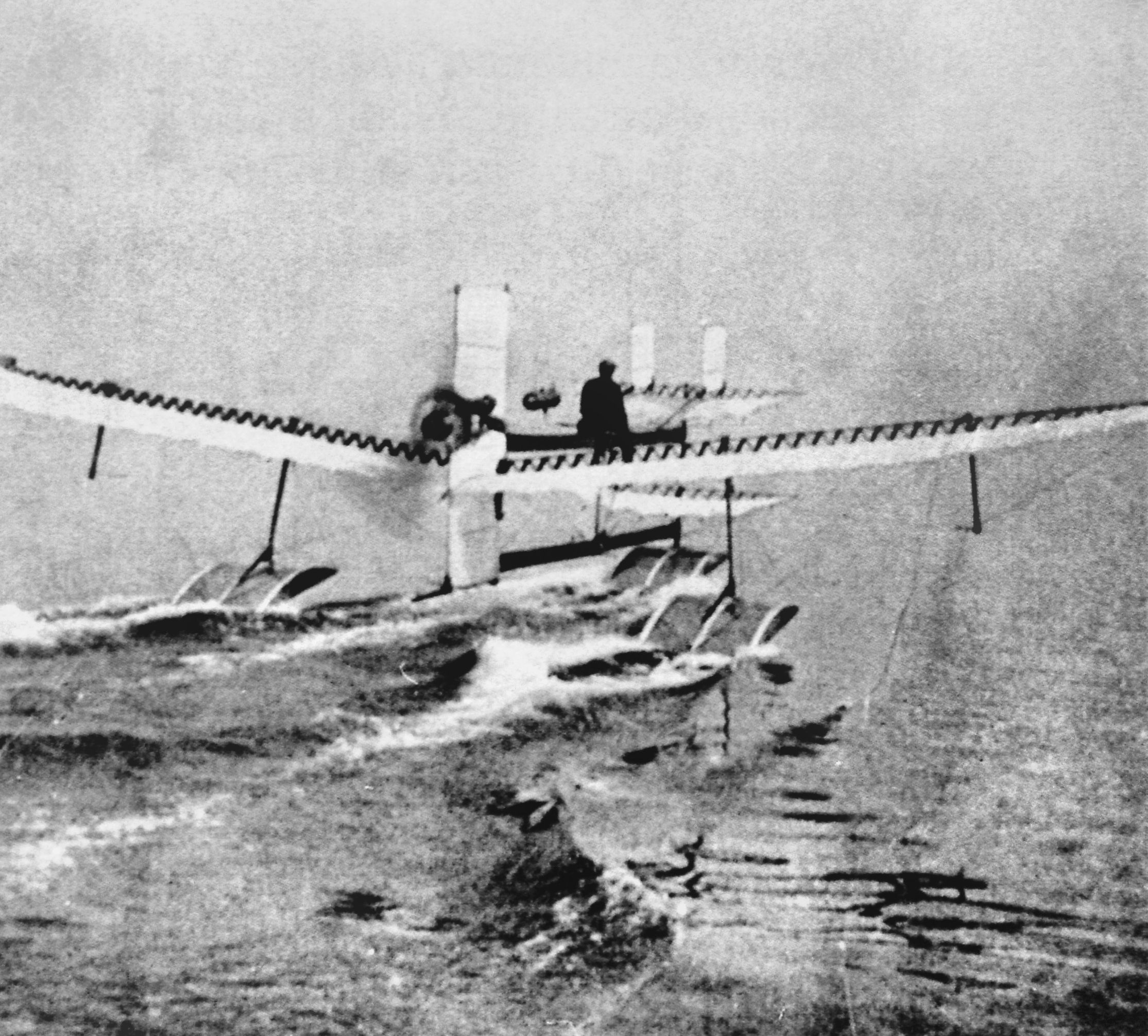
Henri Fabre on his Hydravion.

1901 in Austria, Wilhelm Kress fails to take off in his underpowered Drachenflieger, a floatplane featuring twin pontoons made of aluminium and three wings in tandem.

1910 in France, Henri Fabre makes the first seaplane flight in his Hydravion. It was a monoplane with a biplane foreplane and three short floats in tricycle layout.

1912 The world's first seaplane carrier, the French Navy's Foudre, embarks her first floatplane, a Voisin Canard.

A problem with early seaplanes was the tendency for suction between the water and the aircraft as speed increased, holding the aircraft down and hindering takeoff. The British designer John Cyril Porte invented the technique of placing a step in the bottom of the aircraft to break the suction, and this was incorporated in the 1914 Curtiss Model H.

=== Military use ===
In 1909, aeroplanes remained frail and of little practical use. The limited engine power available meant that the effective payload was extremely limited. The basic structural and materials technology of the airframes mostly consisted of hardwood materials or steel tubing, braced with steel wires and covered in linen fabric doped with a flammable stiffener and sealant. The need to save weight meant that most aircraft were structurally fragile, and not infrequently broke up in flight especially when performing violent manoeuvres, such as pulling out of a steep dive, which would be required in combat.

Even so, these evolving flying machines were recognised to be not just toys, but weapons in the making. In 1909, the Italian staff officer Giulio Douhet remarked:

The sky is about to become another battlefield no less important than the battlefields on land and sea....In order to conquer the air, it is necessary to deprive the enemy of all means of flying, by striking at him in the air, at his bases of operation, or at his production centers. We had better get accustomed to this idea, and prepare ourselves.

— Giulio Douhet (Italian staff officer), 1909

In 1911, Captain Bertram Dickson, the first British military officer to fly and the first British military officer to perform an aerial reconnaissance mission in a fixed-wing aircraft during army manoeuvres in 1910, predicted the military use of aircraft and the ensuing development and escalation of aerial combat in a submission to the UK Technical Sub-Committee for Imperial Defence.

Bombs were dropped from an aeroplane for the first time when United States Army Lieutenant Paul W. Beck dropped sandbags simulating bombs over Los Angeles, California.

Aeroplanes were first used in warfare during the Italo-Turkish War of 1911–1912. The first operational use took place on 23 October 1911, when Captain Carlo Piazza made a flight near Benghazi in a Blériot XI. The first aerial bombardment followed shortly afterwards on 1 November, when Second Lieutenant Giulio Gavotti dropped four bombs on two bases held by the Turks. The first photographic reconnaissance flight took place in March 1912, also flown by Captain Piazza.

Some types developed during this period would see military service into, or even throughout, World War I. These include the Etrich Taube of 1910, Fokker Spin of 1911, Royal Aircraft Factory BE.2, Sopwith Tabloid/Schneider and a variety of obsolescent types that would be used for pilot training. The Sikorsky Ilya Muromets (also known as Sikorsky S-22) was the first four-engined aircraft to ever enter production and the largest of its day, the prototype first flying in 1913 just before the outbreak of war. The type would go on to see service in both bomber and transport roles.

=== Helicopters ===
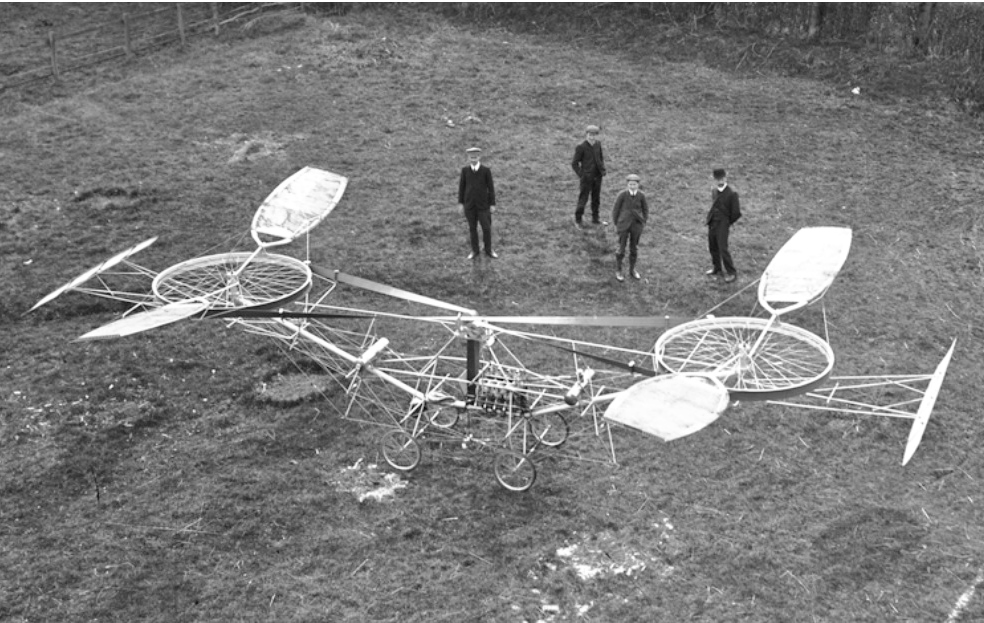
Paul Cornu's helicopter of 1907.

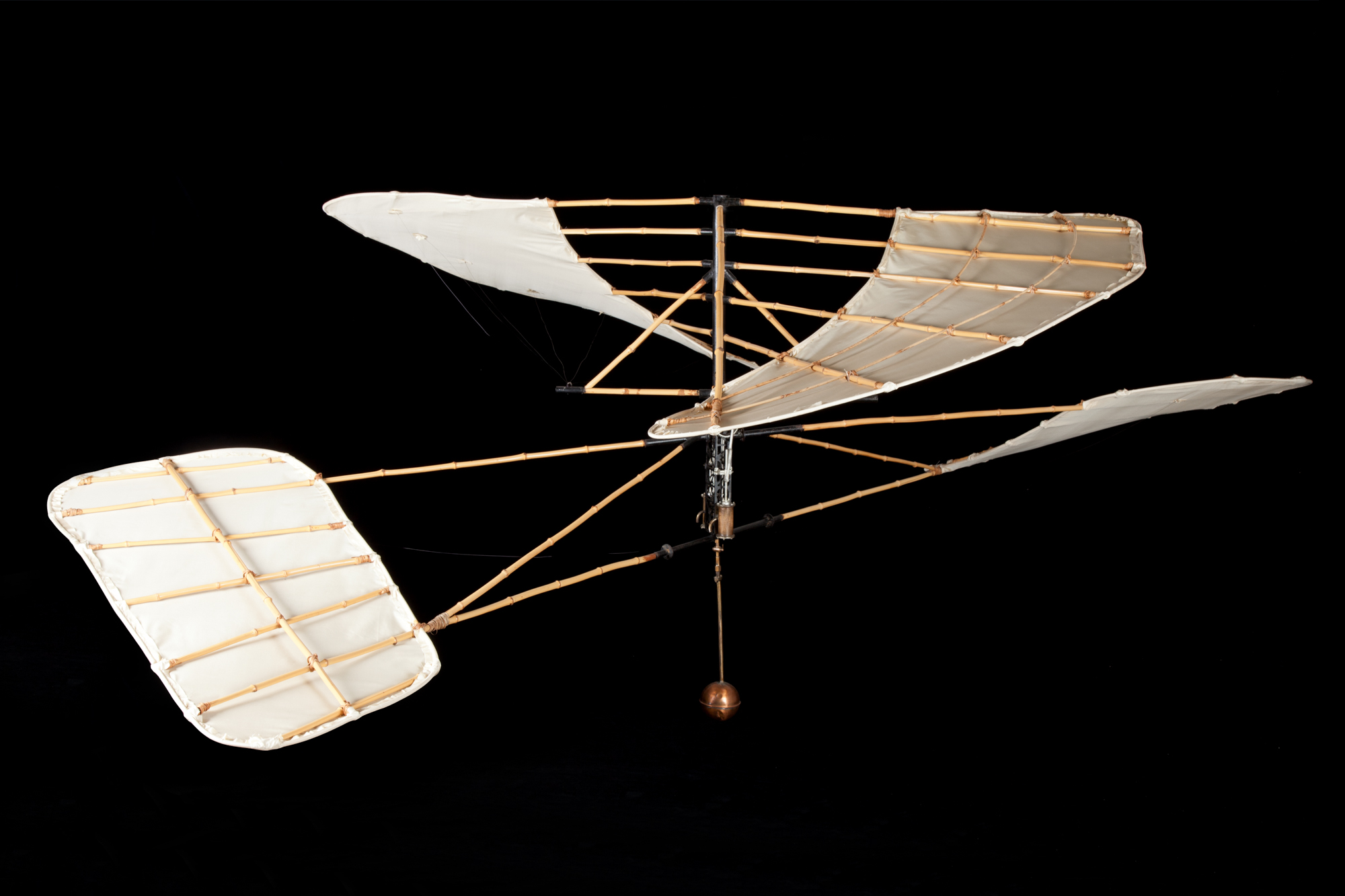
Experimental helicopter by Enrico Forlanini (1877), exhibited at the Museo nazionale della scienza e della tecnologia Leonardo da Vinci of Milan

The early work on powered rotor lift was followed up by later investigators, independently from the development of fixed-wing aircraft.

In 19th century France an association was set up to collaborate on helicopter designs, of which there were many. In 1863 Gustave de Ponton d'Amécourt constructed a model using the established counter-rotating rotors. Initially powered by steam it failed, but a clockwork version did fly. Other designs, covering a wide variety of forms, included Pomés and De la Pauze (1871), Pénaud, Achenbach (1874), Dieuaide (1887), Melikoff (1877), Forlanini (1877), Castel (1878), and Dandrieux (1878–79). Of these, Forlanini's steam-powered contra-rotating model flew for 20 seconds, reaching a height of 13 metres (43 ft), and Dandrieux' rubber-powered model also flew.

Hiram Maxim's father conceived of a helicopter powered by two counter-rotating rotors, but was unable to find a powerful enough engine to build it. Hiram himself sketched out plans for a helicopter in 1872 before turning his attention to fixed-wing flight.

In 1907, the French Breguet-Richet Gyroplane No. 1 lifted off in a "tethered" test flight, becoming the first manned helicopter to rise from the ground. It rose about 60 centimetres (24 in) and hovered for a minute. However, the flight proved to be extremely unsteady.

Two months later at Lisenux, France, Paul Cornu made the first free flight in a manned rotary-winged craft in his Cornu helicopter, lifting to 30 centimetres (12 in) and remaining aloft for 20 seconds.

== See also ==
- Aviation accidents and incidents
- Aviation in the pioneer era (1903–1914)
- Aviation in World War I
- Claims to the first powered flight
- Timeline of aviation
