= Jean Marie Le Bris =

French aviator

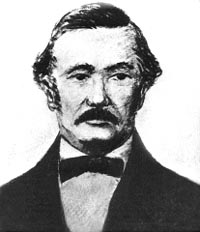
- Portrait of Jean Marie Le Bris c.1865 by Henri Schneider
- Born: 25 March 1817; Concarneau, Brittany, France
- Died: 17 February 1872 (aged 54); Douarnenez, Brittany, France
- Citizenship: French
- Known for: Design and construction of glider aircraft, development of flight control systems, first to successfully fly on board of a heavier-than-the-air glider aircraft.
- Scientific career
- Fields: Aviation, aeronautics, aeronautical engineering

Jean Marie Le Bris (25 March 1817, Concarneau – 17 February 1872, Douarnenez) was a French aviator, born in Concarneau, Brittany who built two glider aircraft and performed at least one flight on board of his first machine in late 1856. His name (French pronunciation: [ʒɑ̃ maʁi lə bʁis]) is sometimes spelled Jean-Marie Le Bris, and he is also known as Yann Vari Ar Briz (Breton pronunciation: [jɑ̃n vari ar briz\s]) in Breton language.

== Early life ==
Jean Marie Le Bris was born in Concarneau, Brittany, France on 25 March 1817 at 5AM local time. He was the third child of Michel Marie Le Bris, boat captain, and Perrine Rosalie Le Bris née Riou.

Jean Marie Le Bris married Jeanne Louise Alexandrine Kerisit in Pont-Croix on 18 February 1844. After Jeanne Louise died in March 1854, he remarried with Ernestine Esprit Hervé on 20 November 1854.

== Life at sea ==
A sailor and sea captain, Le Bris sailed around the world observing the flight of the albatross. Although he sailed around the world, his true ambition was to fly. During his trips, especially the navigation of the Cape Horn in 1839, he observed sea birds and captured an albatross to investigate the flight mechanics of birds and to understand the interaction between the wings and the air.

== First glider aircraft: the Winged Boat ==
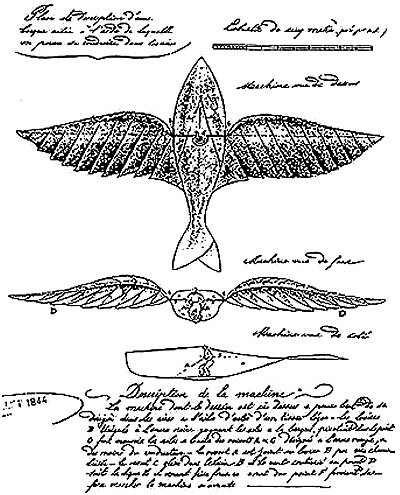
Sketches of the 1857 Patent No. 31166 by Jean Marie Le Bris

Le Bris built two different gliders. The first one, sometimes nicknamed La barque ailée ("The Winged Boat"), is the subject of his patent No. 31166 of 9 March 1857 on an "aerial car". In late 1856, Jean Marie Le Bris flew briefly with this aircraft on the beach of Sainte-Anne-la-Palud (Plonévez-Porzay, Brittany), nearby Tréfeuntec in the Douarnenez Bay. The aircraft was placed on and tethered to a cart towed by a horse. He thus flew higher than his point of departure, a first for heavier-than-air flying machines, reportedly to a height of 100 m (330 ft), for a distance of 200 m (660 ft).

During an unsuccessful second trial in March 1857, the glider was launched from the top of the Tréboul mill and crashed. The plane was damaged beyond repair and Jean Marie Le Bris broke a leg.

== Second glider aircraft: the Albatross ==
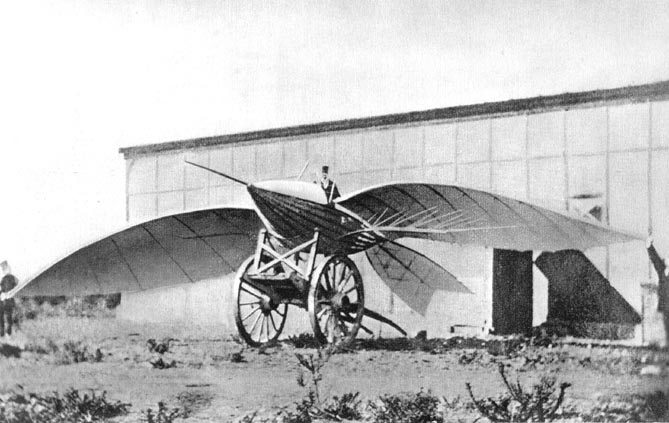
Jean Marie Le Bris and his second flying machine, the Albatross, photographed by Pépin fils, 1868

In 1868, with the support of the Imperial French Navy, he built a second flying machine, called L'Albatros, which was tried in Brest at the artillery polygon of Saint Pierre Quilbignon. According to Gabriel de La Landelle, the aircraft made a few flights, including a 200-m long glide, before being damaged beyond repair after a crash.

Compared to its first glider, it was a very different machine. The wings could not move, but the glider was equipped with a mechanical flight control system that could warp the wings along their entire span. The tail was maneuverable as well. Also, this second plane was structurally different than the first one.

The Albatross became the first aircraft to be photographed, in 1868 by Benjamin Charles Pépin (also known as Pépin fils), photographer based in Siam street, Brest. Two originals of these pictures are preserved by the Musée Carnavalet in Paris (Inventory Number PH1828) and the Musée de l'Air et de l'Espace in Le Bourget, France.

The first well-documented glider was built by George Cayley and flown by an employee in 1853. Also in Great Britain, Stringfellow had built small unmanned gliders in 1848. However Le Bris invented more effective flight controls, which could act on the incidence of wings and which were patented in March 1857.

== Late life ==
In March 1868, Jean Marie Le Bris learned of the death of his son, during his military service, onboard of the frigate La Magicienne sailing nearby Montevideo, Uruguay. Shortly after, he decided to assert his right to retire and get his pension.

During the Franco-Prussian War of 1870, Le Bris volunteered to fight against the Prussian Army. He ended at Camp Conlie and, realizing the fate of the Army of Brittany, got transferred as a franc-tireur. He took part in the combats in Western France: the battle of Le Mans, and the subsequent fights in Sarthe and Mayenne. After the armistice, Le Bris was demobilized and he went back home in Douarnenez.

In 1871, Jean Marie Le Bris was appointed law enforcement officer (agent de police) by the mayor of Douarnenez. On 7 September 1871 Le Bris and fellow policeman Yves Corentin Larhant intervened at a ball to stop a fight between two guests. Le Bris was injured in the process. According to his daughter Julie, he never recovered from this aggression, with his physical health declining over time. Le Bris died in his home of Douarnenez, on 17 February 1872.

== In popular culture ==
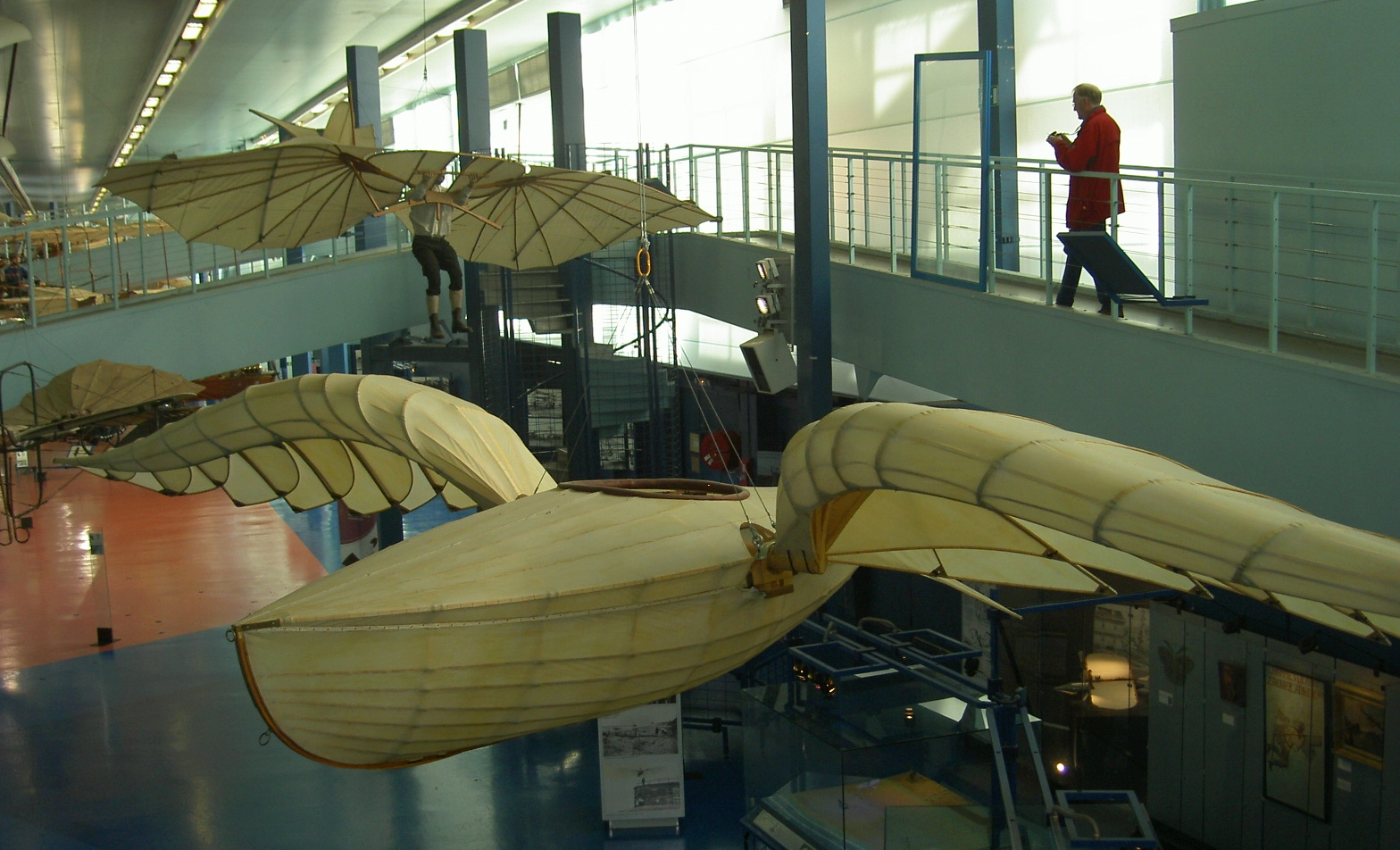
Replica of the first Le Bris' glider at the Musée de l'Air et de l'Espace at Paris-Le Bourget Airport

=== Aviation education and preservation ===
- The Musée de l'Air et de l'Espace in Le Bourget, France hosts a replica of the Winged Boat (Barque ailée) in the Air Pioneers Hall.
- The Wright-Dunbar Interpretive Center, part of the Dayton Aviation Heritage National Historical Park in Dayton, OH, mentions the work of Jean Marie Le Bris in its exhibition on aviation pioneers.

=== Dedications ===
- The school-city (cité scolaire that brings together a collège and a lycée) of Douarnenez and the aviation club of Quimper are named after the aviator.
- A stele was dedicated in the village of Tréfeuntec, Plonévez-Porzay where the Jean Marie Le Bris street ends right before the mouth of the stream Lapic.
- Jean Marie Le Bris is buried in the Douarnenez-Ploaré Cemetery, rue Laennec, Brittany in Section B, Stone No. 2.

=== In arts ===
- Jean Marie Le Bris is one of the main characters of the 1878 novel Les grandes amours by Guillaume Joseph Gabriel de La Landelle. The book was written by the author as a fiction inspired by the life and work of Le Bris.
- The progressive rock band Seven Reizh released two albums inspired by the life of Jean Marie Le Bris: La barque ailée in 2015, and L'Albatros in 2018. They are based on the novel La barque ailée et l’albatros of Gérard Le Dortz.
- The play The Albatross (An Albatroz is the original title in Breton) was created based on Le Bris' story by storyteller Lukaz Nedeleg and accordionist Youen Bodros. It was produced by the performing art group Strollad La Obra in both French and Breton, and was played for the first time in June 2021 in Landerneau, Brittany.

== See also ==
- List of early flying machines
- Timeline of aviation - 19th century
- History of aviation
- Félix du Temple
- Early flying machines
- Wing warping

== Bibliography ==
- Chanute, Octave Progress in Flying Machines. The American Engineer and Railroad Journal. 47 Cedar Street, New York, 1894, 1899
- De La Landelle, Gabriel. Les grandes amours. Dentu, Paris, 1878
- Decoop, Gaston. Un grand précurseur breton 1817/1872 : Jean-Marie Le Bris. Icare, 1968
- Gibbs-Smith, C.H. Aviation: An Historical Survey. London, NMSI, 2008. ISBN 1 900747 52 9
- Opdycke, Leonard E. French Aeroplanes Before the Great War Atglen, PA: Schiffer, 1999. ISBN 0 7643 0752 5
- Peslin, Charles-Yves. Jean Marie Le Bris. Marin breton précurseur de l'aviation. Journal Les Ailes, Société d'éditions aéronautiques. Paris, 1944
- Lacan, Guy et al. Jean-Marie Le Bris: précurseur de l'aéronautique. Icare No. 192. Roissy-en-France, 2005. ISSN 0018-8786
