= Alexis-Jean-Pierre Paucton =

French mathematician

Alexis-Jean-Pierre Paucton (1736–1798) was a French mathematician.
