= Edwards Rhomboidal =

- The Edwards Rhomboidal at Brooklands

General information
- Type: Experimental aircraft
- National origin: United Kingdom
- Designer: Arthur Henry Edwards
- Number built: 1

History
- Introduction date: 1911

The Edwards Rhomboidal was an early British aircraft of extremely unorthodox configuration designed by Arthur Henry Edwards.

== Design and development ==
The Edwards Rhomboidal was an annular wing biplane with identical upper and lower surfaces consisting of four surfaces in a diamond arrangement, the aft wings being of three times the chord of the forward wings. It had been arrived at as a result of successful experiments with a rubber-driven model monoplane. The main structure of the aircraft was formed by a pair of triangular section wire-braced trusses arranged one above another, connected by five sets of paired struts. Each girder bore a pair of substantial flexibly mounted struts extending outwards, the wings being tensioned between the ends of the longitudinal girders and the outer ends of the struts by means of cables which formed the wing leading edges. The trailing edges were under less tension, the intention being that the wings would automatically deform to spread flight loads. They had no internal spars, being stiffened by ribs aligned with the direction of flight sewn into pockets in the single thickness of fabric. A rectangular elevator was mounted on the rearmost connecting struts, and a small rudder was mounted above the upper wing. There was no provision for lateral control. It was powered by a 50 hp (37 kW) Humber water-cooled engine using chains to drive a pair of tractor propellers between the wings, with the pilot sitting behind the engine. The undercarriage consisted of a pair of skids each bearing a pair of wheels, supplemented by a castoring nosewheel and a tailskid.

It was tested at Brooklands during early 1911, but there is no record of it having left the ground.

== Specifications ==
Data from Lewis 1962, p.245.

General characteristics

- Crew: 1
- Length: 48 ft 0 in (14.63 m)
- Wingspan: 38 ft 0 in (11.58 m)
- Wing area: 1,200 sq ft (110 m^{2})
- Empty weight: 1,600 lb (726 kg)
- Powerplant: 1 × Humber inline water cooled
- Propellers: 2-bladed
