= Timeline of aviation in the 19th century =

Timeline
of aviation
pre-18th century
18th century
19th century
20th century
21st century begins

This is a list of aviation-related events during the 19th century (1 January 1801 – 31 December 1900):

== 1800–1859 ==
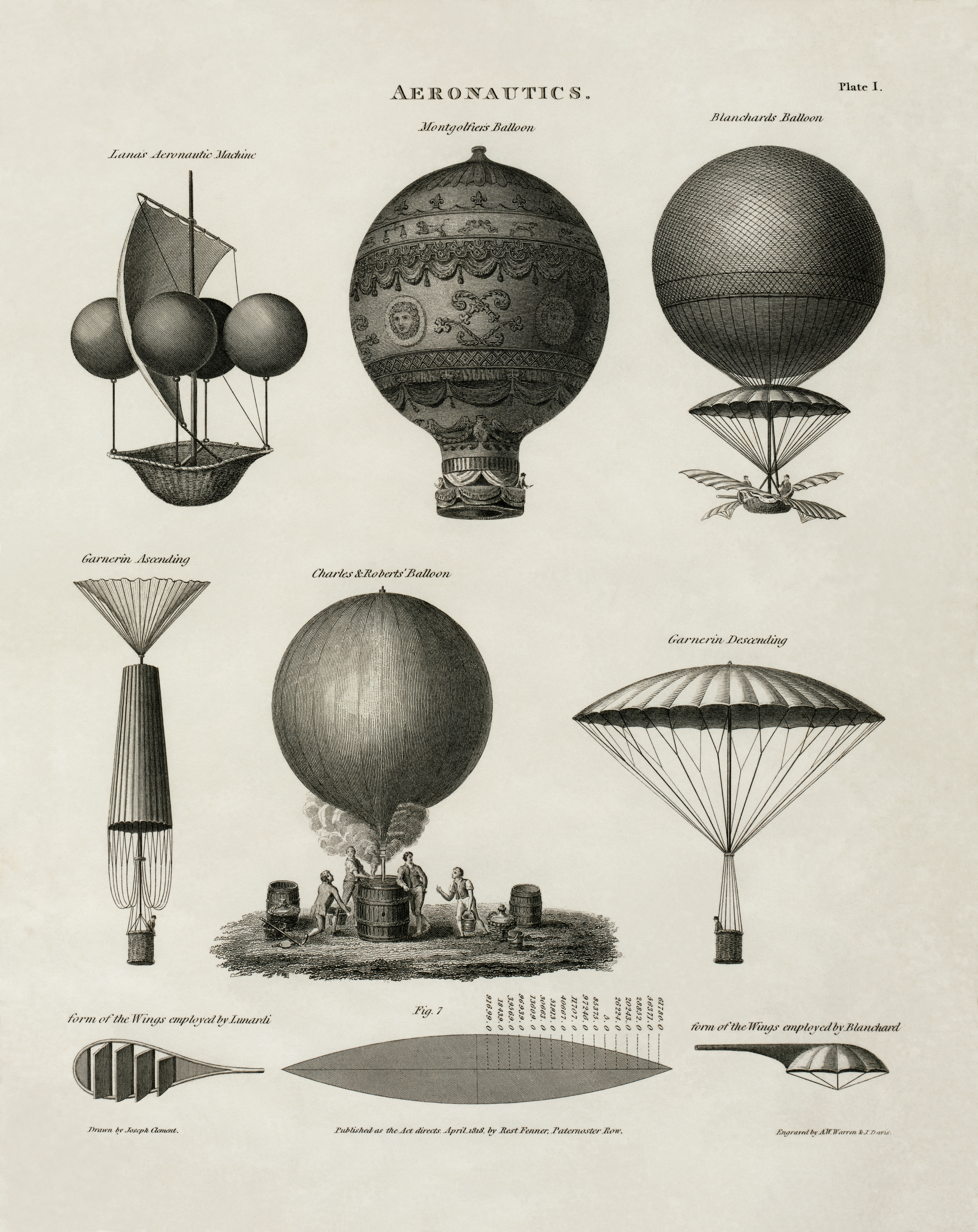
An 1818 technical illustration shows early balloon designs.

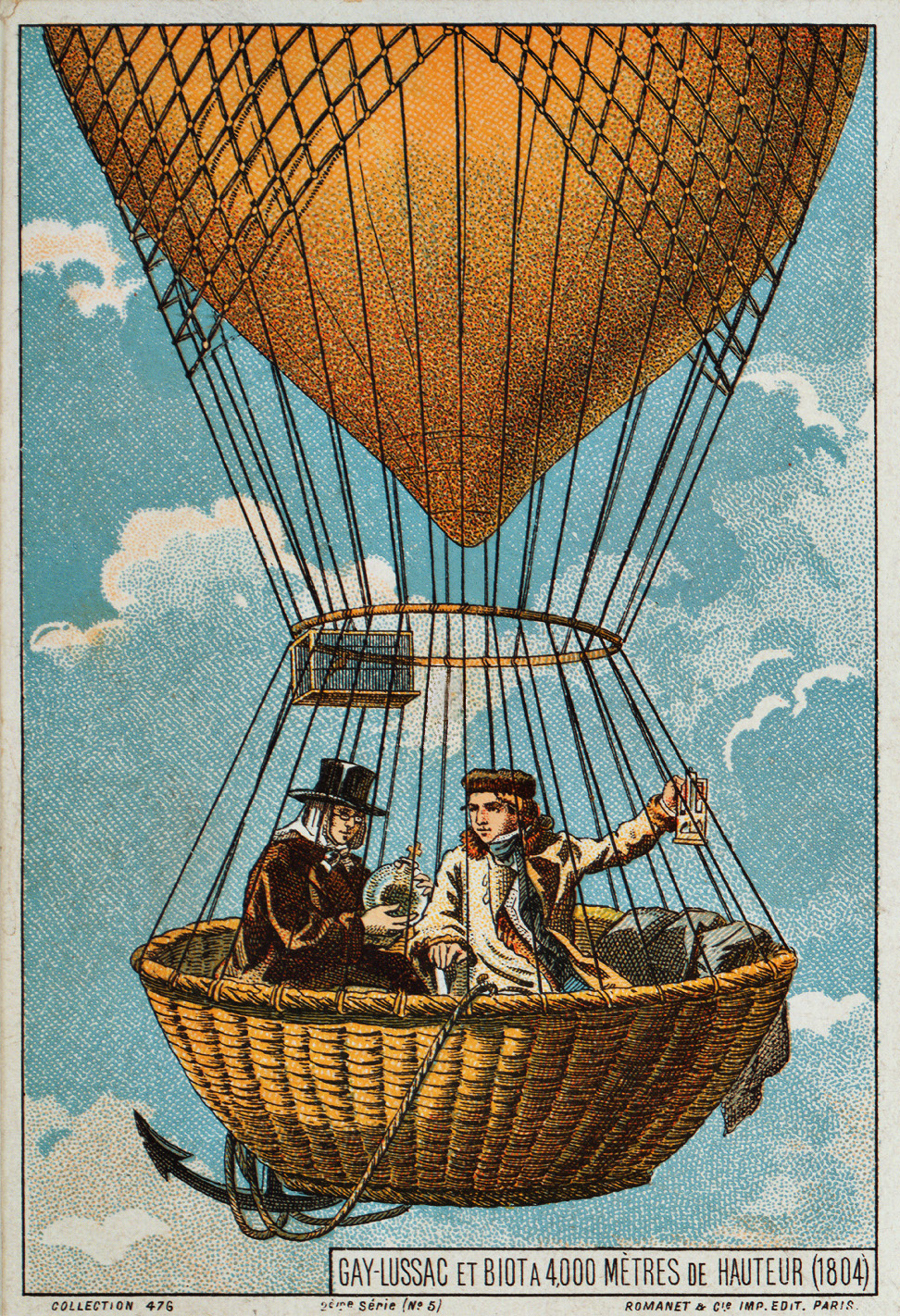
A late 19th-century illustration of Gay-Lussac and Biot ascending to 4,000 m (13,000 ft) in a hot-air balloon in 1804.

- 1802
  - 5 July – André-Jacques Garnerin and Edward Hawke Locker make a 17-mile (27 km) balloon flight from Lord's Cricket Ground in St John's Wood to Chingford in just over 15 minutes.
  - 2 December – A manned illuminated balloon is launched from the front of Notre Dame de Paris during the Coronation of Napoleon I.
- 1803
  - British Rear Admiral Charles Knowles proposes to the Admiralty that the Royal Navy loft an observation balloon from a ship in order to reconnoitre French preparations for the invasion of Britain in Brest. The proposal is ignored.
  - 18 July – Etienne Gaspar Robertson and his copilot Lhoest ascend from Hamburg, Germany, to an altitude of around 7,300 m (24,000 ft) in a balloon.
  - 3–4 October – André-Jacques Garnerin covers a distance of 395 km (245 mi) from Paris to Clausen, Germany.
  - 7–8 October – Francesco Zambeccari and Pasquale Andreoli make a balloon flight which crashes into the Adriatic Sea.
- 1804
  - Sir George Cayley builds a model glider with a main wing and separate, adjustable vertical and horizontal tail surfaces.
  - August/September – The scientists Joseph Louis Gay-Lussac and Jean Baptiste Biot use a balloon to conduct experiments on the Earth's magnetic field and the composition of the upper atmosphere.
  - 23 August – Francesco Zambeccari and Pasquale Andreoli make a second balloon flight which crashes into the Adriatic Sea.
- 1806
  - Lord Cochrane flies kites from the Royal Navy 32-gun frigate HMS Pallas to spread propaganda leaflets along the coast of France. It is the first use of an aerial device in European maritime warfare.
- 1807
  - Jakob Degen, a clockmaker from Vienna, experiments with an ornithopter with flap-valve wings.
- 1809
  - Degen propels a hydrogen-filled balloon by flapping large ornithopter-style wings.
  - September – Sir George Cayley publishes the first part of his seminal paper On Aerial Navigation, setting out for the first time the scientific principles of heavier-than-air flight.
- 1810
  - September – Frenchwoman Sophie Blanchard makes a flight starting from Frankfurt, making her the first woman to fly in a balloon in Germany.
  - Chemist Johann Gottfried Reichard makes his first flight in a self-constructed gas balloon from Berlin, making him the second person to fly in a gas balloon in Germany.
- 1811
  - 16 April – Wilhelmine Reichard makes her first solo flight, starting in Berlin, making her the first native German woman to fly in a balloon.
  - 31 May – Albrecht Berblinger crashes a hang glider (possibly a copy of Degen's) into the Danube. A reproduction built according to the design drawing in 1986 is capable of flight.

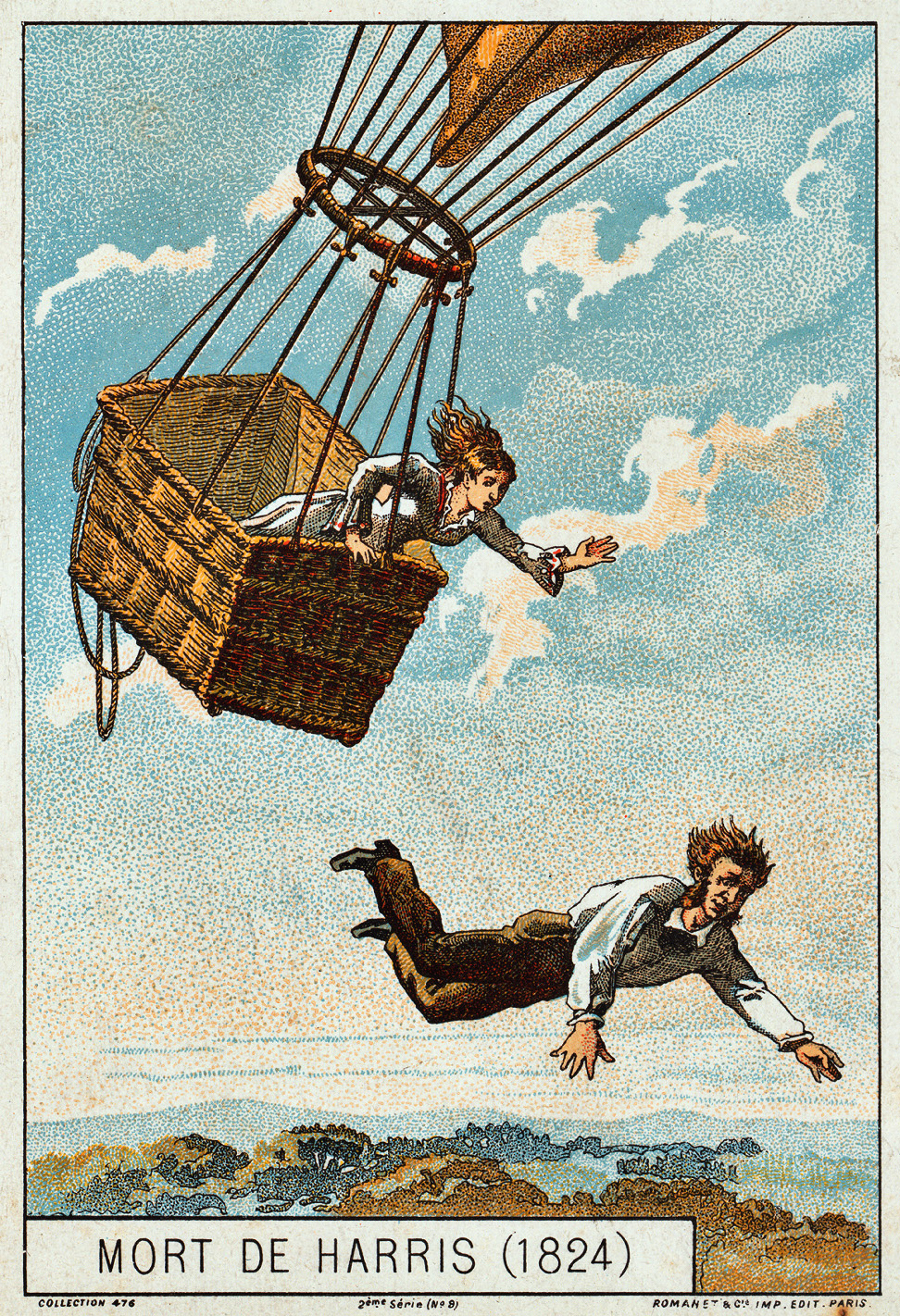
Harris jumps from his balloon to save his fiancée. Illustration from the late 19th Century.

- 1812
  - 21 September – Francesco Zambeccari dies when his balloon catches fire on landing.
- 1819
  - 6 July – Sophie Blanchard launches fireworks from her balloon in flight during an exhibition at the Tivoli Gardens in Paris. The fireworks ignite the gas in the balloon, which crashes on the roof of a house. She falls to her death, becoming the first woman to die in an aviation accident.
- 1824
  - 25 May – Englishman Thomas Harris dies when his balloon crashes near Carshalton. His female passenger survives. The exact cause is not determined but is apparently due to a valve Harris has designed to release gas from the balloon becoming stuck open. Despite dropping all ballast Harris is unable to stop a precipitous plunge.
- 1836
  - 7–8 November – Flight of a coal gas balloon (named The Great Balloon of Nassau) by Charles Green covering 722 km (449 mi) from London to Weilburg, Germany, in 18 hours with passengers Robert Hollond and Thomas Monck Mason. It is the first overnight balloon flight, and it sets a world ballooning distance record that will stand until 1907 in aviation#1907.
- 1837
  - Robert Cocking jumps from a balloon piloted by Charles Green at a height of 2,000 m (6,600 ft) to demonstrate a parachute of his own design, and is killed in the attempt.
- 1838
  - 4 September – Charles Green, George Rush, and Edward Spencer ascend to an altitude of 19,335 feet (5,893 meters) over England in the Great Balloon of Nassau before landing at Thaxted.
  - 10 September – Green and Rush ascend to a world record altitude of 27,146 feet (8,274 meters) over England in the Great Balloon of Nassau, reaching speeds of 80 to 100 mph (130 to 160 km/h) during the flight.
- 1839
  - The American John Wise introduces the ripping panel which is still used today. The panel solved the problem of the balloon dragging along the ground at landing and needing to be stopped with the help of anchors.
  - Charles Green and the astronomer Spencer Rush ascend to 7,900 m (25,900 ft) in a free balloon.

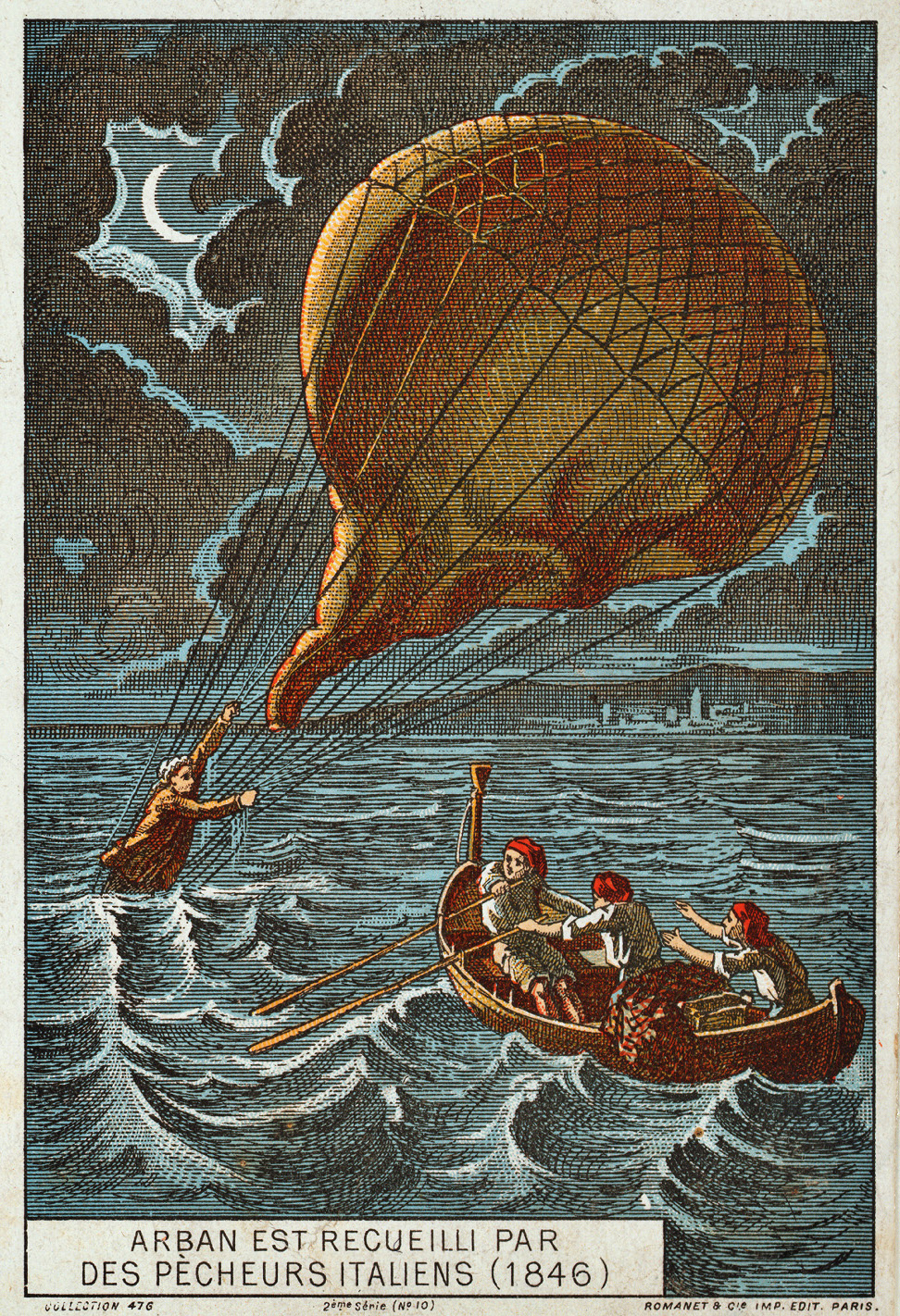
Francisque Arban is rescued by Italian fishermen, 1846. Illustration from the late 19th century.

- 1840
  - Louis Anslem Lauriat makes the first manned flight in Canada, at Saint John, New Brunswick, in his balloon Star of the East.
- 1842
  - November – English engineer William Samuel Henson makes the first complete drawing of a power-driven aeroplane with steam-engine drive. The patent follows the works of Cayley. The English House of Commons rejects the motion for the formation of an "Aerial Transport Company" with great laughter.
- 1843
  - William Samuel Henson and John Stringfellow file articles of incorporation for the world's first air transport company, the Aerial Transit Company
- 1845
  - William Samuel Henson and John Stringfellow build a steam-powered model aircraft, with a wingspan of 10 ft (3.0 m).
- 1846
  - French balloonist Francisque Arban makes his twelfth flight from Rome in April, and is rescued from the sea after a flight from Trieste later in the year.
- 1848
  - John Stringfellow flies a powered monoplane model a few dozen feet in a powered glide at an exhibition at Cremorne Gardens in London.
- 1849
  - 12–25 July – While blockading Venice, the Austrians launch unmanned incendiary balloons equipped with explosive charges from land and as well as from the steamship SMS Vulcano in an attempt to bombard Venice. Although the experiment is mostly unsuccessful, it is both the first use of balloons for bombardment and the first time a warship makes offensive use of an aerial device.
  - 2–3 September – French balloonist Francisque Arban makes the first (and until 1924 only) balloon flight over the Alps, flying a hydrogen balloon from Marseille to Turin.
  - 7 October – Francisque Arban takes off from Barcelona, but his balloon is blown over the Mediterranean Sea and is lost.
  - Sir George Cayley launches a 10-year-old boy in a small glider being towed by a team of people running down a hill. This is the first known flight by a person in a heavier-than-air machine.
- 1852
  - 24 September – French engineer Henri Giffard flies 27 km (17 mi) from the Paris Hippodrome to Trappes in a steam-powered dirigible, reaching a speed of about 10 km/h (6.2 mph).
- 1853
  - Late June or early July – Sir George Cayley's coachman successfully flies a glider, designed by his employer, some proportion of the distance across Brompton Dale in Yorkshire, becoming the world's first adult aeroplane pilot. Unimpressed with this honour, the coachman promptly resigns his employment.
- 1855
  - First use of the word "aeroplane", in a paper by Joseph Pline.
- 1856
  - December – French Captain Jean Marie Le Bris is towed into the air in his Artificial Albatross glider, flying 600 ft (180 m).
- 1857
  - Félix Du Temple flies clockwork and steam-powered model aircraft, the first sustained powered flights by heavier-than-air machines.
  - French brothers du Temple de la Croix apply after successful attempts with models for a patent for a power-driven aeroplane.
- 1858
  - John Wise and three companions complete a Montgolfière flight over a distance of 802 miles (1,291 km) from St. Louis to Henderson
  - French airman Nadar takes the first aerial photographs.

== 1860s ==
- 1860
  - 13 October – Ascending in Samuel Archer King's balloon The Queen of the Air, James Wallace Black takes eight photographs of Boston from an altitude of 1,200 ft (370 m). The single clear print is the first successful aerial photograph in the United States and the first clear aerial photograph of a city ever taken anywhere.
- 1861
  - The first use of observation balloons in naval warfare takes place during the American Civil War (1861–1865).
  - The United States Navy barge George Washington Parke Custis becomes the first ship configured to conduct air operations, transporting and towing observation balloons along the Potomac River. She continues these operations into early 1862.
  - 16 June – Floating 500 ft (150 m) above the National Mall in Washington, D.C., the balloon Enterprise with a telegraph key wired directly to the White House, Thaddeus Lowe sends a telegram to President Abraham Lincoln to demonstrate the value of balloons in military reconnaissance. It is the first telegram to be sent from the air. The Union Army Balloon Corps will be formed under Lowe's command, for observation and artillery direction, and balloons will see major use in the American Civil War over the next four years.
  - 3 August – The United States Army steamship Fanny becomes the first ship to loft a captive manned balloon when a civilian aeronaut, John La Mountain, ascends from her deck to observe Confederate military positions at Hampton Roads, Virginia. He ascends again a few days later either from Fanny or a ship named Adriatic.
- 1862
  - With the permission of the British War Office, British Army Captain F. Beaumont and Lieutenant George Grover perform observation balloon trials at Aldershot, assisted by the civilian aeronaut Henry Tracey Coxwell. It is the first balloon experiment in the British armed forces, although the first official experimentation will not occur until 1878.
  - Late March – Civilian aeronaut John H. Steiner takes United States Navy officers aloft in an observation balloon from the deck of a flatboat on the Mississippi River so that they can direct the fire of U.S. Navy mortar boats against the Confederate-held Island Number Ten It will be the last aerial guidance of naval gunfire anywhere in the world until 1904.
  - March–May – The George Washington Parke Custis transports and tows observation balloons along the York River in Virginia during the Peninsula Campaign.
  - April – John B. Starkweather ascends several times in a balloon from the deck of the Union paddle steamer May Flower to observe Confederate positions at Port Royal, South Carolina.
  - June – The Confederate States Navy chooses the steamer CSS Teaser to embark a balloon for use in observation of Union Army positions along the James River in Virginia.
  - 1–3 July – The Confederate States Navy steamer Teaser operates a coal-gas silk observation balloon to reconnoitre Union Army positions along the James River in Virginia, the only use of a balloon by the Confederate States Navy. Her capture on 4 July by the steamer USS Maratanza ends Confederate naval balloon operations.
  - 5 September – Aeronaut Henry Tracey Coxwell and English physicist James Glaisher officially reach a height of 29,527 ft (9,000 m) in a coal gas balloon according to their balloon's barometer, although later estimates place the maximum altitude they attained at between 35,000 and 37,000 feet (10,668 and 11,278 meters). The two men nearly die of hypoxia during the flight, Glaisher falling unconscious and Coxwell losing all feeling in his hands.
- 1863
  - The Union Army Balloon Corps is disbanded early in the year.
  - Dirigible airship flown by Solomon Andrews over Perth Amboy, New Jersey.
  - John H. Steiner takes Ferdinand von Zeppelin, an officer from the Army of Württemberg assigned to the Union Army as an observer, aloft in a balloon. Zeppelin later will credit this ascent as his inspiration to create the rigid airship, which he first flies in 1900.
- 1864
  - Outbreak of the Paraguayan War between the Alliance of Argentina, Brazil and Uruguay against Paraguay. The Alliance forces made much use of balloon reconnaissance over the next six years.
  - English philosopher-scientist Matthew Piers Watt Boulton of the UK writes his short paper, On Aerial Locomotion, detailing several inventions, including that of the aileron almost as an afterthought (he later patents them in 1868). Boulton's inspiration has been attributed to French Count Ferdinand Charles Honore Phillipe d'Esterno, whose detailed analysis of flapping and soaring bird flight, Du Vol des Oiseaux (On the flight of birds) was published as a pamphlet in 1864.
- 1865
  - Solomon Andrews flies a dirigible twice over New York City.
  - German experimenter Paul Haenlein takes out a patent for the "Earliest Known Airship With a Semi-rigid Frame," envisioned to have a coal-gas-burning engine which draws its fuel from the craft's envelope, which is filled with coal gas. He later will construct the craft in Germany.
  - Jules Verne describes in his novel The Journey to the Moon the launch of a rocket from Florida, from which many years later American space flights actually will start.
  - The Frenchman Le Comte Ferdinand Charles Honore Phillipe d'Esterno writes in his book About the Flight of Birds, "Gliding seems to be characteristic for heavy birds; there are no odds which are stacked against that humans can not do the same at fair wind." He had earlier published the 1864 pamphlet Du Vol des Oiseaux (On the flight of birds).
  - French artist and farmer Louis Pierre Mouillard makes a tentative gliding flight. After years of studies of bird flight he publishes his book L'Empire de l'Air in 1881. He thinks that imitation of gliding and soaring flight of birds is possible, but not the imitation of the flapping of wings.
  - 20 September – Jacob Brodbeck, in his coil-spring-driven airship, flies 100 feet before crashing in a field near Luckenbach, Texas.
- 1866
  - First South American military balloon reconnaissance ascent. On 6 July, Lieutenant Colonel Roberto A. Chodasiewicz, an Argentine Army military engineer, makes the first South American military observation ascent, manning a Brazilian Army's captive ballon over Paraguayan troops, during the Paraguayan War.
  - Foundation (12 January in London) of the Aeronautical Society of Great Britain later to become the Royal Aeronautical Society, the world's oldest society devoted to all aspects of aeronautics and astronautics.
  - Francis Herbert Wenham, British, presents his paper on "Aerial Locomotion" to the RAeS. Patented superposed wing design (biplane, multiplane).
  - Jan Wnęk claims gliding flights (1866–1869) from the Odporyszów church tower. Kraków Museum of Ethnography, the source of claims of documentary evidence, refuse to allow independent researchers access to these.
  - First exhibition of aviation in London's Crystal Palace.
- 1868
  - British inventor Matthew Piers Watt Boulton patents the aileron in its modern form.
- 1869
  - 4 July – Frederick Marriott makes the first successful flight of an unmanned powered airship in the United States at San Francisco, a small scale dirigible called the Avitor Hermes, Jr..

== 1870–1889 ==
- 1870
  - Balloons are used by the French to transport letters and passengers out of besieged Paris during the Franco-Prussian War. Between September 1870 and January 1871, 66 flights – of which 58 land safely – carry 110 passengers and up to three million letters out of Paris, as well as 500 carrier pigeons to deliver messages back to Paris. One balloon accidentally sets a world distance record by ending up off the coast of Norway.
- 1871
  - The Englishmen Wenham and Browning construct the first wind tunnel and conduct airflow experiments.
  - Alphonse Pénaud flies his Planophore, a small rubber-powered model which is designed to have automatic pitch and roll stability.
- 1872
  - 2 February – French naval architect Henri Dupuy de Lôme achieves 9 to 11 km/h (5.6 to 6.8 mph) with his airship driven by a propeller turned by eight men.
  - 13 December – The German experimenter Paul Haenlein tests the first airship with an internal combustion engine in Brünn, Austria-Hungary, achieving 19 km/h (12 mph); the engine burns coal gas drawn from its balloon. The tests are stopped because of a shortage of money.
- 1873
  - The New York Daily Graphic sponsors the first attempt in history to fly across the Atlantic Ocean, using a 400,000-cubic-foot (11,000 m^{3}) balloon carrying a lifeboat. The attempt is abandoned when the balloon rips and collapses during inflation.
- 1874
  - 20 September – Felix and Louis du Temple de la Croix build a piloted steam-powered monoplane which achieves a short hop after gaining speed by rolling down a ramp.
- 1875
  - Englishman Thomas Moy tests a tethered aeroplane with a wing span of 4 metres (13 feet) powered by a steam engine.
  - German experimenter Paul Haenlein improves his airship by providing it with a car suspended below its framework to accommodate the crew and engine. This will become a standard practice in the design of later dirigibles.
  - 15 April – In the balloon Zénith, the French Navy officer Théodore Sivel, the French journalist Joseph Crocé-Spinelli, and the French scientist and editor Gaston Tissandier ascend to a record altitude of 8,600 metres (28,200 feet). Hypoxia kills Sivel and Crocé-Spinelli during the flight and leaves Tissandier deaf.
- 1876
  - Alphonse Pénaud and Paul Gauchot apply for a patent for a power-driven aeroplane with a retractable undercarriage, wings with dihedral and joystick control.

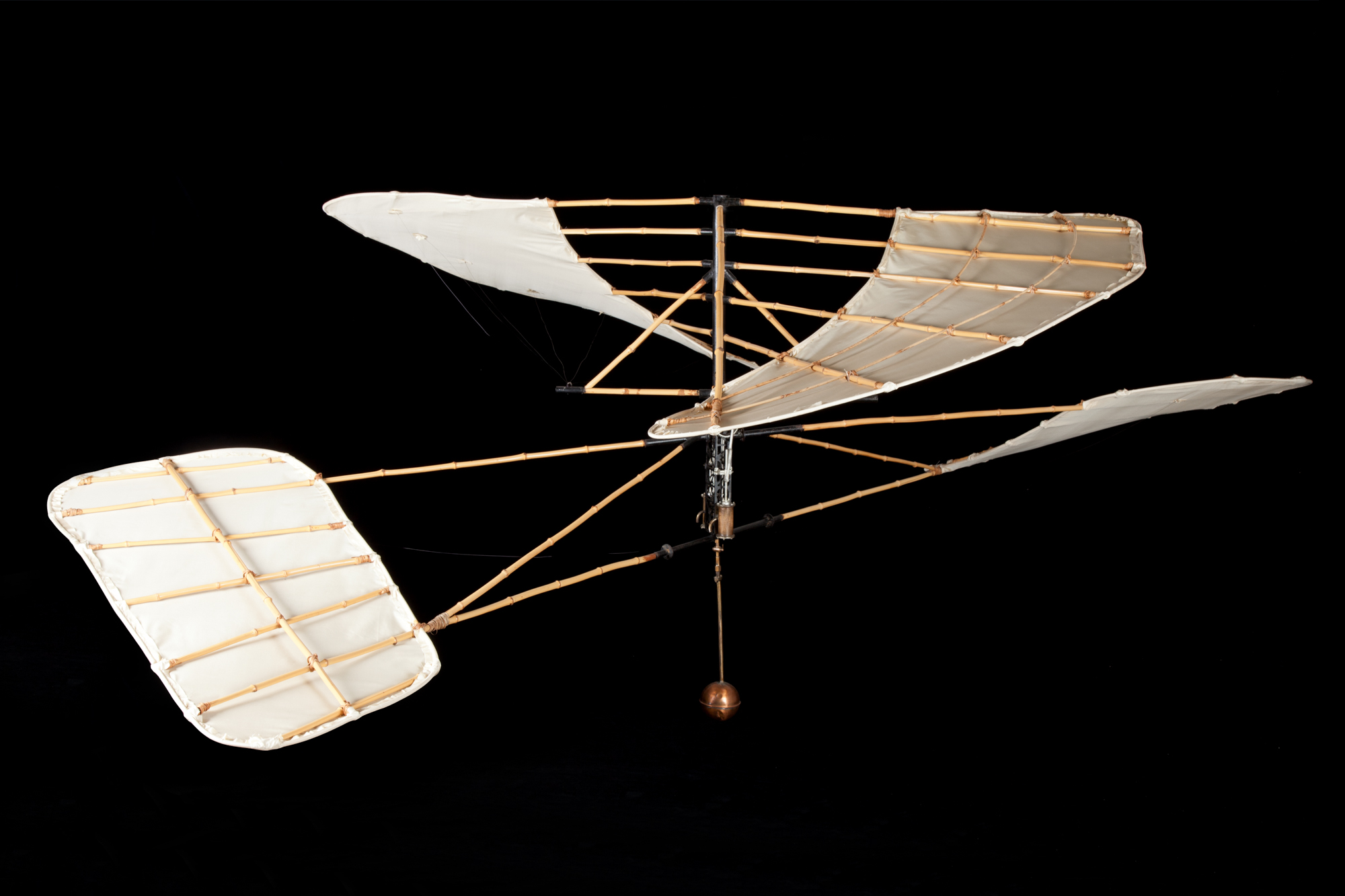
Experimental helicopter by Enrico Forlanini (1877) (Museo nazionale della scienza e della tecnologia Leonardo da Vinci, Milan)

- 1877
  - First flight of a steam-driven model helicopter built by Enrico Forlanini.
  - Imperial Japanese Army flying experience begins with the use of balloons.
- 1878
  - Charles F. Ritchel publicly demonstrates of his hand-powered, one-man rigid airship, and eventually sells five of them.
  - At the Balloon Equipment Store at the Royal Arsenal, Woolwich, British Army Captain James Templer conducts the British Army's first official experiments with an observation balloon. It is considered the birth of British military aviation.
- 1879
  - The British Army gains its first balloon, the Pioneer.
  - Frenchman Victor Tatin builds a power-driven model aeroplane with airscrews and a compressed air motor, successfully flying it off the ground.
  - American scientist Edmund Clarence Stedman proposes a rigid airship inspired by the anatomy of a fish, with a framework of steel, brass, or copper tubing and a tractor propeller mounted on the front of the envelope, later changed to an engine with two propellers suspended beneath the framework. The airship never is built, but Stedman's design foreshadows that of the Zeppelins of World War I.
  - Biot makes short hops in the Biot-Massia glider.
- 1880
  - The Russian naval officer Alexander Fjodorowitsch Mozhaiski patents a steam-powered aircraft.
  - Friedrich Wölfert and Ernst Baumgarten attempt to fly a powered dirigible in free flight, but crash.
  - Balloons are used in British military manoeuvres for the first time at Aldershot.
  - Spyridon Psaroudakis, a Greek mathematician/physicist and engineer who had published a theoretical and experimental study on powered flight of heavier-than-air objects, reportedly tested a self made heavier-than-air flying machine from a hill on the island of Crete. His device is destroyed during attempts.
- 1882
  - 4 July – The first balloon flight in New Mexico is made by Park Van Tassel.
- 1883
  - M.A. Goupil proposes a steam-powered monoplane with tractor propeller. His full-size test rig lifts itself and two men in a light breeze, but the design is never built.
  - The first electric-powered flight is made by Gaston Tissandier who fits a Siemens electric motor to a dirigible. Airships with electric engines (Tissandier brothers, Renard and Krebs).
  - Wölfert unsuccessfully tests a balloon powered by a hand-cranked propeller
  - The Berlin-based "German Society for Promoting Aviation" publishes a magazine, the "Zeitschrift für Luftschiffahrt" (Magazine of Aviation).

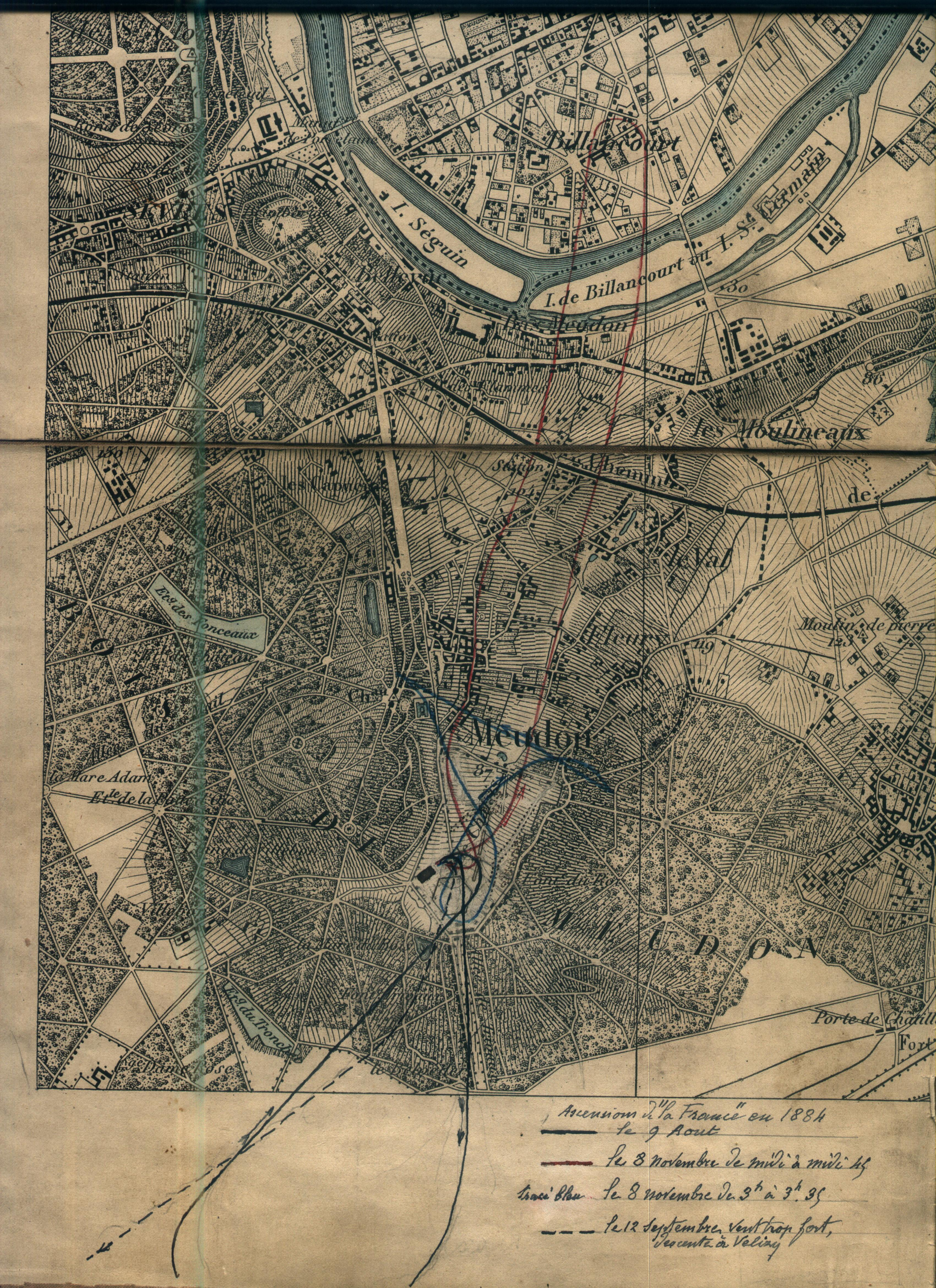
The 1884 Krebs & Renard first fully controllable free-flights with the LA FRANCE electric dirigible near Paris (Krebs arch.)

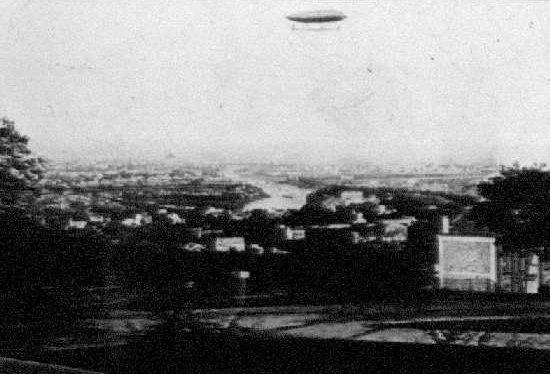
The astronomer Jules Janssen took this photo of La France dirigible of the French officers Charles Renard and Arthur Krebs from his Meudon astrophysic observatory in 1885.

- 1884
  - 9 August – The first fully controllable free-flight is made in the French Army dirigible La France by Charles Renard and Arthur Krebs. The flight covers 8 km (5.0 mi) in 23 minutes. It was the first flight to return to the starting point.
  - Mozhaiski finishes his monoplane (span 14 m, or 46 ft). It makes a short flight, taking off after running down a launching ramp.
  - John J. Montgomery makes first controlled heavier-than-air unpowered flight in America.
  - The British Army deploys observation balloons in combat for the first time, when it takes balloons subordinated to the Royal Engineers along on the Bechuanaland Expedition in South Africa.
  - The Imperial Russian Army adopts the balloon for military service.
  - Englishman Horatio Phillipps has a patent issued for curved aerofoil sections.
  - Goupil publishes his book on La Locomotion Aérienne.
- 1885
  - The Prussian Airship Arm (Preussische Luftschiffer Abteilung) becomes a permanent unit of the army.
  - The British Army deploys observation balloons in Sudan to take part in the expedition to Suakin during the Mahdist War.
  - Frenchmen Hervé and Alluard achieve a hot air balloon flight of over 24 hours.
  - John J. Montgomery experiments with a second glider in California.
- 1886
  - John J. Montgomery conducts studies on the flow of water and air over angles surfaces and experiments with a third glider in California.
- 1887
  - 30 January – Thomas Scott Baldwin makes the first parachute jump in the western United States at San Francisco from a tethered balloon owned by Park Van Tassel and using a parachute co-invented with Park Van Tassel.
- 1888
  - Wölfert flies a petrol powered dirigible at Seelburg, the first use of a petrol-fuelled engine for aviation purposes. The engine was built by Gottlieb Daimler.
  - 4 July – Clara Van Tassel makes the first parachute jump by a woman in the western United States at Los Angeles from a balloon operated by her husband Park Van Tassel.
- 1889
  - Percival G. Spencer makes a successful parachute jump from a balloon at Drumcondra, Ireland
  - Otto Lilienthal publishes in his book Der Vogelflug als Grundlage der Fliegekunst (Bird Flight as the Basis for the Art of Aviation) measurements on wings, so called polar diagrams, which are the concept of description of artificial wings even today. The book gives a reference for the advantages of the arched wing.
  - Pichancourt develops a mechanical bird which aimed to imitate the motion of a bird's wings in flight.
  - Lawrence Hargrave, a British immigrant to Australia, constructs a rotary engine driven by compressed air.
  - A British Army observation balloon section takes part in the Army Manoeuvres at Aldershot.
  - 24 September – American balloonist and parachutist Charles Leroux makes his 239th jump, dropping from a seat under a balloon over Reval, Estland Governorate, in the Russian Empire. Winds carry him out over Tallinn Bay, where he drowns after landing 2 kilometres (1.2 mi; 1.1 nmi) offshore.

== 1890–1900 ==
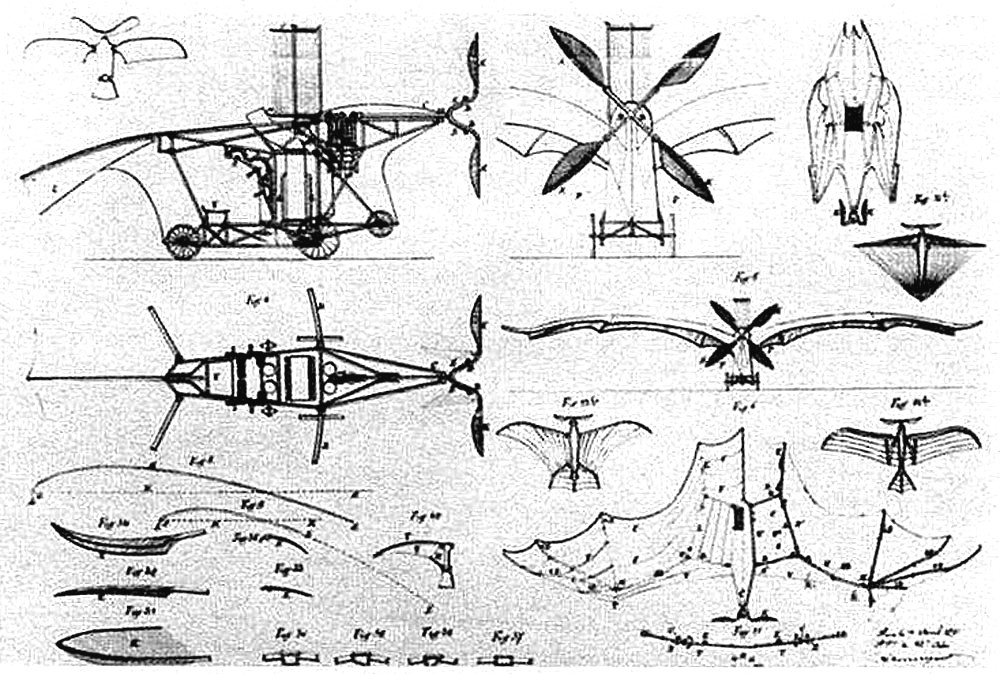
Patent drawing of Ader's Eole

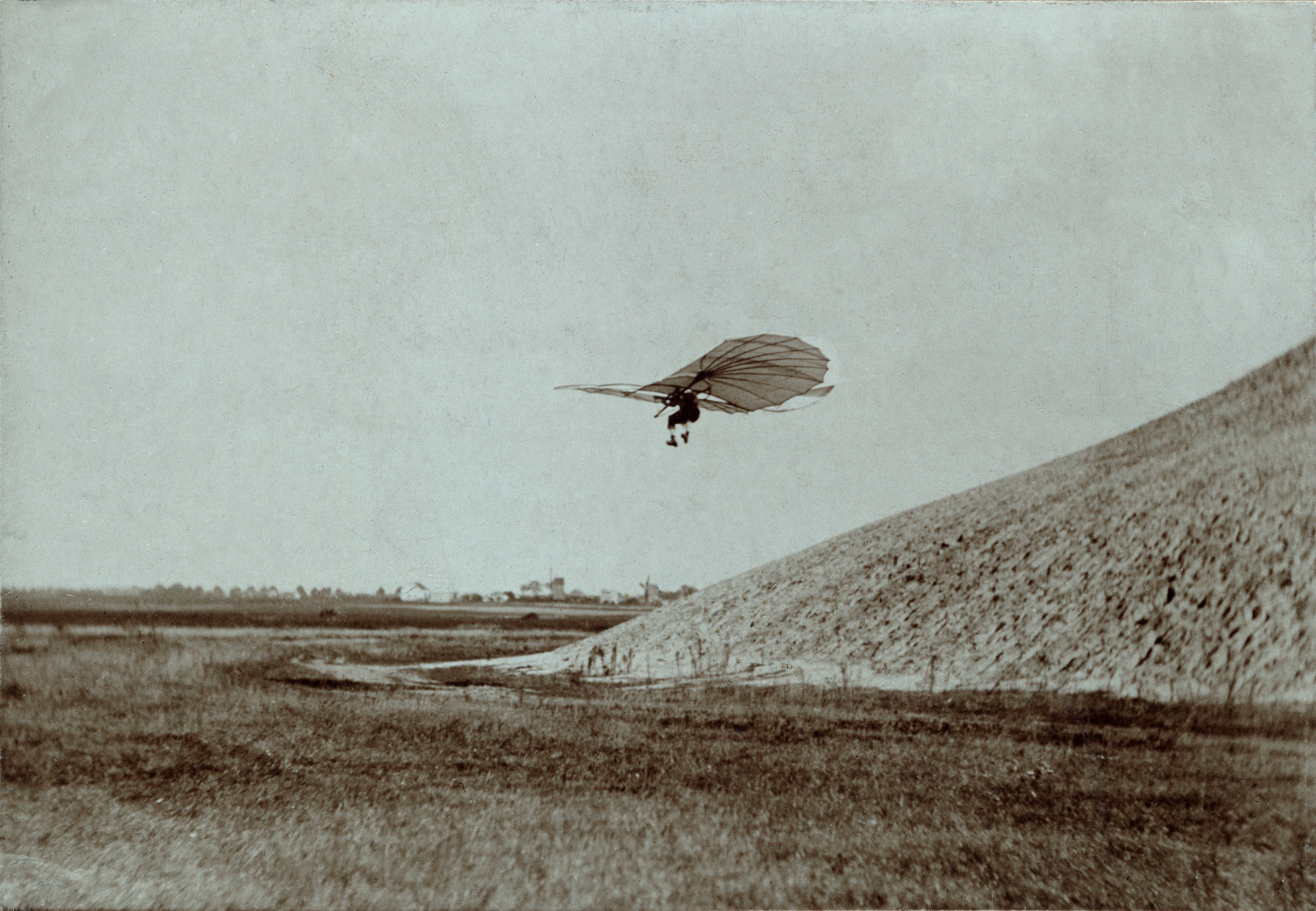
Otto Lilienthal in flight, ca. 1895

- 1890
  - The British Army establishes a Balloon Section of the Royal Engineers, commanded by Lieutenant H. B. Jones. A balloon factory and a ballooning school support the new section.
  - 9 October – The first brief flight of Clément Ader's steam-powered fixed-wing aircraft Eole takes place in Satory, France. It flies uncontrolled approximately 50 metres (160 feet) at a height of 20 cm (7.9 in) before crashing, but it is the first take-off of a powered airplane solely under its own power.
- 1891
  - Otto Lilienthal flies about 25 m (82 ft) in his Derwitzer Glider.
  - Clément Ader makes a second flight in Eole, an uncontrolled 100-meter (330-foot) hop that ends in a crash. Ader later will experiment with an even less successful twin-engined steam-powered aircraft before giving up his aircraft experiments.
  - 29 April – Chuhachi Ninomiya flies the first model airplane in Japan, a rubber-band-powered monoplane with a four-bladed pusher propeller and three-wheeled landing gear. It makes flights of 3 and 10 meters (9.8 and 32.8 ft). The next day it flies 36 metres (118 feet).
- 1892
  - February – The first contract is awarded for the construction of a military airplane: Clément Ader is contracted by the French War Ministry to build a two-seater aircraft to be used as a bomber, capable of lifting a 75-kilogram (165-pound) bombload.
  - August – Clément Ader later claims to have made an uncontrolled flight of 200 metres (660 feet) in the Avion II (also referred to as the Zephyr or Éole II) at a field in Satory in this month.
  - Otto Lilienthal flies over 82 metres (90 yards) in his Südende-Glider.
  - Austria-Hungary's army gains a permanent air corps, the Kaiserlich und Königliche Militäraeronautische Anstalt ("Imperial and Royal Military Aeronautical Group")
- 1893
  - Otto Lilienthal flies about 250 m (820 ft) in his Maihöhe-Rhinow-Glider.
  - Lawrence Hargrave demonstrates a human-carrying glider in Australia at an aeronautical congress in Sydney. It is based on the box kite, an invention of Hargrave's. It becomes an example for several scientific kites and aeroplane constructions.
  - British Army Captain Baden Baden-Powell begins experiments with man-lifting kites.
  - Horatio Phillips builds a steam-powered test rig at Harrow. A "venetian blind" style multiplane with a stack of wings each with a span of 5.8 metres (19 ft) and a chord of only 4 cm (1.5 in). Tethered to the centre of a circular track, its rear wheels rose 60–90 cm (2.0–3.0 ft) while front wheels remained on ground.
- 1894
  - Czeslaw Tanski successfully flies powered models in Poland and begins work on full-size gliders.
  - Railway engineer Octave Chanute publishes Progress in Flying Machines, describing the research completed so far into flight. Chanute's book, a summary of many articles published in the "American Engineer and Railroad Journal", is a comprehensive account on the stage of development worldwide on the way to the aeroplane.
  - Otto Lilienthal's Normal soaring apparatus is the first serial production of a glider. Using different aircraft constructions he covers distances of up to 250 metres (820 ft).
  - The British Army forms a kiting section for the operation of man-lifting kites within the Royal Engineers.
  - 31 July – Hiram Maxim launches an enormous biplane test rig with a wingspan of 32 m (105 ft) propelled by two steam engines. It lifts off and engages the restraining rails, which prevent it from leaving the track.
  - November – Lawrence Hargrave demonstrates stable flight with a tethered box kite.
  - 4 December – German meteorologist and Aerologist Arthur Berson ascends to 9,155 metres (30,036 feet) in a balloon, setting a new world altitude record for human flight.
- 1895
  - Percy Pilcher makes his first successful flight in a glider named the Bat.
  - Pablo Suarez flies his Suarez Glider in Argentina, following correspondence with Lilienthal.
  - By the mid-1890s, the Imperial Russian Navy has established "aerostatic parks" on the coasts of the Baltic Sea and Black Sea.
- 1896
  - 6 May – Samuel Pierpont Langley flies the unmanned Aerodrome No. 5 from a houseboat on the Potomac River a distance of 3,300 ft (1,000 m), the first truly successful flight of one of his powered models.
  - June – Octave Chanute organises a flyer camp at Lake Michigan during which both a copy of one of Lilienthal's designs and a biplane built by Chanute are tested.
  - 9 August – Otto Lilienthal crashes after a stall caused by a gust, breaking his back. He dies the following day.
  - October – Ground testing of an all-aluminium airship designed by the Austro-Hungarian engineer David Schwarz and built by Carl Berg, begins in Berlin. Schwarz will die of a heart attack before seeing it fly.
  - November – Samuel Pierpont Langley flies the unmanned Aerodrome No. 6 a distance of 4,200 ft (1,300 m).
  - Germans August von Parseval and Hans Bartsch von Sigsfeld invent the kite balloon for observations in strong winds.
  - William Paul Butusov, a Russian immigrant to U.S., with the Chanute group, construct the Albatross Soaring Machine which achieves an unmanned unpowered uncontrolled hop from a ramp.
  - William Frost, Welsh, flies the Frost Airship Glider 500 meters, possibly with balloon assist.
- 1897
  - 11 June – Salomon Andrée, Nils Strindberg, and Knut Frænkel attempt an expedition to the North Pole by free balloon from Spitsbergen. They crash within three days but manage to survive for several months in the pack ice. Their remains are discovered in 1930 on White Island. It was possible to develop the preserved film material.
  - 12 June – Friedrich Hermann Wölfert and his mechanic are killed when their petrol-powered airship catches fire during a demonstration at the Tempelhof field.
  - 14 October – Clément Ader later asserts that on this date he made a 300 m (980 ft) flight in his steam-powered uncontrolled Avion III also referred to as Aquilon or the Éole III. His claim is disputed. The French Army is not impressed and withdraws funding.
  - 3 November – The first flight in a rigid airship is made by Ernst Jägels, flying the all-aluminium craft designed by David Schwarz and built by Carl Berg. It reaches an altitude of 24 m (79 ft), proving metal-framed airships can become airborne, but after an engine failure is damaged beyond repair in an emergency landing.
  - Carl Rickard Nyberg starts working on his Flugan.
- 1898
  - March – Assistant Secretary of the Navy Theodore Roosevelt calls for the creation of a four-officer board to study the utility of Samuel P. Langley's "flying machine," the Langley Aerodrome. Roosevelt asserts that "the machine has worked." It is the first documented United States Navy expression of interest in aviation. The machine is commissioned by the United States Army Signal Corps.
  - 2 September – Alberto Santos-Dumont flies his first airship design.
  - 22 October – Augustus Moore Herring claims a heavier-than-air flight along the beach at St. Joseph, Michigan, of 70 feet (21 m) by attaching a compressed air motor to a biplane hang glider. However, there are no witnesses.
  - The Aéro-Club de France is founded.
  - The French Navy torpedo boat tender Foudre operates a spherical balloon experimentally during naval maneuvers in the Mediterranean Sea.
  - Lyman Wiswell Gilmore, Jr., American, builds a steam driven monoplane.
  - Edson Fessenden Gallaudet, American, builds a hydroplane.
- 1899
  - The Hague Convention of 1899 prohibits military aircraft from discharging projectiles and explosives, but permits the wartime use of aircraft for reconnaissance and other purposes.
  - The Wright brothers begin experimenting with wing-warping as a means of controlling an aircraft.
  - Samuel Cody begins experiments with kites big enough to lift a person.
  - Percy Pilcher flies various gliders and is close to completing a powered machine but is killed when his glider crashes at Stanford Hall, England after a tail strut fails. Pilcher used a team of horses to pull the glider into the air.
  - 22 November – The first of three British Army observation balloon sections arrives in South Africa to take part in the Second Boer War. The war will see the first large-scale use of observation balloons by the British armed forces.
  - 11 December – A British Army observation balloon section takes part in the Battle of Magersfontein during the Second Boer War.
- 1900
  - February – In the Second Boer War, a British Army observation balloon section takes part in the relief of Ladysmith.
  - 2 July – Count Ferdinand von Zeppelin pilots his experimental first Zeppelin, LZ 1, over Lake Constance, reaching an altitude of 400 metres (1,300 feet) with five men on board. Although the flight lasts only 18 minutes, covers only 5.6 kilometers (3.5 mi), and ends in an emergency landing on the lake, it is the first flight of a truly successful rigid airship.
  - 12 September – The Wright brothers arrive at Kitty Hawk, North Carolina, to begin their first season of glider experiments there.
  - 3 October – Probably on this date, Wilbur Wright makes the Wright brothers' first glider flight at Kitty Hawk. During their tests, they will fly the 1900 glider both as a glider and as a kite under various wind conditions.
  - 17 October – On her second flight, the Zeppelin LZ 1 remains aloft for 80 minutes.
  - 23 October – The Wright brothers abandon their 1900 glider in a sand hollow and break camp at Kitty Hawk to return home to Dayton, Ohio.
  - November – The British Army's observation balloon section's duty in the Second Boer War comes to an end. It is ordered home from South Africa because the Boers have switched to guerrilla tactics, making the balloons unsuitable for supporting British operations.

== Births ==
- 1825
  - 8 February – Henri Giffard, French inventor, dirigible designer (suicide 1882)
- 1838
  - 8 July – Ferdinand von Zeppelin, German airship manufacturer (died 1917)
- 1841
  - 2 April – Clément Ader, French inventor (died 1925)
- 1848
  - 23 May – Otto Lilienthal, German glider pilot (died 1896 in aviation accident)
- 1853
  - 25 July – Park Van Tassel, American balloonist and parachute designer (died 1930)
- 1854
  - 28 March – Sir George White, 1st Baronet, English transport entrepreneur, aircraft manufacturer (died 1916)
- 1858
  - 15 February – John Joseph Montgomery, American aviator (died 1911)
- 1859
  - 3 February – Hugo Junkers, German aircraft manufacturer (died 1935)
- 1863
  - 13 December – Mason Patrick, Chief of United States Army Air Service (died 1942)
- 1865
  - 10 June – E. Lilian Todd, American aircraft designer (died 1937)
- 1866
  - 16 January – Percy Pilcher, English glider pilot (died 1899 in aviation accident)
- 1867
  - 6 March – Samuel Franklin Cody, American-born showman and aviator (died 1913 in aviation accident)
  - 16 April – Wilbur Wright, American aviator (died 1912 of typhoid fever)
- 1871
  - 19 August – Orville Wright, American aviator (died 1948)
- 1872
  - 13 March – Léon Delagrange, French aviator and sculptor (died 1910 in aviation accident)
  - 1 July – Louis Blériot, French aviator (died 1936)
- 1873
  - 3 February
    - Karl Jatho, German aviation pioneer (died 1933)
    - Hugh Trenchard, 1st Viscount Trenchard, English military aviator (died 1956)
  - 20 July – Alberto Santos-Dumont, Brazilian aeronautical engineer (suicide 1932)
  - 26 September – Thérèse Peltier, French sculptor and pioneer aviator (died 1926)
- 1874
  - 26 May – Henri Farman, Anglo-French aviator (died 1958)
- 1875
  - 11 May – Harriet Quimby, American aviator, journalist and screenwriter (died 1912 in aviation accident)
  - 11 September – Horatio Barber, English aviation pioneer (died 1964)
- 1876
  - 14 October – Charles de Tricornot de Rose, French military aviator (died 1916 in aviation accident)
- 1877
  - 22 March – Sefton Brancker, English air vice marshal (died 1930 in aviation accident)
  - 27 August – Charles Rolls, English aviator and automobile pioneer (died 1910 in aviation accident)
- 1878
  - 8 January – Millicent Bryant, Australian pilot (drowned 1927)
  - 21 May – Glenn Curtiss, American aircraft manufacturer (died 1930)
  - 28 September – Lilian Bland, Anglo-Irish journalist and pioneer aviator (died 1971)
  - 29 December – Marthe Niel, French pilot (died 1928)
- 1879
  - 21 August – Claude Grahame-White, English aviator (died 1959)
- 1880
  - 5 February – Gabriel Voisin, French aircraft manufacturer (died 1973)
- 1881
  - 27 September – Raymond Saulnier, French aircraft manufacturer (died 1964)
  - 1 October – William Boeing, American aircraft manufacturer (died 1956)
- 1882
  - 27 July – Geoffrey de Havilland, English aircraft manufacturer and sportsman (died 1965)
  - 19 November – Aurel Vlaicu, Romanian aeronautical engineer and pilot (died 1913 in aviation accident)
- 1883
  - 10 January – Hubert Latham, French aviator (died 1912)
  - 16 January – Oswald Short, English aeronautical engineer (died 1969)
  - 19 July – Louis Paulhan, French aviator (died 1963)
- 1884
  - 8 February – John Moore-Brabazon, 1st Baron Brabazon of Tara, English aviator and politician (died 1964)
  - 14 May – Claude Dornier, German aircraft designer (died 1969)
  - 12 June – Henry Petre, English solicitor and pioneer Australian military aviator (died 1962)
  - 25 October – B. C. Hucks, English aviation pioneer (died 1918)
- 1885
  - 5 March – Graham Gilmour, English aviator (died 1912 in aviation accident)
  - 14 March – Raoul Lufbery, French American fighter ace (died 1918 in action)
  - 6 June – Roy Fedden, English aircraft engine designer (died 1973)
  - 15 November – Frederick Handley Page, English aircraft manufacturer (died 1962)
  - 30 November – Albert Kesselring, German military aviator (died 1960)
- 1886
  - 8 February – Gunther Plüschow, German aviator (died 1931 in aviation accident)
  - 23 February – Didier Masson, French aviator (died 1950)
  - 25 June – Henry H. Arnold, American military aviator, General of the Air Force (died 1950)
  - 23 July – Arthur Whitten Brown, English aviator (died 1948)
- 1887
  - 24 May – Mick Mannock, British fighter ace (died 1918 in action)
  - 22 September – Maurice Prévost, French aviator (died 1952)
  - 26 September – William Barnard Rhodes-Moorhouse, English military aviator (died 1915 of wounds)
  - 11 November – Walther Wever, German military aviator (died 1936 in aviation accident)
- 1888
  - 18 January – Thomas Sopwith, English aircraft manufacturer (died 1989)
  - 24 January – Ernst Heinkel, German aircraft manufacturer (died 1958)
  - 25 May – George Herbert Scott, English aviator (died 1930 in aviation accident)
  - 6 October – Roland Garros, French aviator (died 1918 in action)
  - 29 October (10 November OS) – Andrei Tupolev, Russian aircraft designer (died 1972)
- 1889
  - 22 January – Harry Hawker, Australian-born aviator (died 1921 in aviation accident)
  - 1 May – Herbert Smith, English aeronautical engineer (died 1977)
  - 25 May – Igor Sikorsky, Russian-born aircraft manufacturer (died 1972)
  - 13 June – Adolphe Pégoud, French acrobatic pilot and first fighter ace (died 1915 in action)
  - 25 June – Gustav Hamel, German-born British aviator (lost on flight 1914)
- 1890
  - 6 April – Anthony Fokker, Dutch aircraft manufacturer (died 1939)
  - 13 August – Lydia Zvereva, Russian aviation pioneer (died 1916)
  - 22 August – Hans-Joachim Buddecke, German fighter ace (died 1918 in action)
  - 21 September – Max Immelmann, German fighter ace (died 1916 in action)
  - 8 October – Eddie Rickenbacker, American fighter ace (died 1973)
  - 25 October – Floyd Bennett, American naval aviator (died 1928)
  - 30 December – Lanoe Hawker, English fighter ace (died 1916 in action)
- 1891
  - 22 January – Bruno Loerzer, German military aviator (died 1960)
  - 30 January – Walter Beech, American aircraft manufacturer (died 1950)
  - 18 February – Julius Busa, German fighter ace (died 1917 in action)
  - 3 March – Fritz Rumey, German fighter ace (died 1918 in action)
  - 24 March – Rudolf Berthold, German fighter ace (died 1920 in Kapp Putsch)
  - 5 April – Eric Gordon England, Argentine-born English aviator, pioneer glider pilot and racing driver (died 1970)
  - 16 May – Adolf Ritter von Tutschek, German fighter ace (died 1918 in action)
  - 19 May – Oswald Boelcke, German fighter ace (died 1916 in action)
  - 11 July – Joseph Sadi-Lecointe, French aviator (died 1944)
  - July 30 – Roderic Dallas, Australian World War I fighter ace (died 1918 in action)
  - December 6 – Gotthard Sachsenberg, German naval aviator, fighter ace (died 1961)
  - December 17 – Karl Emil Schäfer, German fighter ace (died 1917 in action)
  - Zee Yee Lee, Chinese aviation pioneer (died 1944)
- 1892
  - January 26 – Bessie Coleman, American pilot (died 1926)
  - 15 March – Charles Nungesser, French fighter ace (died 1927 accident)
  - 30 March – Erhard Milch, German military aviator (died 1972)
  - 6 April – Donald Wills Douglas Sr., American aircraft manufacturer (died 1981)
  - 13 April
    - Arthur "Bomber" Harris, English military aviator (died 1984)
    - Robert Watson-Watt, Scottish pioneer of radar (died 1973)
  - 2 May – Manfred von Richthofen, German fighter ace (died 1918 in combat)
  - 6 July – Willy Coppens, Belgian fighter ace (died 1986)
  - 11 July – Trafford Leigh-Mallory, English military aviator (died 1944 in aviation accident)
  - 17 July – Edwin Harris Dunning, English naval aviator (died 1917 in aviation accident)
  - 5 November – John Alcock, English aviator (died 1919 in aviation accident)
  - 14 November – Dieudonné Costes, French aviator (died 1973)
  - 8 December – Bert Hinkler, Australian pioneer aviator (died 1933 in aviation accident)
  - 24 December – Ruth Chatterton, American actress, novelist and aviator (died 1961)
  - 27 December – Alfred Edwin McKay, Canadian fighter ace (died 1917 in combat)
- 1893
  - 12 January – Hermann Göring, German military aviator (suicide 1946)
  - 5 August – Sydney Camm, English aircraft designer (died 1966)
  - 17 December – Charles C. Banks, English fighter ace (died 1971)
- 1894
  - 7 March – Frank Halford, English aircraft engine designer (died 1955)
  - 27 March – René Fonck, French fighter ace (died 1953)
  - 5 April – Larry Bell, American aircraft manufacturer (died 1956)
  - 6 May – Alan Cobham, English aviator (died 1973)
  - 13 December – Friedrich Hefty, Austro-Hungarian fighter ace (died 1965)
  - 24 December – Georges Guynemer, French fighter ace (died 1917 in action)
- 1895
  - 28 March – James McCudden, English fighter ace (died 1918 in aviation accident)
  - 20 May – R. J. Mitchell, English aircraft designer (died 1937)
  - 14 July – Leefe Robinson, English military aviator (died 1918)
  - 21 September – Juan de la Cierva, 1st Count of la Cierva, Spanish aeronautical engineer (died 1936 in aviation accident)
  - 28 October (probable) – Clyde Pangborn, American aviator (died 1958)
  - 1 November – Arthur Raymond Brooks, American fighter ace and aviator (died 1991)
- 1896
  - 12 April – Edwin Eugene Aldrin Sr., American aviator (died 1974)
  - 26 April – Ernst Udet, German military aviator (suicide 1941)
  - 14 August – Albert Ball, English fighter ace (died 1917 in combat)
- 1897
  - 9 February – Charles Kingsford Smith, Australian aviator (died 1935 in aviation accident)
  - 23 February – Edgar Percival, Australian aircraft designer (died 1984)
  - 24 July – Amelia Earhart, American aviator (lost 1937 on flight)
  - 15 August – Ludovic Arrachart, French aviator (died 1933 in aviation accident)
- 1898
  - 18 January – George McCubbin, South African fighter pilot and cricketer (died 1944)
  - 22 November – Wiley Post, American aviator (died 1935 in aviation accident)
- 1899
  - 17 January – Nevil Shute (Norway), English-born novelist and aeronautical engineer (died 1960)
  - 24 January – Hoyt Vandenberg, American military aviator (died 1954)
  - 9 April – James Smith McDonnell, American aircraft manufacturer (died 1980)
  - 1 August – Jimmie Angel, American aviator (died 1956)
  - 24 August – Max Näther, German fighter ace (died 1919 in combat)
