= Steam-powered aircraft =

Aircraft propelled by a steam engine

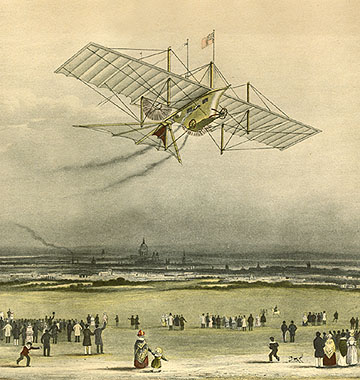
The 1842 Aerial Steam Carriage of Henson and Stringfellow

A steam-powered aircraft is an aircraft propelled by a steam engine. Steam power was used during the 19th century, but fell into disuse with the arrival of the more practical internal combustion engine at the beginning of the pioneer era.

Steam power is distinct from its use as a lifting gas in thermal airships and early balloons.

== History ==
- 1842: The Aerial Steam Carriage of William Samuel Henson and John Stringfellow was patented, but was never successful, although a steam-powered model was flown in 1848.
- 1852: Henri Giffard flew a 3-horsepower (2 kW) steam-powered dirigible over Paris; it was the first powered aircraft.
- 1861 Gustave de Ponton d'Amécourt made a small steam-powered craft, coining the name helicopter.
- 1874: Félix du Temple flew a steam-powered aluminium monoplane off a downhill run. While it did not achieve level flight, it was the first manned heavier-than-air powered flight.
- 1877: Enrico Forlanini built and flew a model steam-powered helicopter in Milan.
- 1882: Alexander Mozhaisky built a steam-powered plane but it did not achieve sustained flight. The engine from the plane is in the Central Air Force Museum in Monino, Moscow.
- 1890: Clément Ader built a steam-powered, bat-winged monoplane, named the Eole. Ader flew it on October 9, 1890, over a distance of 50 metres (160 ft), but the engine was inadequate for sustained and controlled flight. His flight did prove that a heavier-than-air flight was possible. Ader made at least three further attempts, the last two on 12 and 14 October 1897 for the French Ministry of War. There is controversy about whether or not he attained controlled flight. Ader did not obtain funding for his project, and that points to its probable failure.
- 1894: Sir Hiram Stevens Maxim (inventor of the Maxim Gun) built and tested a large rail-mounted, steam-powered aircraft testbed, with a mass of 3.5 long tons (3.6 t) and a wingspan of 110 feet (34 m) in order to measure the lift produced by different wing configurations. The machine unexpectedly generated sufficient lift and thrust to break free of the test track and fly, but was never intended to be operated as a piloted aircraft and so crashed almost immediately owing to its lack of flight controls.
- 1896: Samuel Pierpont Langley successfully flew unpiloted steam-powered models.
- 1897: Carl Richard Nyberg's Flugan developed steam-powered aircraft over a period from 1897 to 1922, but they never achieved more than a few short hops.
- 1899: Gustave Whitehead built, and was purported to have flown, a steam-powered airplane in Pittsburgh, Pennsylvania. Stoker/passenger Louis Darvarich was said to have been injured when the plane crashed into an upper story of an apartment building. Whitehead later claimed to have flown a steam aircraft in Hartford, Connecticut, and to have been visited by one of the Wright brothers well before 1903. Mainstream aviation historians remain unconvinced of the Whitehead claims. The flights have never been verified satisfactorily; there are no photographs, news stories, or other media from 1899 to confirm them. Likewise, the supposed visit of the Wright brothers to Whitehead is apocryphal; other than affidavits taken over thirty years after the fact, there is no evidence the visit ever happened.
- 1902 Lyman Gilmore claimed in 1927 to have flown a steam-powered aircraft on 15 May 1902. The flight was unconfirmed.
- 1920: The Bristol Tramp was to have been a steam-powered aeroplane, but the turbine was over-powered, and the construction of a reliable boiler and condenser circuit was problematic.
- 1931 Harry Crossland Pfaff of Chicago designed and made a steam-powered aircraft. It was to be test flown by round-the-world aviator Clyde Pangborn. There is no record of the flight being made.
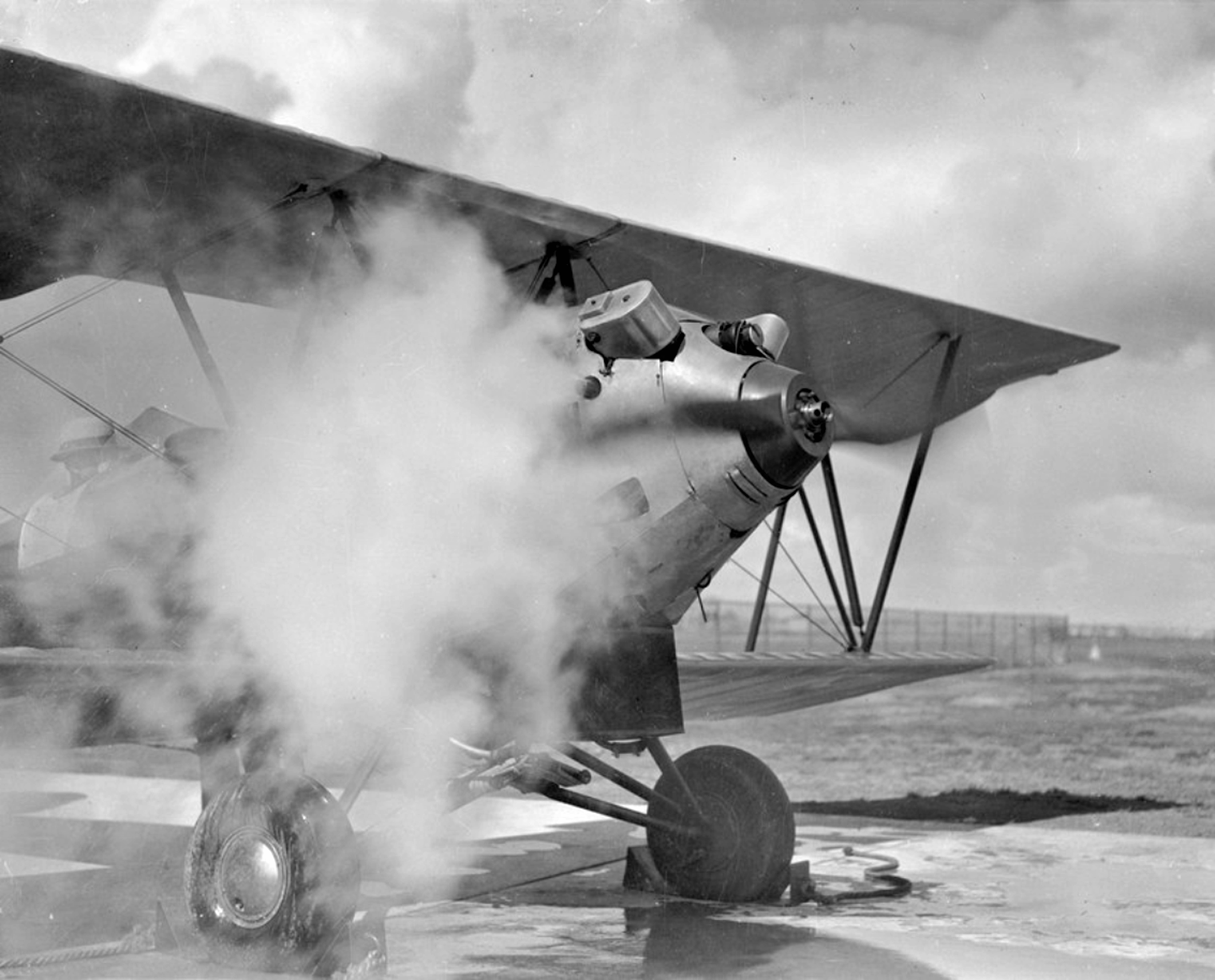
  Steam Driven Travel Air 2000 in 1933
- 1933: George D. Besler and William J. Besler's prototype steam biplane, based on a Travel Air 2000, flew several times at Oakland airport. It was powered by a two-cylinder, 150 hp (110 kW) double-expansion V-twin reciprocating engine weighing about 500 lb (230 kg), designed by the Doble Steam Motors Company and Besler. and was capable of STOL operation due to the ease of reversing the thrust. Several others were working on steam-powered flight at the time. Harold C. Johnson of Akron, Ohio, had made a 146 lb (66 kg) steam engine for an aircraft in autumn 1932. The Great Lakes Aircraft Company of Cleveland, Ohio, was working on a steam-powered biplane. A Paris mechanic developed a light steam-powered engine for aircraft. Swedish steam turbine engineers were working on an aircraft engine, and G. A. Raffaelli, an Italian aeronautical engineer, published a paper in 1931 on a steam-powered engine for stratospheric flight.
- 1934: Newspapers of the time reported a steam-powered aircraft designed by a Mr Huettner, Chief Engineer of the Klingenberg Electric Works in Berlin, that used revolving boiler combined with a steam turbine. The plane was reported to have a design speed of 260 miles per hour (420 km/h) and be capable of 60 to 70 hours non-stop flight. The Berlin reporter of the Czechoslovak Prager Tagblatt, who wrote the article, was arrested, and no more was heard of the project.
- 1938: A British company, Aero Turbines Limited, designed a steam turbine engine similar to Huettner's. The company ceased to exist in 1948.
- 1944: A steam-powered version of the Messerschmitt Me 264, an Amerika Bomber was hypothesized but never constructed. It was to be powered by a steam turbine developing over 6,000 horsepower (4,500 kW) while driving a 5.3 m (17 ft 5 in)-diameter propeller. The fuel would have been a mixture of powdered coal and petroleum. It seems that the steam turbines would have had an SFC of 190 gr/hp/hr. The main advantages of this powerplant were considered to be that it produced consistent power at all altitudes and required low maintenance.
- 1960s: Conceptual drawings were made for Don Johnson of Thermodynamic Systems Inc., Newport Beach, California, of a steam engine to be installed in a Hughes 300 helicopter. The steam engine was a compact cylindrical double-acting uniflow (similar in layout to the Dyna-Cam Aero engine), but no prototype was ever made by Controlled Steam Dynamics, Inc.
