= Du Temple Monoplane =

1874 aircraft

Monoplane
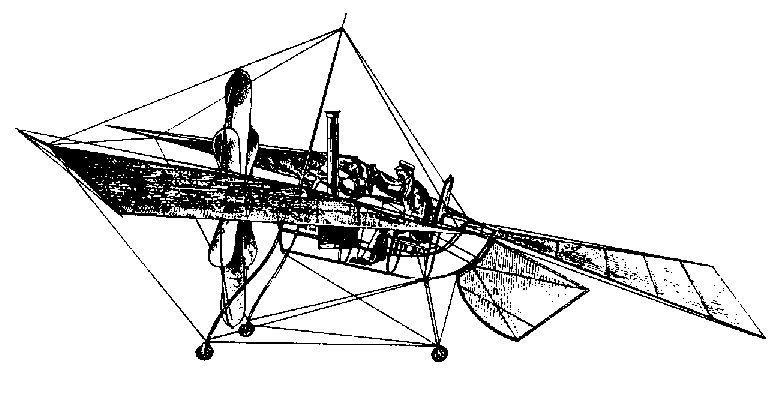
- The Du Temple Monoplane

General information
- Type: Experimental Steam aircraft
- National origin: France
- Manufacturer: Félix du Temple

History
- First flight: 1874

The du Temple Monoplane was a steam-powered aircraft made of aluminium, built in Brest, France, by naval officer Félix du Temple in 1874. It had a wingspan of 13 m (43 ft) and weighed 80 kg (180 lb) without the pilot.

Several trials were made with the aircraft, and it is generally recognized that it achieved lift-off. It was described by Dollfus as a "short hop or leap"; Flight International described the plane as having "staggered briefly into the air" – (from a combination of its own power and running down an inclined ramp) It glided for a short time and returned safely to the ground, making it the first successful powered flight in history, though not the first self-powered one.

It was displayed at the 1878 Exposition Universelle ("World Fair") in Paris.

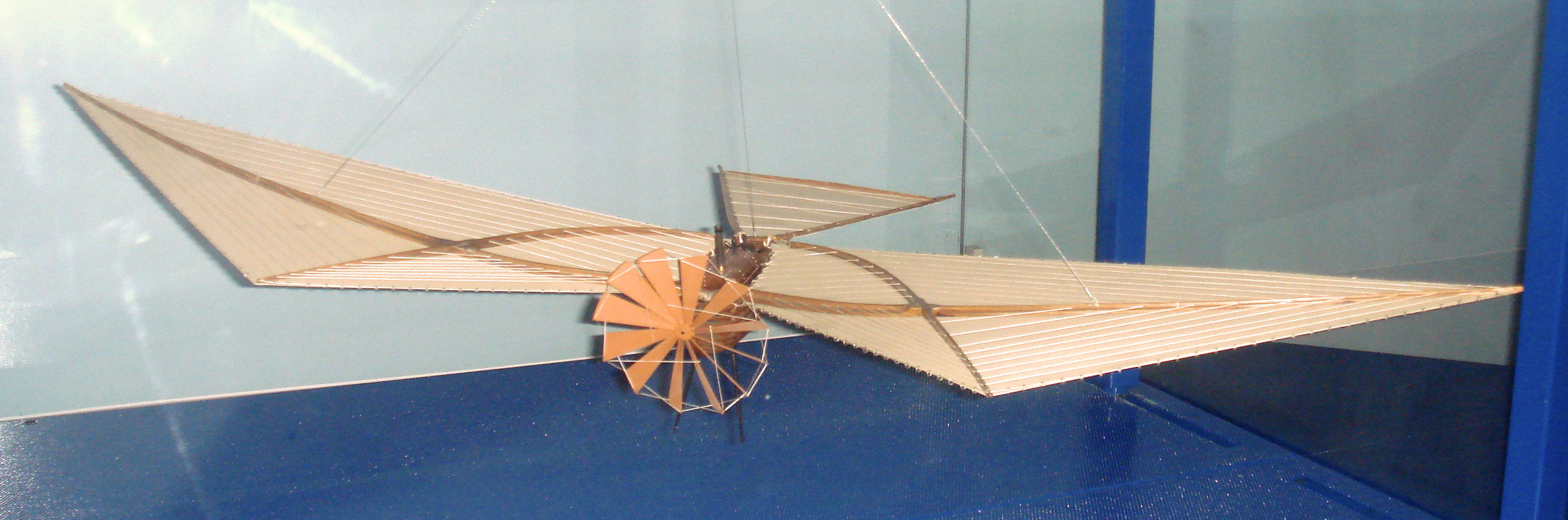
Reconstructed model of Du Temple's 1857 flying machine at the Musée de l'Air et de l'Espace.

== Steam engine ==
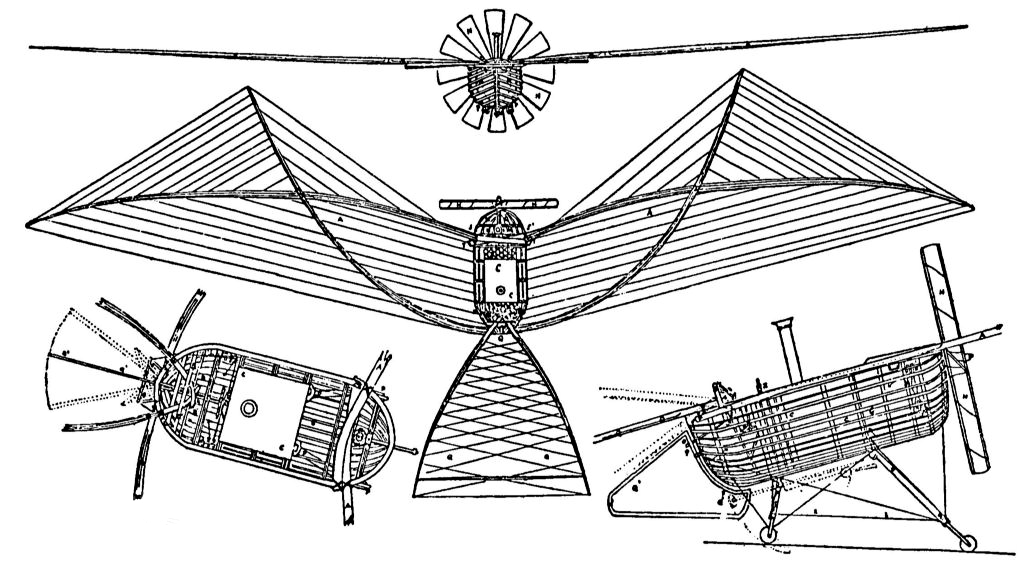
1857 patent drawing of Félix du Temple's flying machine, the "Canot planeur".

The aircraft used a very compact, high-speed circulation steam engine for which Félix du Temple applied for a patent on 28 April 1876. The engine used very small pipes packed together "to obtain the highest possible contact surface for the smallest possible volume"

"When he began with the aid of his brother, M. Louis du Temple, to experiment on a large scale, the inadequacy of all motors then known became apparent. They first tried steam at very high pressures, then a hot-air engine, and finally built and patented, in 1876 a very light steam boiler weighing from 39 to 44 lb. to the horse power, which appears to have been the prototype of some of the light boilers which have since been constructed. It consisted in a series of very thin tubes less than 1/8 in. in internal diameter, through which water circulated very rapidly, and was flashed into steam by the surrounding flame."

This type of boiler, which boils the water instantly, has come to be known as a flash boiler. The engine design was later adopted by the French Navy for the propulsion of the first French torpedo boats:

"Officers and engineers have now made up their opinion regarding Du Temple's steam engine. Everybody proclaims the superiority of its qualities… orders are pouring in from our commercial harbours and from the French government."

== See also ==
- Early flying machines
- History of aviation
- Timeline of aviation in the 19th century
