= Timeline of aviation before the 18th century =

Timeline
of aviation
pre-18th century
18th century
19th century
20th century
21st century begins

This is a list of aviation-related events occurring before the end of the 17th century (on 31 December 1700):

== Antiquity ==
- c. 1700 BC
  - Greek myth of Icarus and Daedalus explores the desire to fly and the inherent dangers of it.
- c. 850 BC
  - Legendary King Bladud attempts to fly over the city of Trinovantum (London), but falls to his death.
- c. 500 BC
  - The Chinese start to use kites.
- c. 400 BC
  - The Chinese invent an early form of the Bamboo-copter using feathers.
  - The Greek mathematician Archytas of Tarentum demonstrates an artificial pigeon on a wire. It may have been a kite.
- c. 200 BC
  - The Chinese invent the sky lantern, the first hot air balloon: from its military use it became known as the Kongming lantern.
- c. 100 AD
  - When Wang Mang tried to recruit a specialist scout to Xiong Nu, a man binding himself with bird feathers glides about 100 meters.

== Middle Ages ==
- c. 559
  - Yuan Huangtou, Ye, first manned kite glide to take off from a tower.
- c. 875
  - According to 17th-century historian Ahmad al-Maqqari, Abbas Ibn Firnas of the Emirate of Córdoba attempted flight using feathers and wings, though no mention of it independent of al-Maqqari has survived.
- c. 1003
  - Jauhari attempts flight by some apparatus from the roof of a mosque in Nishapur, Khorasan, Iran, and falls to his death as a result.
- c. 1010
  - Eilmer of Malmesbury builds a wooden glider and, launching from a bell tower, glides 200 metres.
- c. 1165
  - During a lavish display of the wonders of the Byzantine Empire by Emperor Manuel I Komnenos in the Hippodrome of Constantinople, a "Turk" attempts to fly by jumping off of one of the central pillars with some form of winged construct, plummeting to his death.
- c. 1241
  - The Mongolian army uses lighted kites in the battle of Legnica.
- c. 1250
  - Roger Bacon writes the first known technical description of flight, describing an ornithopter design in his book Secrets of Art and Nature.

== Modern Era ==
- c. 1485 – c. 1513
  - Leonardo da Vinci designs an ornithopter with control surfaces. He envisions and sketches flying machines such as helicopters and parachutes, and notes studies of airflows and streamlined shapes.
- c. 1500
  - Hieronymus Bosch shows in his triptych The temptation of St. Anthony, among other things, two fighting airships above a burning town.
- c. 1558
  - Giambattista della Porta publishes a theory and a construction manual for a kite.
- 1595
  - Fausto Veranzino illustrates a design for a parachute in his book Machinae novae (New machines). His "homo volans" (Flying man) design is based on the sail of a ship.
- 1630
  - Evliya Çelebi reports that Hezarfen Ahmet Celebi glided with artificial wings from the top of Galata Tower in Istanbul and managed to fly over the Bosphorus, landing successfully on the Doğancılar square in Üsküdar.
- 1633
  - Evliya Çelebi reports that Lagari Hasan Çelebi flew himself in a rocket artificially-powered by gunpowder.
- 1638
  - John Wilkins, Bishop of Chester, suggests some ideas to future would-be pilots in his book The Discovery of a World in the Moon.
- 1644
  - Italian physicist Evangelista Torricelli manages to demonstrate atmospheric pressure, and also produces a vacuum.
- 1654
  - Physicist and mayor of Magdeburg, Otto von Guericke measures the weight of air and demonstrates his famous Magdeburger Halbkugeln (hemispheres of Magdeburg).Sixteen horses are unable to pull apart two completely airless hemispheres which stick to each other only because of the external air pressure.
- 1670
  - Jesuit Father Francesco Lana de Terzi describes in his treatise Prodomo a vacuum-airship-project, considered the first realistic, technical plan for an airship. His design is for an aircraft with a boat-like body equipped with a sail, suspended under four globes made of thin copper; he believes the craft would rise into the sky if air was pumped out of the globes. No example is built, and de Terzi writes: God will never allow that such a machine be built…because everybody realises that no city would be safe from raids…
- 1679
  - Italian physicist Giovanni Alfonso Borelli, the father of biomechanics, shows in his treatise On the movements of animals that the flapping of wings with the muscle power of the human arm cannot successfully produce flight.
- 1687
  - Isaac Newton (1642–1727) publishes his Philosophiae Naturalis Principia Mathematica, the basis of classical physics. In book II he presented the theoretical derivation of the essence of the drag equation.
