= Paul Haenlein =

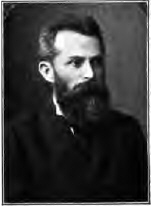
- Born: 17 October 1835; Cologne, Rhine Province, Kingdom of Prussia
- Died: 27 January 1905 (aged 69); Mainz, German Empire
- Occupation: Engineer
- Known for: Development of dirigible with internal combustion engine

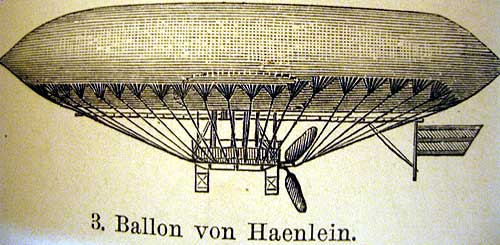
Airship of Haenlein

Paul Haenlein (17 October 1835 in Cologne – 27 January 1905 in Mainz) was a German engineer and flight pioneer. He flew in a semi-rigid-frame dirigible. His family belonged to the Citoyens notables, those notabilities who led the economy, administration and culture of Mainz.

Haenlein received an education as a mechanical engineer and pattern maker. He studied at the Technische Hochschule in Karlsruhe. Subsequently he worked as graduated civil engineer for different factories. He was the first to create a dirigible airship which was powered by an internal combustion engine. This Lenoir-type motor obtained its fuel from the gas in the balloon. It had four horizontal cylinders, which delivered about 6 horsepower (4.5 kW) with a consumption of approximately 250 cubic feet (7.1 m^{3}) of gas per hour. With a mass of 233 kg and an engine displacement of 19.2 L it delivered a continuous power of 2.7 kW. The gas was sucked from the envelope of the balloon, which was kept fully inflated by pumping in compensating air to the air bags inside the main envelope. Due to the consumption of gas, the lifting force decreased, so the range of the airship had been limited.

In 1872 Haenlein obtained a U.S. patent (No. 130 915) to use the otherwise wasted gas in the dirigible's engines. On 13 December, Paul Haenlein tested the first airship with a gas engine in Brünn, achieving 19 km/h. This airship was a direct forerunner of the Lebaudy type, 164 feet (50 m) in length, 30 feet (9.1 m) greatest diameter, and with a cubic capacity of 85,000 feet (26,000 m). The airship achieved 19 km/h. The tests were stopped later, because of a shortage of money.

A propeller of 15 feet (4.6 m) in diameter was driven by the Lenoir engine with 40 revolutions per minute. This was the first instance of the use of an internal combustion engine in connection with aeronautical experiments.

The envelope of the dirigible was rendered airtight by means of an internal rubber coating, with a thinner film on the outside. Syngas, used for inflation, formed a suitable fuel for the engine, but limited the height to which the dirigible could ascend. Such trials as were made were carried out with the dirigible held captive. A full experiment was prevented because funds ran low, but Haenlein's work constituted a distinct advance on all that had been done previously.

The grave of Paul Haenlein at the Hauptfriedhof in Mainz, Germany.

This engine type had the disadvantage of requiring either a gas-producer or a large storage capacity for the gas, either of which makes the total weight of the power plant much greater than that of a petrol engine.
