= Spyridon Psaroudakis =

Mathematician, physicist, and engineer

Spyridon Psaroudakis (Greek: Σπυρίδων Ψαρουδάκης; 1850s-1921) was a mathematician/physicist and engineer known for an automatic keyboard-operated Morse manipulator type he developed in 1884, as well as other inventions involving improvement of steam engines, urban lamps, automatic mechanisms for railway lines etc. Though, he is mostly credited as being the first modern Greek to conduct studies and experiments regarding heavier-than-air flying machines.

Detail (including sketch) from the book on flight published by Spyridon Psaroudakis in 1878

== Biography ==
=== Early life ===
He was born in Rethymno, Crete, son of Konstantinos Psaroudakis, a teacher renowned for his studies in Byzantine Music. He studied Mathematics and Physics at the University of Athens, and worked as a Mathematics teacher in his hometown. Later, he also studied Engineering at the National Technical University of Athens.

=== Studies and experiments at flight ===
In 1878 he published in Athens a theoretical and experimental study on the mechanics of flight, where he presented extensive calculations and experiments (testing parts of related devices) regarding the ability of a powered heavier-than-air machine to fly carrying a human. He reportedly conducted further experiments including, according to accounts by his former students, construction of a heavier-than-air device, which he tested from a hill near his native Rethymno in autumn 1880 (when the island was still under Ottoman rule), exhibiting the ability of rotating objects to stay airborne. Although later reports suggest an attempt for manned flight, such attempt has not been documented. The device was reportedly destroyed during tests and no image or details have survived. He reportedly presented his results to University Professors in Athens, but, despite the encouragement he received, he was unable to gain any financial support, and soon switched to other fields.

=== Life in France ===
In ca1882 he moved to France, where he was involved in other inventions (a type of Morse manipulator, urban lamps, automatic mechanisms for railway lines etc.) However, he reportedly became embroiled in legal disputes over his inventions which lead to financial and legal troubles. Psaroudakis returned to Greece, and died in Athens in 1921, reportedly facing mental health problems.
