= Francisque Arban =

French balloonist (1815–1849)

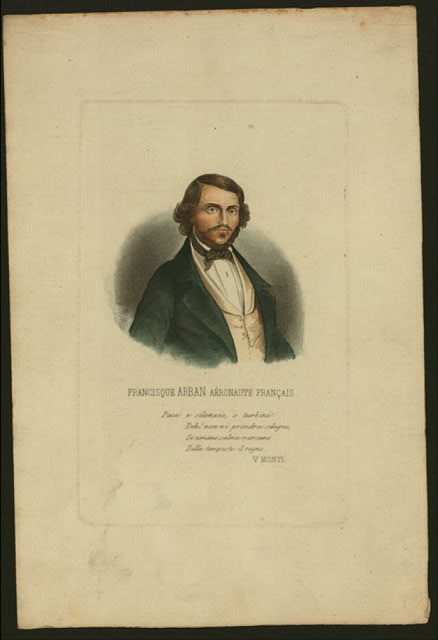
- Francisque Arban, print published in Italy between 1830 and 1850, from the Library of Congress
- Born: 1815; Lyon, France
- Died: 7 October 1849 (aged 33–34); Mediterranean Sea
- Occupation: Balloonist
- Known for: First person to cross the Alps in a balloon

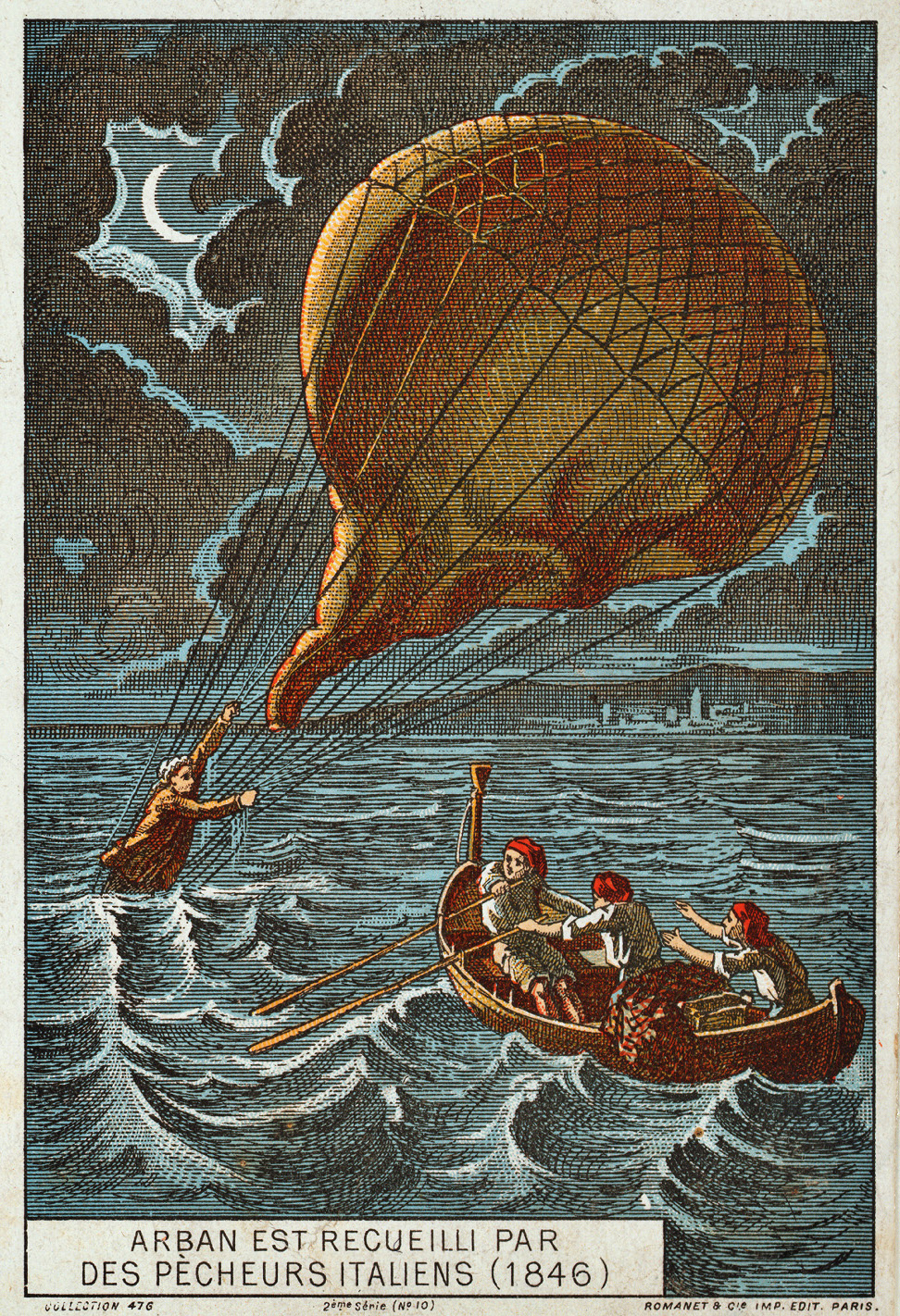
Arban est recueilli par des pécheurs Italiens (1846) – Arban is rescued by Italian fishermen (1846), from a series of cards at the Library of Congress

Francisque Arban, also known as Francesco Arban di Lione (1815 – disappeared 7 October 1849), was a French balloonist. In 1849, he was the first person to cross the Alps in a balloon, a feat not repeated until 1924. He disappeared over the Mediterranean Sea in 1849.

== Biography ==
Arban was born in Lyon, one of the ten children of Simon Arban, artificier. A younger brother was the cornetist Jean-Baptiste Arban.

He made several balloon flights starting in 1832, but mostly in Italy between 1845 and 1849. He made his twelfth flight from Rome in April 1846, and he was rescued from the sea after a flight from Trieste later in 1846.

He is best known for his hydrogen balloon flight in 1849, crossing the Alps from Marseille to Turin. He departed from the Chateau-des-Fleurs at 6.30pm on 2 September 1849 and ascended to about 13,000 feet (4,000 m) over the Massif de l'Esterel. He passed Monte Viso in the Cottian Alps at 1:30am on 3 September, to the south of Mont Blanc, at about 15,000 feet (4,600 m) and landed at 2.30am on 3 September, on a farm in the village of Pion Porte, near Stupinigi, about 4 miles (6.4 km) west of Turin.

== Disappearance ==
He took off on a balloon flight from Barcelona on 7 October 1849, but his balloon was blown over the Mediterranean Sea. He disappeared without trace, and is thought to have died shortly afterwards, however many newspapers reported in November 1853, that he had allegedly survived, being captured and in slavery for two years before escaping. The Illustrated London News said, "The Spanish journals state the French aeronaut, Arban, who made an ascent from Barcelona more than two years ago, and had not since been heard of, and who was believed to have fallen into the sea and been drowned, has made his appearance again. An Alicant letter says that his balloon went over to Africa, and that he was seized and made a slave, and continued in that state for two years, when he effected his escape."

== See also ==
- List of people who disappeared mysteriously at sea
