= Park Van Tassel =

Parker (Park) Albert Van Tassel
- Born: 25 July 1853; Cass County, Indiana, U.S.
- Died: 24 October 1930 (aged 77); Oakland, California, U.S.
- Occupations: Aerial exhibitionist with balloons and parachutes
- Known for: Pioneer aviator
- Spouses: Elizabeth Spencer (1872-1876?), Ella Block (1879-1885), Clara A. Coykendall (1885-1890), Edith Ann Nowlan (1892-1894?), A. F. Barr (1912-?)
- Children: two sons

Park Albert Van Tassel (25 July 1853 – 24 October 1930) was an American pioneering aerial exhibitionist in the United States. Van Tassel made the first balloon flights in New Mexico, Utah, and Colorado and helped invent and introduce methods of parachute jumping from balloons. His efforts helped introduce ballooning and parachuting internationally and also helped introduce women to these sports.

== New Mexico ==
In May, 1882 Van Tassel expressed interest in making a balloon ascension at Albuquerque, New Mexico. After a full day of inflation with coal gas from the Albuquerque Gas Works, Van Tassel made the first human flight in New Mexico at 6:15pm on July 4, 1882. He launched from an area near Second Street between Railroad (Central) and Gold Avenues. Van Tassel rose slowly in his City of Albuquerque balloon to an apex of 11,000 feet despite it being only 2/3 full of lifting gas. His safe landing near the fairgrounds near Central Avenue and Rio Grande Blvd. was hailed as a complete success. Today, Albuquerque is home to the annual Albuquerque International Balloon Fiesta, the largest gathering of hot air and gas balloons in the world.

== National and international balloon tours ==
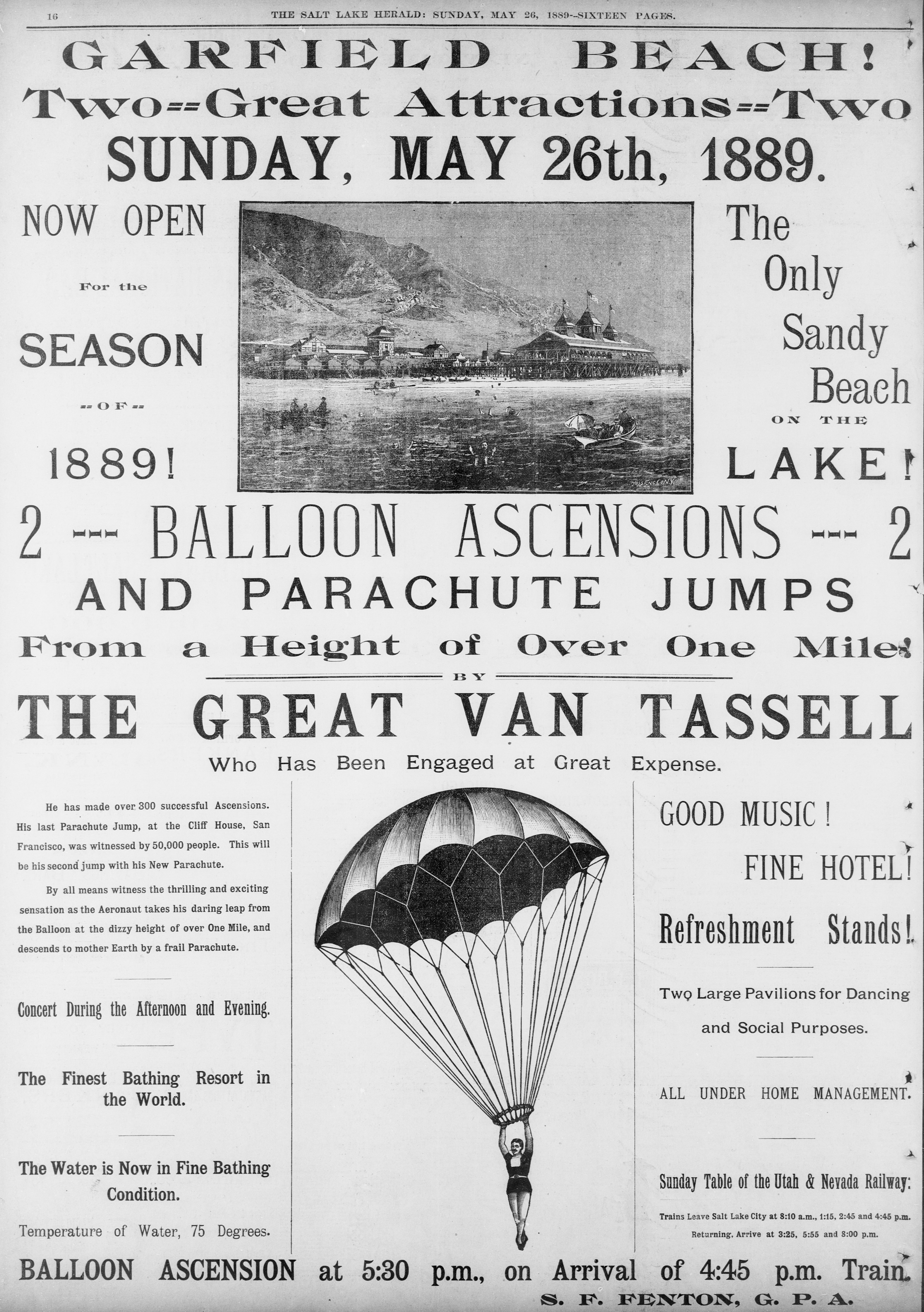
Newspaper advertisement for a parachute jump by Park Van Tassel in 1889 at Utah

Van Tassel toured the American west, providing balloon ascensions at locations in Utah, the northwest, New Orleans, California, Colorado, Kansas City, Missouri, Oregon, Washington and other locations in the west. In Scientific American he suggested the possibility of a transcontinental balloon voyage across North America in 1886, something unheard of at the time. Together with Thomas Scott Baldwin, Van Tassel co-invented a parachute, used by Baldwin to make the first parachute jump in the western United States on January 30, 1887 at San Francisco. In competition with other daredevils such as Baldwin, Percival G. Spencer, James Price, and others, he later toured the world with his Van Tassel Troupe, associated with balloon ascensions and parachute jumps. His troupe is credited with the first successful parachute jump in Hawaii, first balloon flights and parachute jumps by women in Australia, early balloon flights in India, the first flight in Bangladesh, Sri Lanka, and other locations in southeast Asia. Many of these events also helped to pioneer women's efforts in early aviation as a part of the Troupe.

== California ==
Van Tassel returned to the United States, living in the San Francisco Bay area and continuing his ballooning in Oakland. He briefly assisted in high-altitude glider flights arranged by John J. Montgomery near Santa Clara and helped establish balloon clubs such as the Pacific Aero Club and the Oakland Aero Club, making several recreational flights in his large City of Oakland balloon. He also patented a mechanical toy parachute in the 1921.

== Family life ==
Van Tassel married Elizabeth Spencer in 1872 at Indiana, divorced and married Ella Block in San Joaquin, California in 1879. In 1885 he divorced Block and married Clara A. Coykendall at San Jose, California. In 1888, Clara became the first woman to make a parachute jump in the western United States. Clara filed for divorce in 1890, and Van Tassel married Edith Ann Nowlan in 1892 in India. After returning to California in 1900 without Nowlan, Van Tassel married again in 1912 to A. F. Barr at Oakland. He died October 24, 1930 at Oakland following a heart attack.

== Associates ==
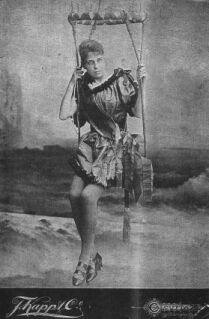
Jeanette Rumary (as "Jeanette Van Tassell") died following the first manned flight in Bangladesh in 1892.

Several individuals were associated with Van Tassel's aerial exhibitions including:

Clara Van Tassel (wife)
Joe Lawrence as "Joseph Van Tassell"
James Price as "James Van Tassell"
Valerie Frietas as "Valerie Van Tassell"
Gladys Frietas as "Gladys Van Tassell"
Jeannette Rummary as "Jeannette Van Tassell"
Thomas Scott Baldwin
William Ivy as "Ivy Baldwin"
John Joseph Montgomery

== Honors ==
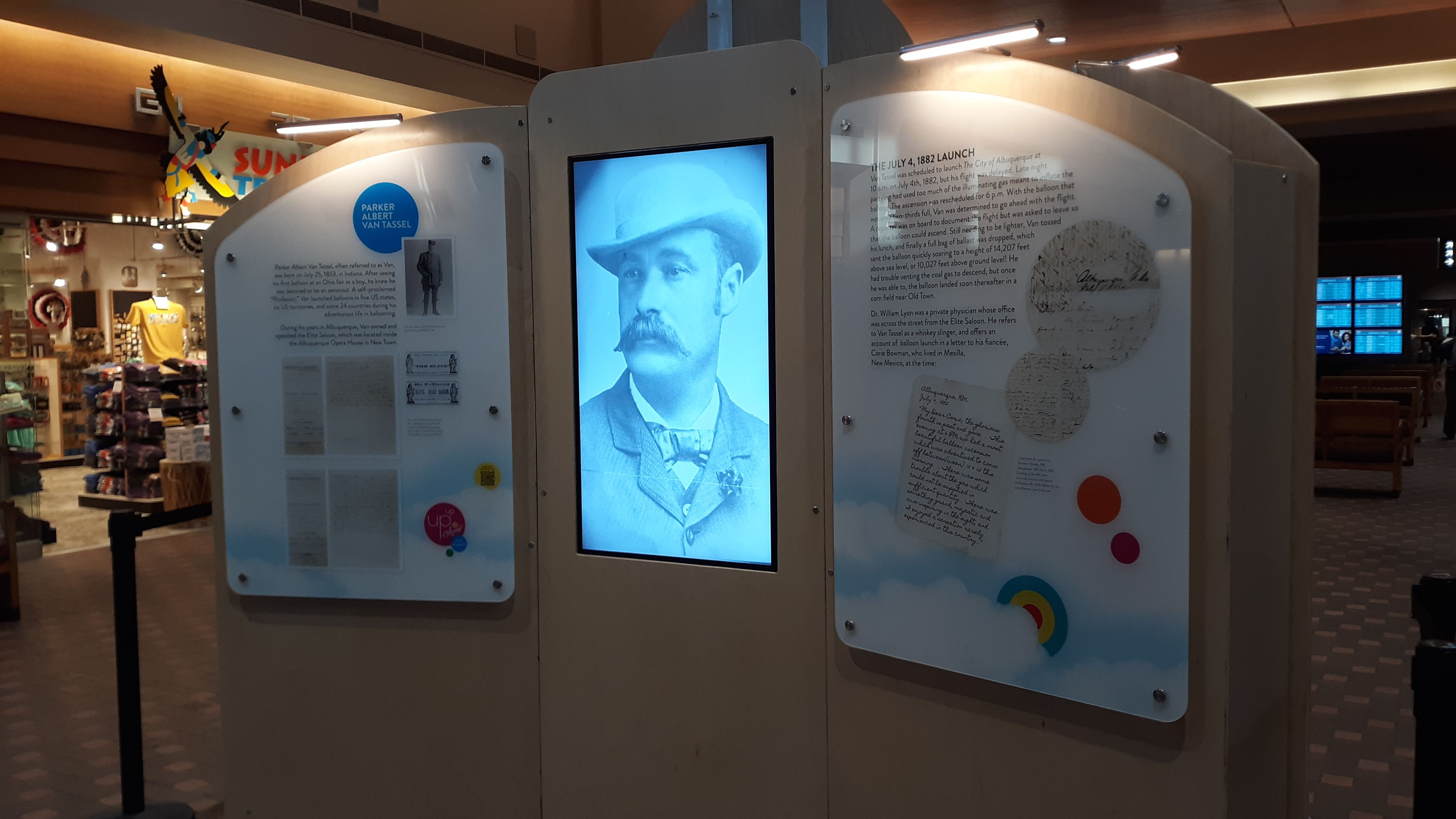

A new exhibit featuring Park Van Tassel and the history of ballooning in New Mexico was launched at the Albuquerque International Sunport in September, 2021.
