= Félix du Temple de la Croix =

French naval officer and inventor (1823–1890)

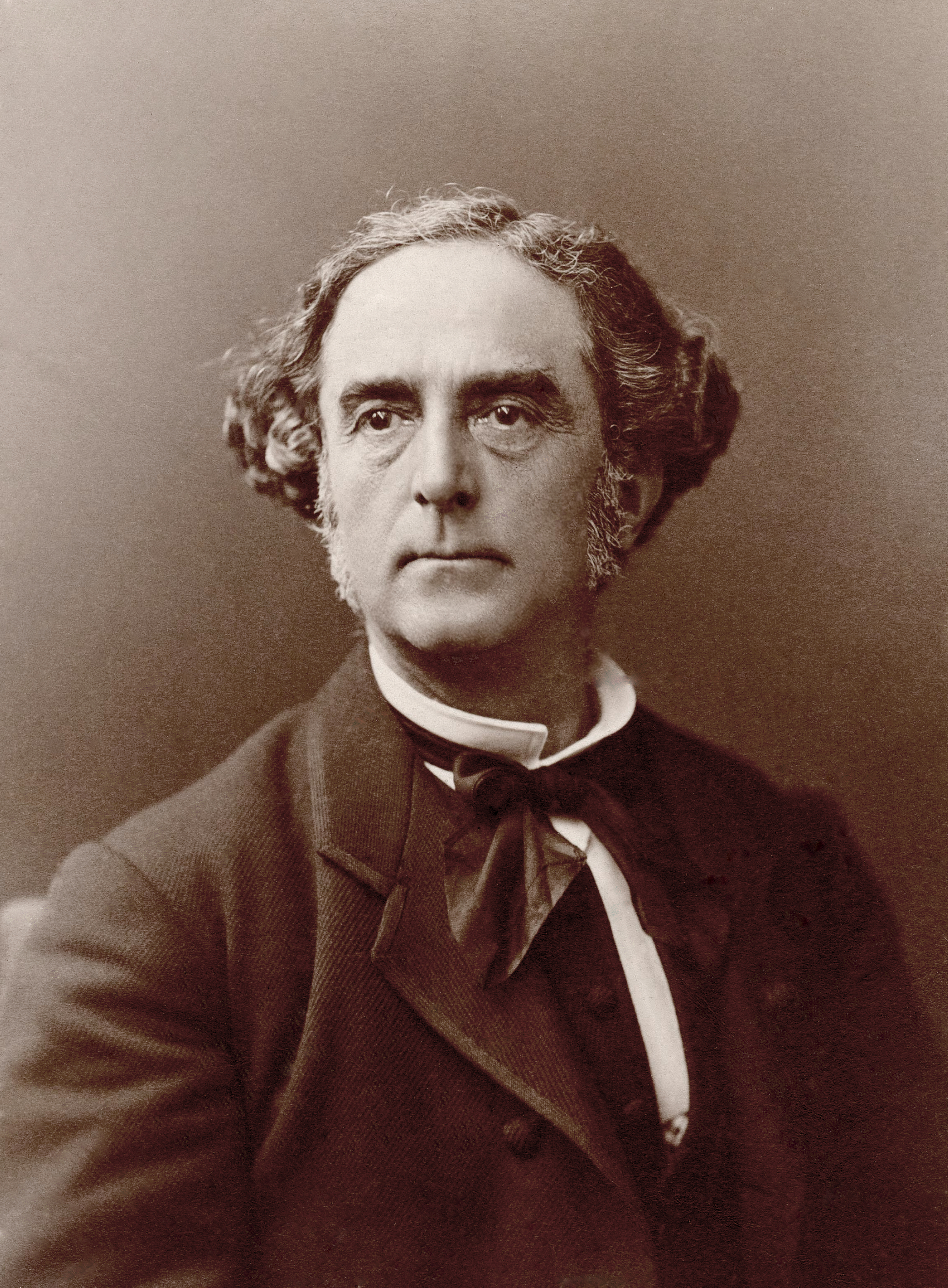
Félix du Temple de la Croix (1823–1890).

Félix du Temple de la Croix (18 July 1823 – 3 November 1890) (usually simply called Félix du Temple) was a French naval officer and an inventor, born into an ancient Norman family. He developed some of the first flying machines and is credited with the first successful flight of a powered aircraft of any sort, a powered model plane, in 1857 and is sometimes credited with the first manned powered flight in history aboard his Monoplane in 1874.

He was a contemporary of Jean-Marie Le Bris.

== Military life ==
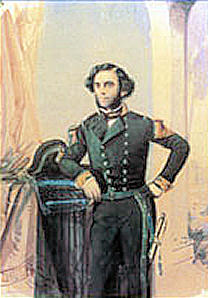
Félix du Temple as a young Naval officer.

Félix du Temple entered the French Navy Academy (École Navale) in 1838. He participated in most of the conflicts during the Second French Empire, especially the Crimean War, the French intervention in Italy against Austria, and the French intervention in Mexico.

At the age of 41, he returned to France, became a captain (Capitaine de Frégate), and joined the Loire Army (Armée de la Loire). A partisan of the Comte de Chambord and a legitimist (an "Ultra-Royalist"), he was forced to quit the Navy in 1876.

== Flying machine patent ==
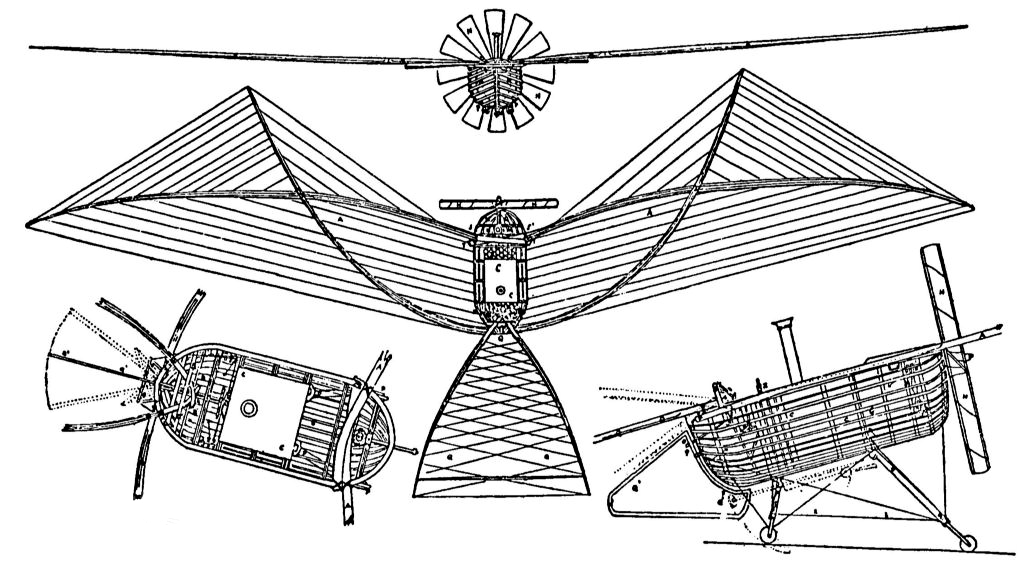
1857 patent drawing of Félix du Temple's flying machine, the "Canot planeur".

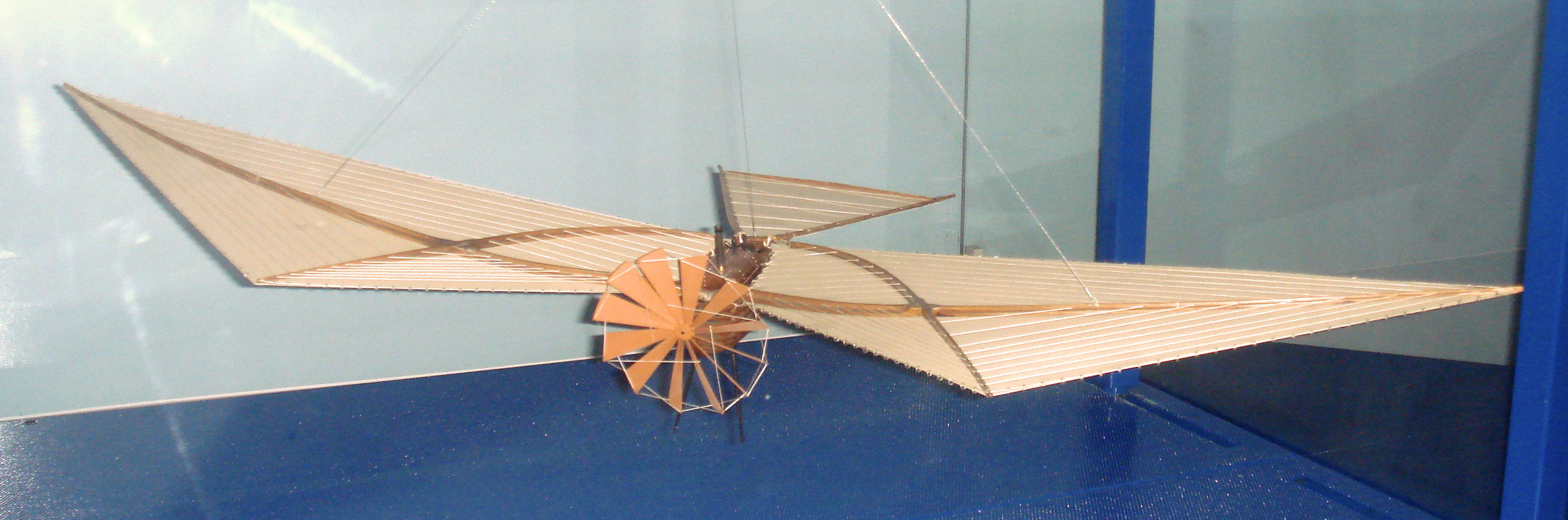
Reconstructed model of Du Temple's 1857 flying machine at the Musée de l'Air et de l'Espace.

Félix du Temple accomplished the first successful flight of a powered aircraft of any sort, a model plane that was able to take-off under its own power, in 1857. There are however competing claims for the first "assisted" powered flight, with John Stringfellow's experiments in 1848.

Félix du Temple patented the designs for his aerial machine in 1857, which incorporated a retractable wheel landing gear, a propeller, a 6 hp engine and a dihedral wing design, under the title "Locomotion aérienne par imitation du vol des oiseaux" ("Aerial locomotion by imitation of the flight of birds"). He built several large models together with his brother Luis. One of them, weighing 700 grams, was able to fly, first using a clockwork mechanism as an engine, and then using a miniature steam engine. The two brothers managed to make the models take off under their own power, fly a short distance and land safely.

As they tried to build a machine capable of carrying a man, they realized that steam engines lacked power and were too heavy. In 1867 they designed an original "hot air" engine, which did not prove satisfactory. They also experimented with the new internal combustion gas engine design developed by Lenoir, but this also lacked the necessary power.

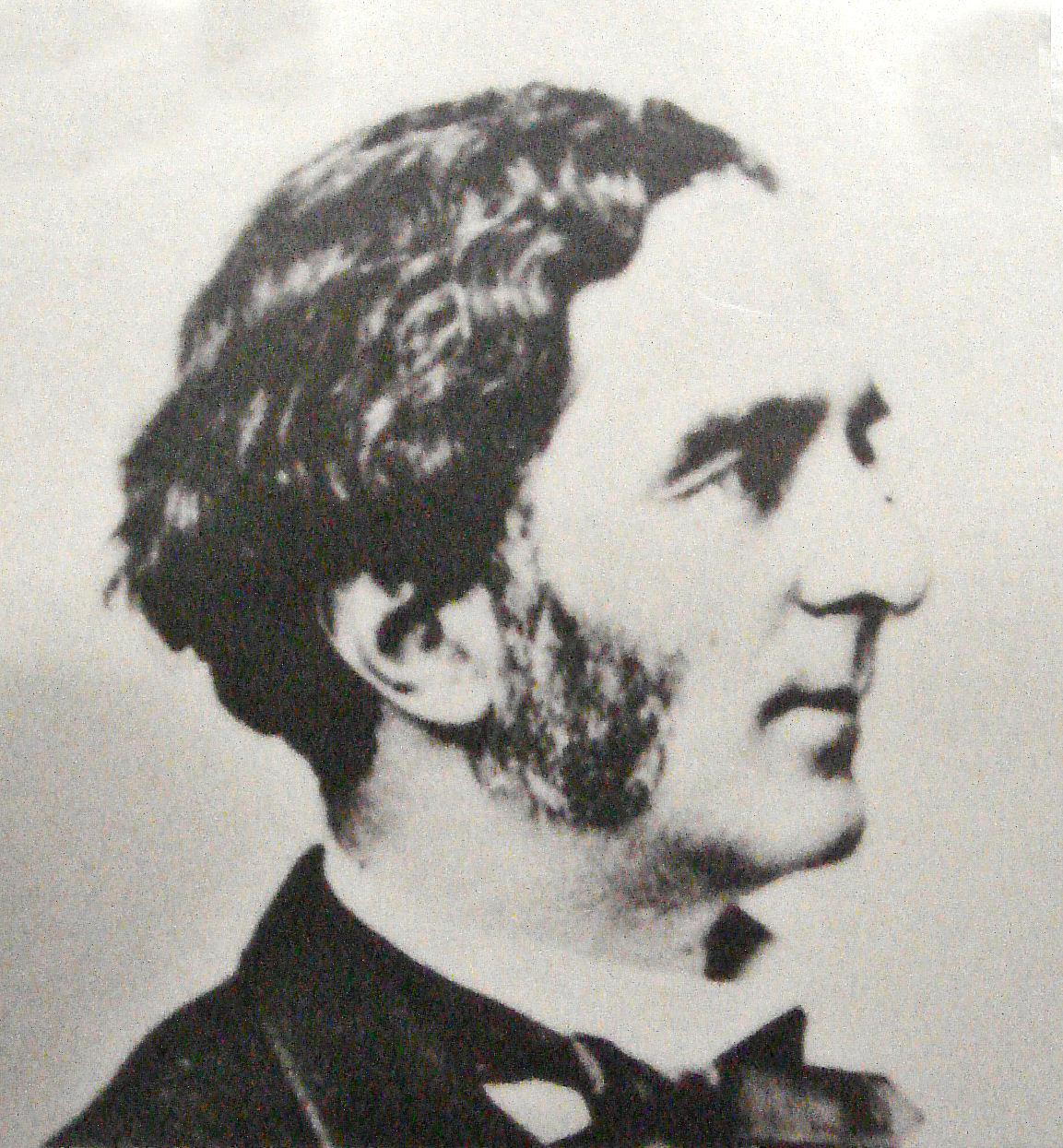
Felix du Temple de la Croix du Temple circa 1870.

Du Temple continued his research and finally succeeded in creating a very compact high-speed circulation steam engine, for which he applied for a patent on 28 April 1876. The engine used very small pipes packed together "to obtain the highest possible contact surface for the smallest possible volume"

"When he began with the aid of his brother, M. Louis du Temple, to experiment on a large scale, the inadequacy of all motors then known became apparent. They first tried steam at very high pressures, then a hot-air engine, and finally built and patented, in 1876 a very light steam boiler weighing from 39 to 44 lb. to the horse power, which appears to have been the prototype of some of the light boilers which have since been constructed. It consisted in a series of very thin tubes less than 1/8 inches in internal diameter, through which water circulated very rapidly, and was flashed into steam by the surrounding flame." Octave Chanute, Aeroplanes: Part III, August 1892

== The "Monoplane" ==
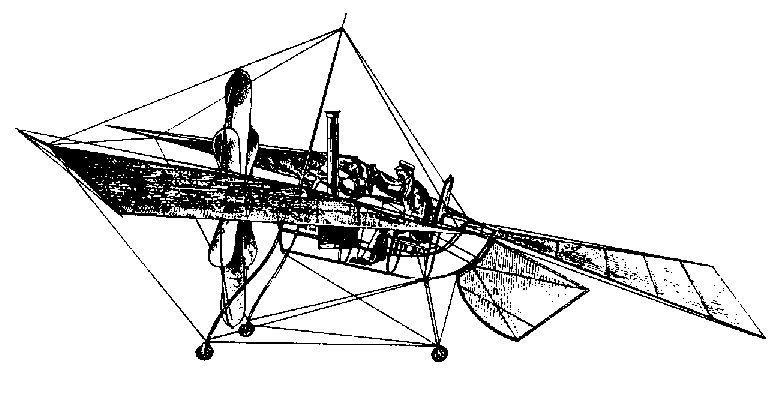
Félix du Temple's 1874 Monoplane.

In 1874, the two brothers built the Monoplane, a large plane made of aluminium in Brest, France, with a wingspan of 13 meters and a weight of only 80 kilograms (without the pilot). Several trials were made with the plane, and it is generally recognized that it achieved lift off under its own power after a ski-jump run, glided for a short time and returned safely to the ground, possibly making it the first successful powered flight in history, depending on the definition — since the flight was only a short distance and a short time.

The plane was displayed at the 1878 World Fair (Exposition Universelle (1878)) in Paris.

== High-circulation steam engine ==
The plane's engine used a very compact, high-speed circulation steam boiler, the Du Temple boiler, for which Félix du Temple applied for a patent on 28 April 1876. The engine used very small pipes packed together "to obtain the highest possible contact surface for the smallest possible volume".

The original steam engine which had been developed by Félix du Temple was later commercialized by him from a company he established in Cherbourg, "Générateur Du Temple S.A." and became highly successful. The design was adopted by the French Navy for the propulsion of the first French torpedo boats:

"Officers and engineers have now made up their opinion regarding Du Temple's steam engine. Everybody proclaims the superiority of its qualities… orders are pouring in from our commercial harbours and from the French government." Revue Maritime 1888 (L’opinion est faite aujourd’hui sur la chaudière Du Temple parmi les officiers et les ingénieurs. Tout le monde proclame ses qualités supérieures… les commandes affluent de nos ports de commerce et de la part du gouvernement français.)

== Industrial legacy ==
Following his death in 1890, his successors took over the management of the company. "Générateur Du Temple S.A.", acquired the Lesénéchal company in 1905, and by 1918 had several hundred employees when it was absorbed by the shipbuilding company Société Normande de Construction Navale.

== Quote ==
"In general, birds, especially the largest ones, only rise and fly because of an acquired speed: this speed which is necessary to rise is obtained either by running on the ground or on water, or by jumping from a high point. Once arrived at a certain height that allows him to fly horizontally and move forward with just the flap of the wings, he gains speed, spreads his wings and tail so as to form as flat a surface as possible, and thus moves forward without any visible movement of the wings and without falling significantly"

— Félix du Temple.

== See also ==
- List of early flying machines
- Timeline of aviation - 19th century
- History of aviation
