= Thomas Harris (aviator) =

English balloonist

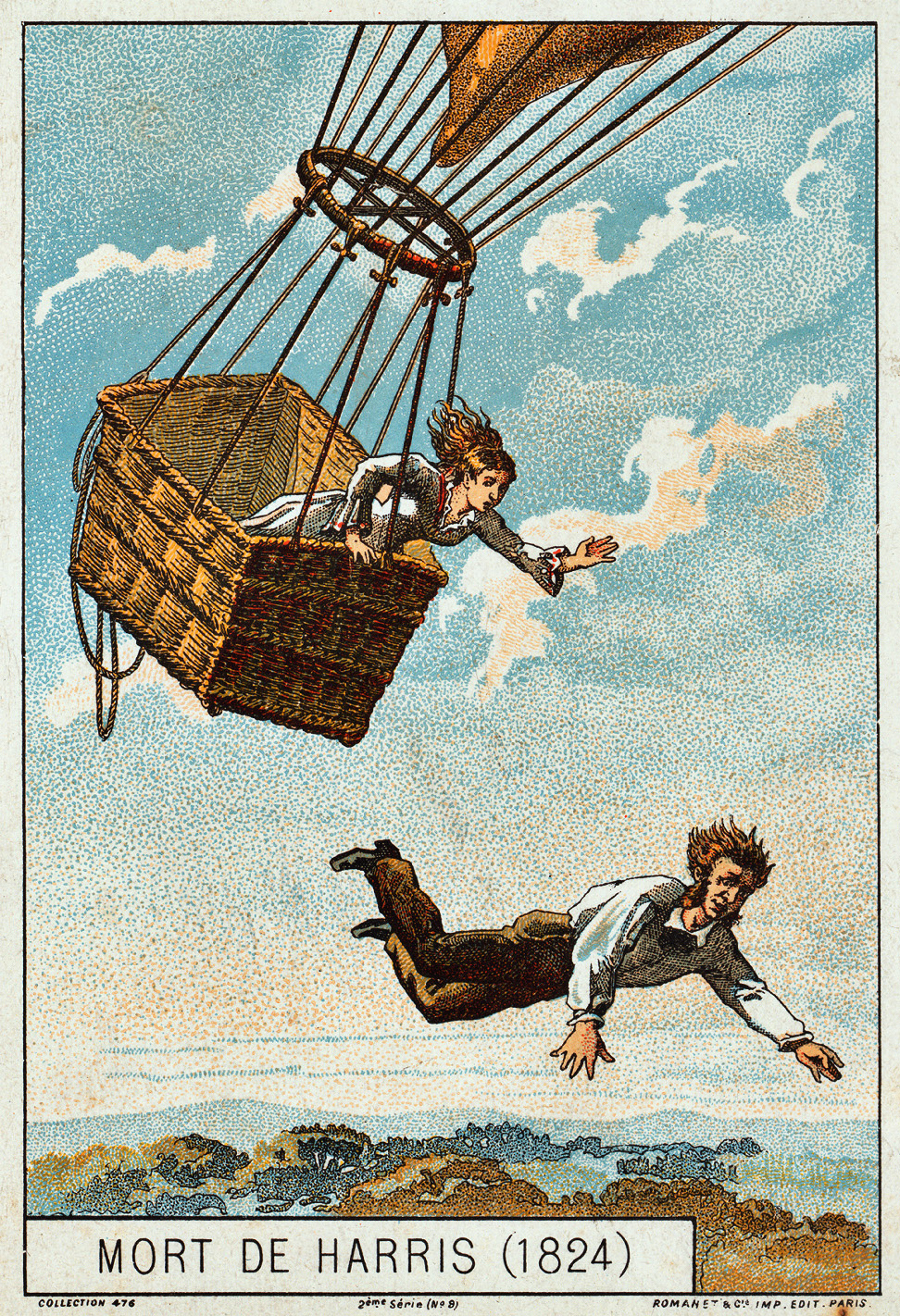
- Collecting card, portraying Harris falling to his death to save his companion.
- Born: England, United Kingdom
- Died: 25 May 1824; Vauxhall, London, England, United Kingdom
- Cause of death: Fall
- Known for: Death in a ballooning accident

Thomas Harris (died 25 May 1824) was a pioneering English balloonist who was killed in an accident. There is little information about his early career, but he invented the gas discharge valve, a device to release all the gas in a gas balloon to prevent the balloon from dragging after landing.

== Life ==
Thomas Harris was an inventive London scientist and held the military rank of Lieutenant. He exhibited a hydrogen balloon at the Royal Tennis Court in Great Windmill Street, Haymarket, in the spring of 1824. While not a professional aeronaut, he may have planned to become one.

In 1823, Harris made successful experiments on the River Thames with a view to preventing ships from being struck by lightning.

Harris invented the first mechanism for emptying a balloon canopy of gas or hot air, thus reducing the drag on landing. He designed a double valve, located at the top of the balloon bag, with a small valve fitted inside a larger one. One was for releasing the gases slowly, the other quickly. Harris commented that "The science of aerostation has lately fallen into much decay and been the subject of ridicule through the total want of invention".

== Death ==
Harris died while flying the balloon Royal George from Vauxhall, London, on 25 May 1824. An account of his death is given by L. T. C. Rolt, who states that it is likely that as gas gradually escaped from the balloon, the cord connecting the gas discharge valve to the gondola tightened, releasing more gas. In the resulting crash Harris was killed, and his travelling companion, an eighteen-year-old woman named Sophia Stocks "from the Haymarket", was badly injured.

From Vauxhall, the wind had carried the balloon towards Croydon, where it crashed into an oak tree at Beddington Park near Carshalton. The accident was later blamed on Harris's own valve.

The crash was observed by a gamekeeper, who gave evidence at the inquest:

He heard a report resembling distant thunder, and on looking up at the instant in the direction of the sound, saw the balloon descending with great velocity, striking the branch of a tree in its descent; and on proceeding to assist the sufferers, he found the Female almost in a state of insensibility, and Mr. Harris quite dead in the bottom of the car, with a black mark upon his neck.

Harris's companion, Miss Sophia Stocks, was described by journalists present as an intrepid girl and was reported to have got into the balloon's gondola "with but slight appearance of fear".

The coroner's jury brought in the finding that "death might have been occasioned by the broken ribs, &c."

According to a less plausible theory of the cause of the crash, the release valve got stuck in the open position, thus releasing the hydrogen. In an attempt to prevent the balloon falling, Harris threw out all the ballast and even the woman's clothes. In the end, he jumped to his death, making the balloon light enough to save his companion's life. She was later rescued from under the balloon; she sustained severe shock in the accident but no broken bones.

== Commemoration ==
A month after Harris's death a Mr Rossiter, described as a member of Harris's committee and an uncle of Mrs Harris, announced that on 1 July at the Bedford Arms Hotel, Camden Town, he would make a new ascent in Harris's balloon in order to raise funds for the dead man's widow and children. The Morning Chronicle of 5 July 1824 reported on the success of the ascent. The fields around the hotel were thronged with people who had come to see the balloon's departure.

The disaster on 25 May was commemorated in a late 19th-century collecting card set depicting historical events in ballooning and parachuting.
