= Théodore Sivel =

French aeronaut

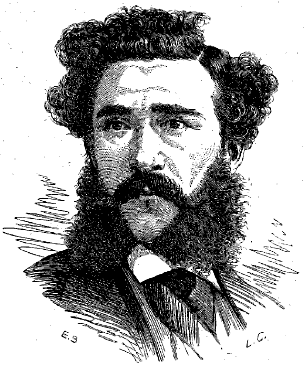
- Born: Théodore Henri Sivel; 10 November 1834; Sauve, Gard, France
- Died: 15 April 1875 (aged 40); Ciron, Indre, France
- Burial place: Père Lachaise Cemetery
- Occupations: Aeronaut, naval officer

Théodore Henri Sivel (10 November 1834 – 15 April 1875) was a French naval officer and aeronaut.

== Biography ==
The son of Alexandre Sivel and Caroline Brès—a Protestant family—Théodore Henri Sivel was born in the family home at Pignet, one kilometer southeast of Sauve.

At the age of 14, he set sail for distant seas and spent nearly twenty years at sea, circumnavigating the globe several times. He became a master mariner. He was a member of the French delegation that attended the coronation of Radama II, King of Madagascar.

Around 1866, the naval officer, drawn to air navigation, abandoned the sea in favor of the sky.

In 1867, he married Marie Poitevin in Bern; she died the following year in Naples.

He placed himself at the service of France during the Franco-Prussian War of 1870.

En 1872, il entre au service de la Société de Navigation aérienne de Paris et attire sur lui l'attention du monde scientifique en présentant son projet d'« exploration du pôle Nord en aérostat ». Il invente plusieurs accessoires de perfectionnement comme le guide-rope à flotteurs ou l'ancre-cône.. Il effectue près de 200 ascensions dont la première le 26 avril 1872. In 1872, he entered the service of the Paris Aerial Navigation Society and attracted the attention of the scientific community by presenting his project for "exploring the North Pole by balloon". He invented several devices for improvement, such as the float-equipped guide rope and the cone anchor. He undertook nearly 200 ascents, the first of which took place on April 26, 1872.

On March 22, 1874, alongside engineer Joseph Crocé-Spinelli, he made a balloon ascent (in the Étoile Polaire) reaching an altitude of 7,400 meters, traveling from the La Villette gasworks to Bar-sur-Seine. This ascent made it possible to test the use of oxygen (using equipment developed by Paul Bert) and to conduct astronomical observations—specifically, to determine whether the atmosphere affects observations of the sun and stars made from the ground—using an instrument built by Pierre Janssen.

On March 23 and 24, 1875, under the leadership of Paul Bert, he participated as captain in the Zénith's record-breaking endurance flight (22 hours 40 minutes) from Paris to Arcachon. This feat elevated the three aeronauts to the status of heroes.

On April 15, 1875, he set off in the same balloon—the Zénith—alongside Crocé-Spinelli and Gaston Tissandier, departing from near the gasworks in the La Villette district of Paris's 19th arrondissement. During this new ascent, which aimed to break the altitude record, he died at the age of 40 of asphyxiation (hypoxia) at Ciron, as did Crocé-Spinelli; only Tissandier survived. The disaster was determined to have been caused by a lack of precautions, their ignorance regarding the physiological effects of altitudes exceeding 8,000 meters, and the Zénith's excessively rapid rate of ascent. Tissandier himself recounted his and his friends' ordeal in the publications La Nature and L'Aéronaute. Maurice Dreyfous—who had been Tissandier’s publisher—wrote in a book of memoirs details about the Zénith disaster that Tissandier had previously withheld from the public. It emerged that it was Sivel, not Crocé-Spinelli, who was responsible for the balloon's sudden and fatal rise. Sivel, who was tasked with constantly monitoring the balloon's altitude via the barometer, was reportedly misled by his nearsightedness; he believed the reading at the aerostat indicated the balloon was about to touch the ground, and consequently threw everything within reach overboard.

At the time of his death, Sivel left behind Marie, an orphaned six-year-old girl. A national fundraising campaign raised nearly 10,000 francs for the bereaved families of the two fatalities.

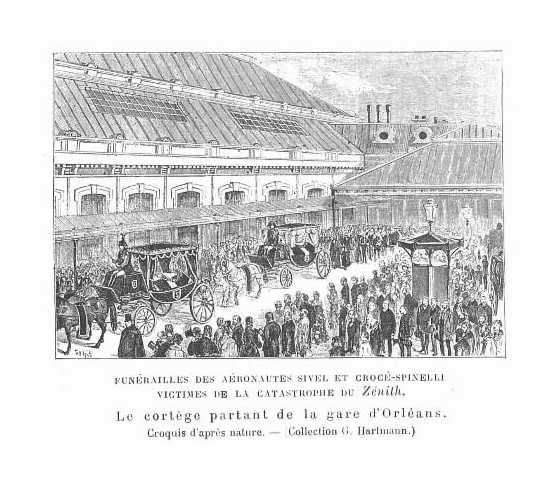
Funeral of the aeronauts Sivel and Crocé-Spinelli, April 20, 1875.

Acclaimed as heroes of science, Sivel and Crocé-Spinelli were honored in Paris with a funeral attended by over twenty thousand people; the procession moved from the Gare d'Orléans to Père Lachaise Cemetery, stopping at the Oratoire du Louvre church, where the ceremony was officiated by Pastor Dide. Sivel is buried in Section 71 beneath a recumbent effigy created in 1878 by the sculptor Alphonse Dumilatre, depicting him lying on his back while holding the hand of his ill-fated fellow aviator.

== Homages ==
- A street in the 14th arrondissement of Paris was named Rue Sivel in 1896.
- A memorial to the accident, designed by architect Albert Tissandier (brother of Gaston Tissandier), takes the form of a stone obelisk surrounded by a railing on Rue de l'Église Saint-Georges in Ciron.
- The town hall square in his native village bears his name; a plaque has been placed on the house where he was born.
- In 1975, a balloon was launched from the Sauve stadium to celebrate the centenary of the aeronaut's death.
