= Zénith (balloon) =

French gas balloon

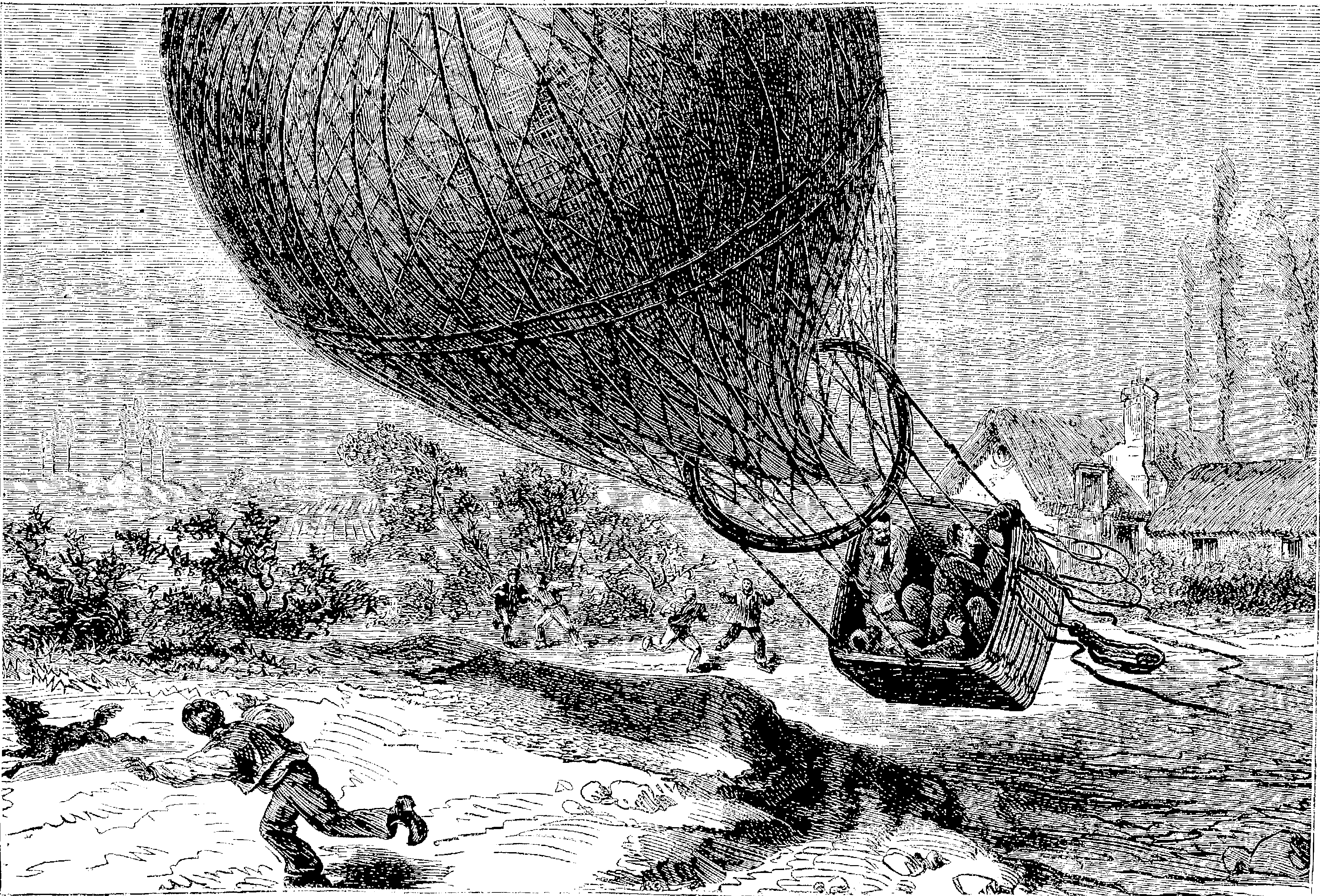
Fall of the Zénith at Ciron

The Zénith was a 3,000-cubic-meter gas balloon built in 1874 by Théodore Sivel and funded by the French Society for Aerial Navigation that set early flight altitude records, before causing the first altitude-related deaths of aeronauts in 1875 on a flight that cost the lives of Sivel and Joseph Crocé-Spinelli; a third crew member, Gaston Tissandier, survived.

== Construction ==
Designed by Théodore Sivel, the Zénith was assembled and sewn at Pignet—Sivel's family estate—with the help of women from Sauve, Gard, during 1874.

== Long-duration flight Paris–Arcachon ==
On 23 and 24 March 1875, under the auspices of Paul Bert, pilot Théodore Sivel, engineer Joseph Crocé-Spinelli, aeronaut Albert Tissandier, Albert's brother Gaston Tissandier (editor-in-chief of the journal La Nature), and Claude Jobert successfully completed a long-duration flight (24 hours 40 minutes), breaking all duration records. The balloon ascended from Paris at 4:20 p.m. and landed the following day at 5:00 p.m. in Arcachon.

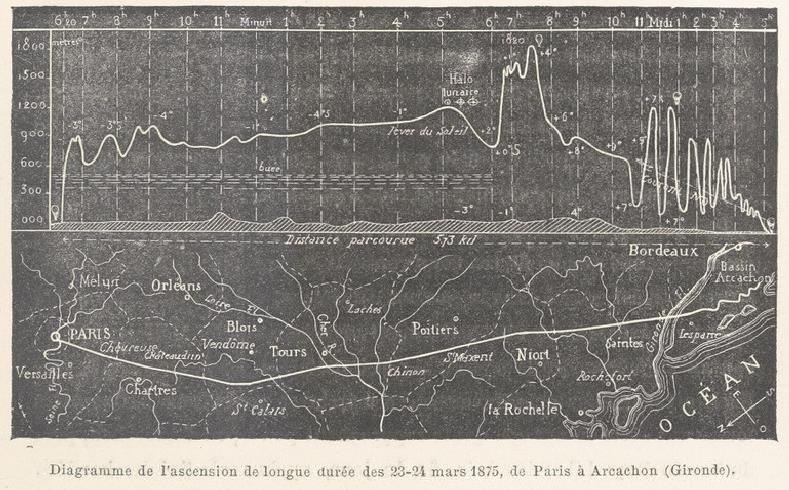
Flight diagram from Paris to Arcachon, 23–24 March 1875

Starting from the La Villette gasworks—currently located at 159 Boulevard Macdonald in Paris—the flight ended in the commune of Lanton, Gironde. This flight gave rise to numerous scientific observations, notably by Crocé-Spinelli, who was responsible for spectroscopic observations; the Tissandier brothers, who studied the chemical composition of the air at high altitude and measured the proportions of gases and water vapor in the rarefied air; and Sivel, who handled the balloon's navigation and assisted his companions with their experiments.

== Second flight and Ciron tragedy ==
=== Overview ===
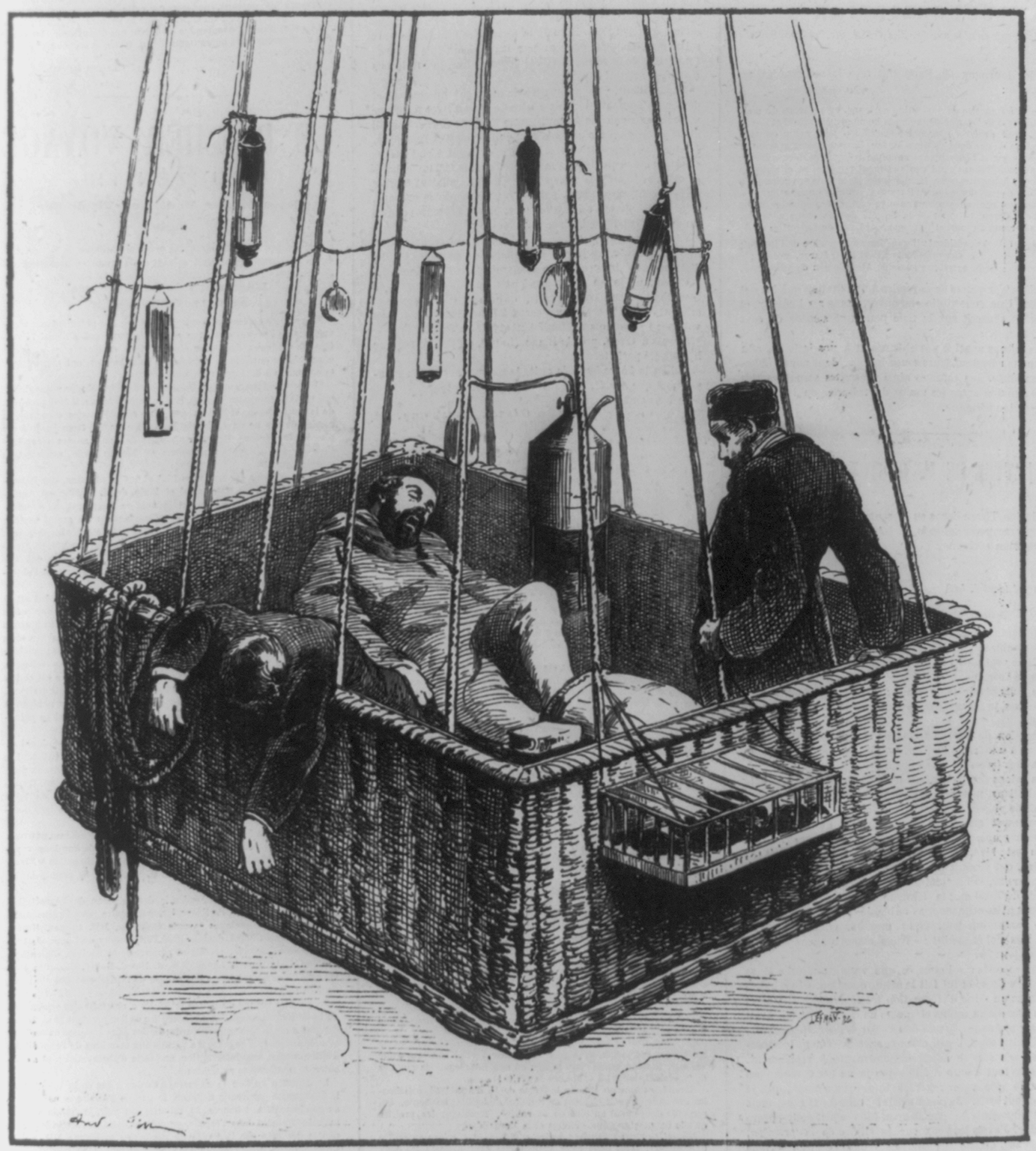
Sketch depicting Crocé-Spinelli and Sivel, having lost consciousness due to a lack of oxygen, and Tissandier, in the basket of the Zénith on 15 April 1875

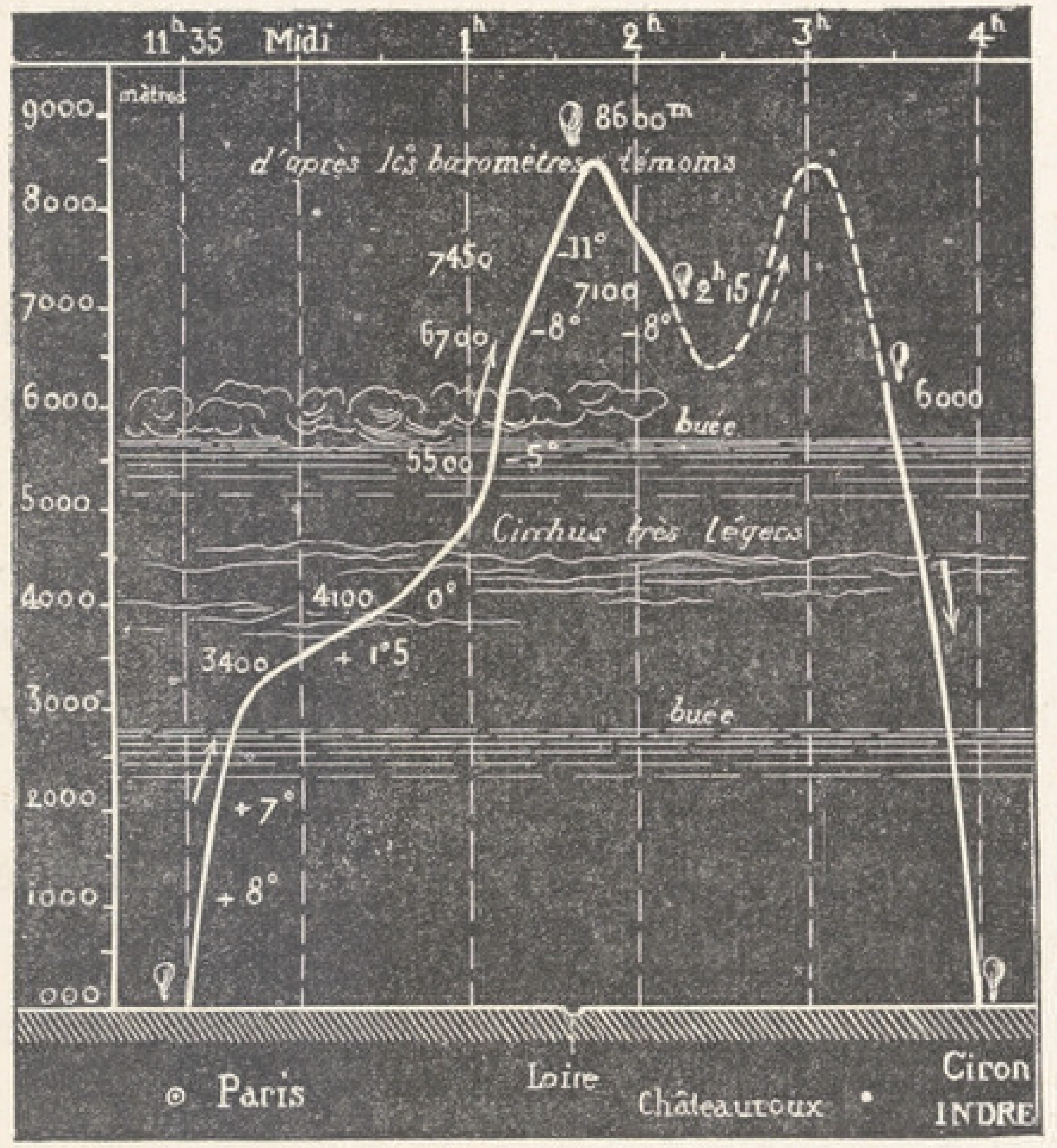
Diagram of the ascent from Paris to Ciron, Indre

After the Zenith balloon was inflated under the supervision of Adrien Duté-Poitevin—Sivel's brother-in-law—three aeronauts (Sivel, Crocé-Spinelli, and Tissandier) took off in the balloon near the La Villette gasworks in the 19th arrondissement of Paris at 11:35 a.m. on 15 April 1875, hoping to break the altitude record (8,800 meters at the time) and conduct observations.

Despite feeling unwell once they reached an altitude of 8,000 meters, the three aeronauts decided to continue their ascent (flight recorders showed they reached 8,600 meters). They all lost consciousness due to a lack of oxygen (hypoxia). Only Tissandier managed to regain his senses in time to slow the descent; the balloon made a rough landing, tearing open against a tree—though the basket remained largely intact—at 4:00 p.m. that afternoon in Ciron, Indre, near Le Blanc, 250 km from Paris. Tissandier was the sole survivor—though he partially lost his hearing—and he personally recounted his and his companions' ordeal in La Nature on 1 May 1875, and in L'Aéronaute the following month.

The physiological effects of altitudes exceeding 8,000 meters were largely unknown at the time—even though James Glaisher's 1862 experience offered some clues, the British aeronaut was experienced and had survived his high-altitude flight. Furthermore, a letter from Paul Bert warning them of the need for larger oxygen supplies (theirs consisted of three small rubber bags containing 70% oxygen, sufficient for at most one hour of breathing) failed to reach them in time. The Zénith's excessively rapid ascent played a major role in the disaster. Maurice Dreyfous—Gaston Tissandier’s publisher—wrote in his memoirs that the Tissandier had confided details about the Zénith disaster that he had previously deliberately withheld from the public. It emerged that it was Sivel, not Crocé-Spinelli, who had caused the balloon's sudden, fatal ascent. Sivel, who was responsible for constantly monitoring the balloon's altitude on the barometer, was apparently misled by his nearsightedness into believing the craft was about to touch the ground; consequently, he threw everything within reach overboard.

In all drawings of the disaster, the actual shape of the Zénith's gondola has been replaced by a square gondola of less crude and more advantageous construction. The authentic gondola was kept at the Conservatoire for a time before being sold.

=== Impact and tributes ===
News of the disaster caused a stir in France and abroad, and more than twenty thousand people followed the funeral procession for Sivel and Crocé-Spinelli from the gare d'Orléans to the Père Lachaise Cemetery in Paris.

==== Monument ====
A public collect was launched by the French Aerial Navigation Society to assist the victims' families and to erect a commemorative monument at the site where the balloon landed. Designed by architect Albert Tissandier (brother of Gaston), the monument takes the form of a stone obelisk enclosed by a railing and is located on Rue de l'Église Saint-Georges in Ciron. It was inaugurated on 25 March 1881, and subsequently designated a historical monument by an order dated 4 April 2017.

==== Performance venues ====
French concert venues known as Le Zénith are named after the balloon. In 1981, Jack Lang—then Minister of Culture—decided to create a large-capacity venue located outside city centers, designed for rock and popular music; he launched the "Zénith" concept with the Zénith Paris, replacing the Pavillon de Paris. The first venue was built at the Parc de la Villette on the very spot where the balloon had taken off, as the Minister of Culture had drawn inspiration from that feat when naming the structure.

==== Tomb ====
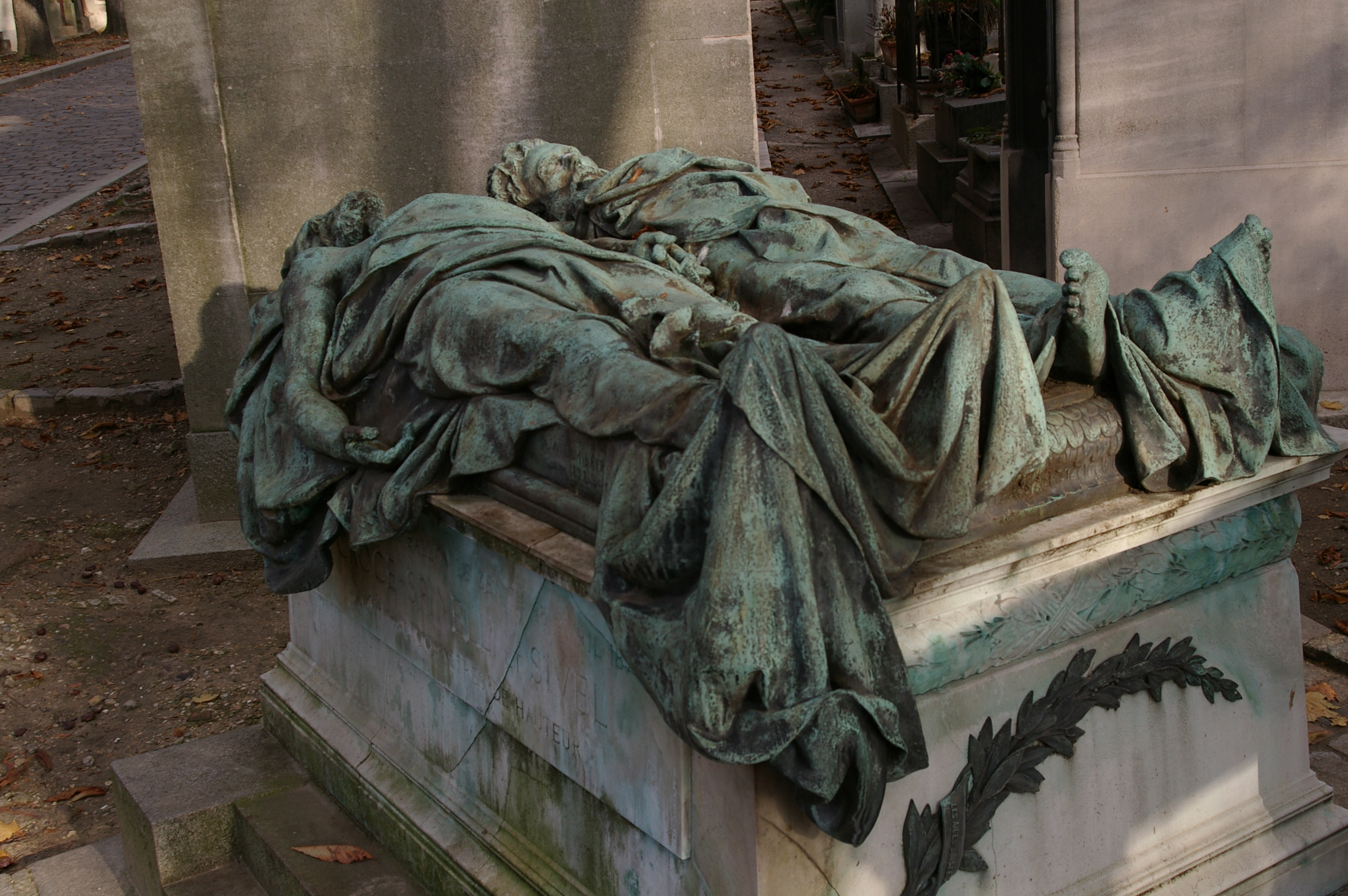
Tomb of Joseph Crocé-Spinelli and Theodore Sivel.

The remains of Joseph Crocé-Spinelli and Théodore Sivel were laid to rest in a single tomb, surmounted by their recumbent effigies lying on their backs, side by side with their hands clasped together. This monument, located in the Père Lachaise Cemetery in Paris (71st Division), was built in 1878 and is the work of the artist Alphonse Dumilatre, who depicted them exactly as witnesses to the Zénith crash reported finding them.

==== Street name ====
Two streets in the 14th arrondissement of Paris—Rue Crocé-Spinelli and Rue Sivel—pay tribute to the two victims of the aviation disaster.

==== Stage plays and musicals ====
Musical scores (for voice and instrument) related to the theatre were published shortly after the disaster—such as those titled Le Zénith (lyrics by Adolphe Perreau, music by Robert Planquette) or Les martyrs du Zénith, a historical scene (lyrics by Julien Fauque, music by Jules Jacob), which remained on sale until 1901.

==== Poem ====
The ascent and the resulting tragedy inspired a poem titled Le Zénith by the French poet Sully Prudhomme, who would go on to become the first-ever recipient of the Nobel Prize in Literature.

== See also ==
- History of ballooning
- List of flight altitude records
