= Stanislas Limousin =

French pharmacist

Euphrasie Stanislas Alexis Arsène Limousin (29 May 1831 – 7 April 1887) was a French pharmacist who invented hypodermic ampoules and the oxygen bottle amongst several other pharmaceutical devices.

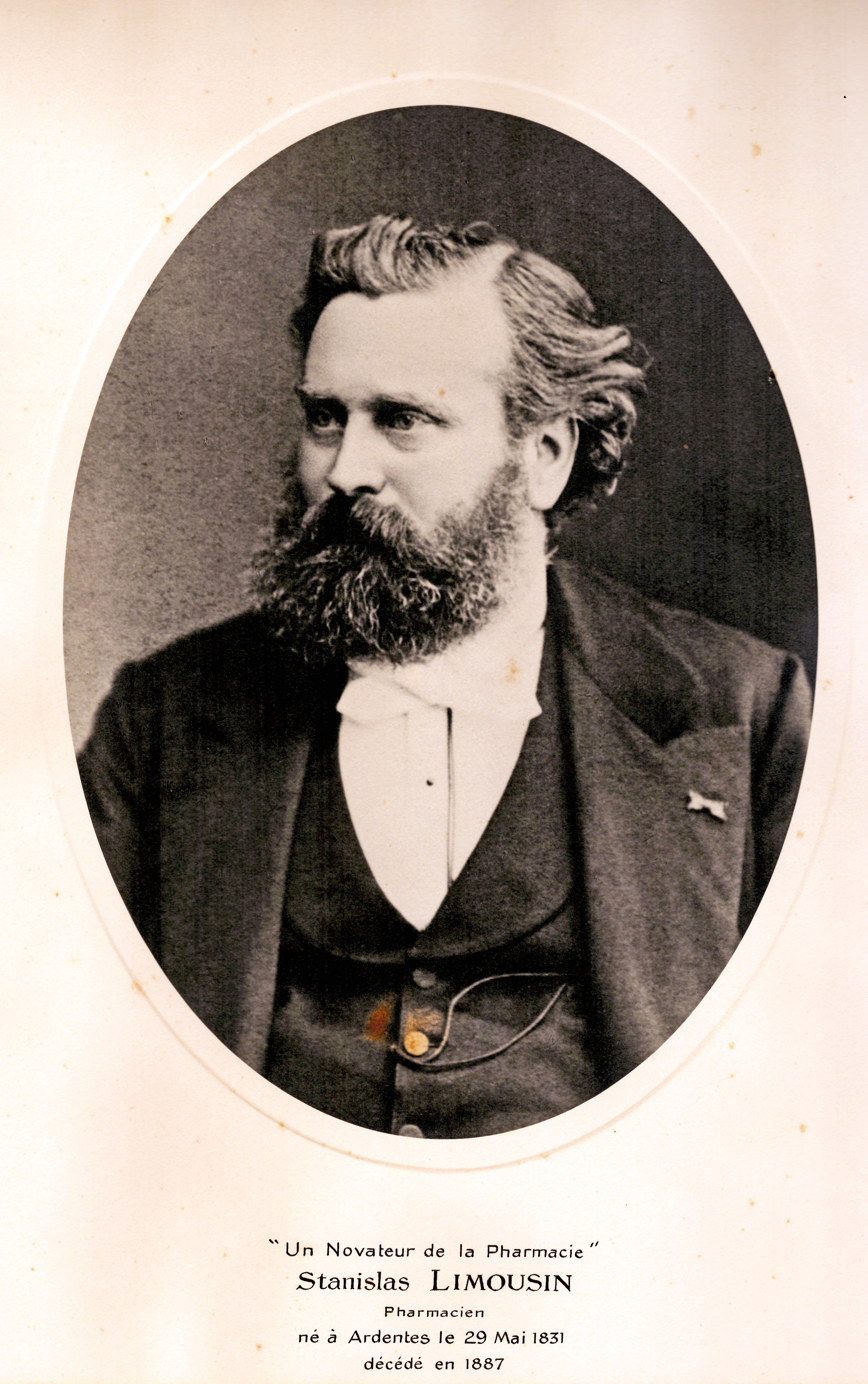
Stanislas Limousin

== Early life ==
Stanislas Limousin was born at Ardentes in the Indre department of France.

While studying as an intern at the Pitié Salpetrière hospital in Paris in 1856, Limousin bought a small pharmacy located at 2 bis rue Blanche, on the place de la Trinité in the 9th arrondissement of Paris. The pharmacy grew quickly and he eventually bequeathed it to his son-in-law Henri Bocquillon-Limousin (1856–1917), who married Limousins' daughter in 1885, and wrote the Manuel des plantes médicinales coloniales et exotiques.

== Pharmaceutical innovations ==
Many of Limousin's innovations advanced the delivery of medication to the patient and included several that are still in use today:

=== Oxygen inhalation apparatus ===
English chemist Joseph Priestley discovered oxygen in 1774, describing it as "five or six times better than common air for the purpose of respiration, inflammation, and, I believe, every other use of common atmospherical air". However, little pharmaceutical use was made of it until the 1860s, when Limousin invented an oxygen inhalation device, the forerunner of the oxygen extractors now used in therapy.

Limousin was involved in the ascension of the Zénith, a balloon flown to a record altitude of over 8,000 meters in 1875. During the flight hypoxia killed the French Navy officer Théodore Henri Sivel and the journalist Joseph Crocé-Spinelli, but left scientist Gaston Tissandier only deaf, because he managed to breathe oxygen at altitude. Victor Robinson, Professor of the History of Medicine, indicates that "the oxygen apparatus was arranged by the competent pharmacist Limousin, according to the proportions indicated by Paul Bert".

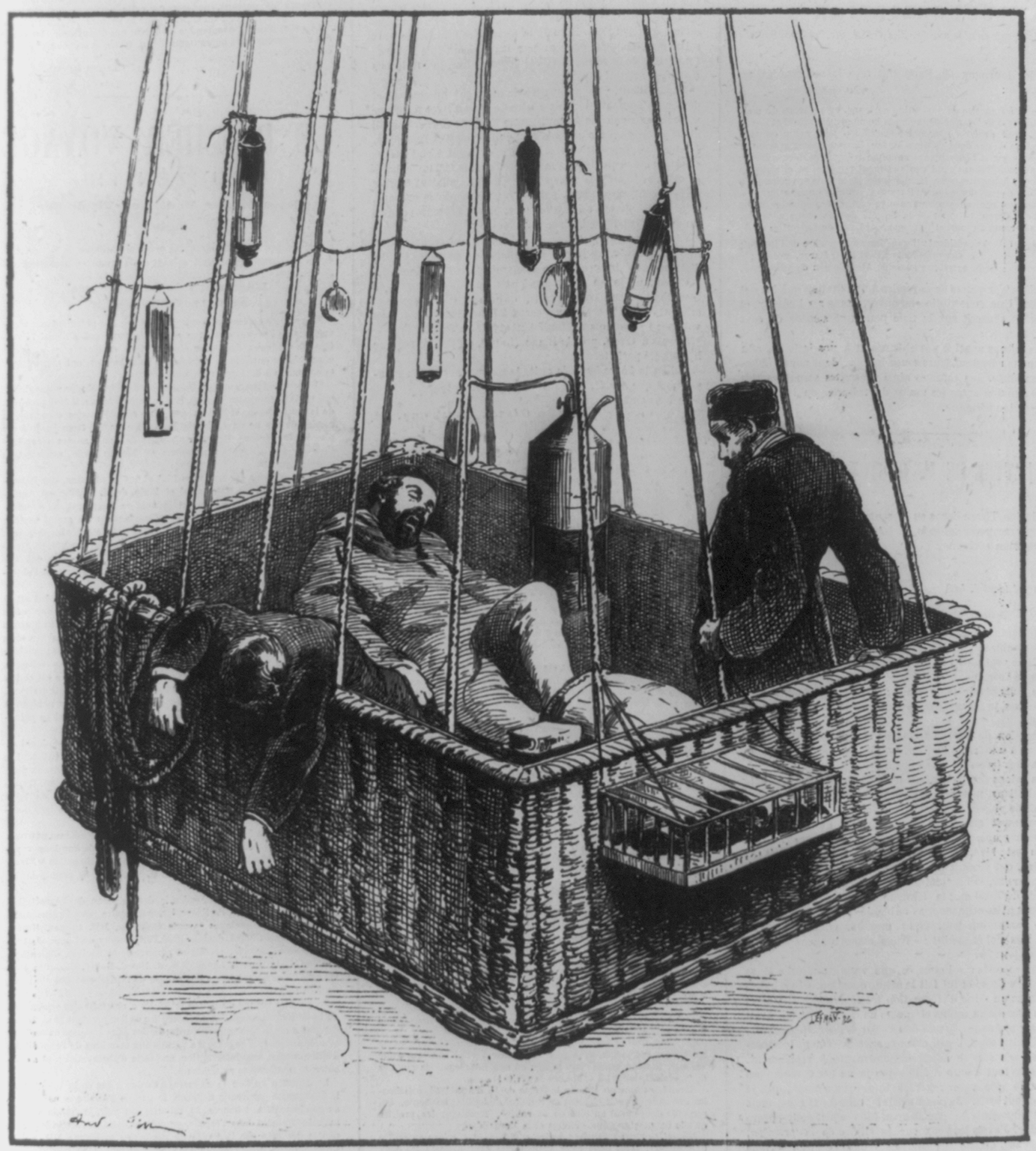
Illustration of the basket of the Zénith

=== Wafer cachets ===
In 1873 Limousin presented the idea of making wafers of rice starch, to wrap powdered medication, helping to deliver unpleasant tasting medicines. These were made using a process called the Procédé Limousin. They represent a beginning of modern industrial pharmaceutical manufacture, before the advent of gelatin capsules and the mass adoption of the tablet medicine delivery format.

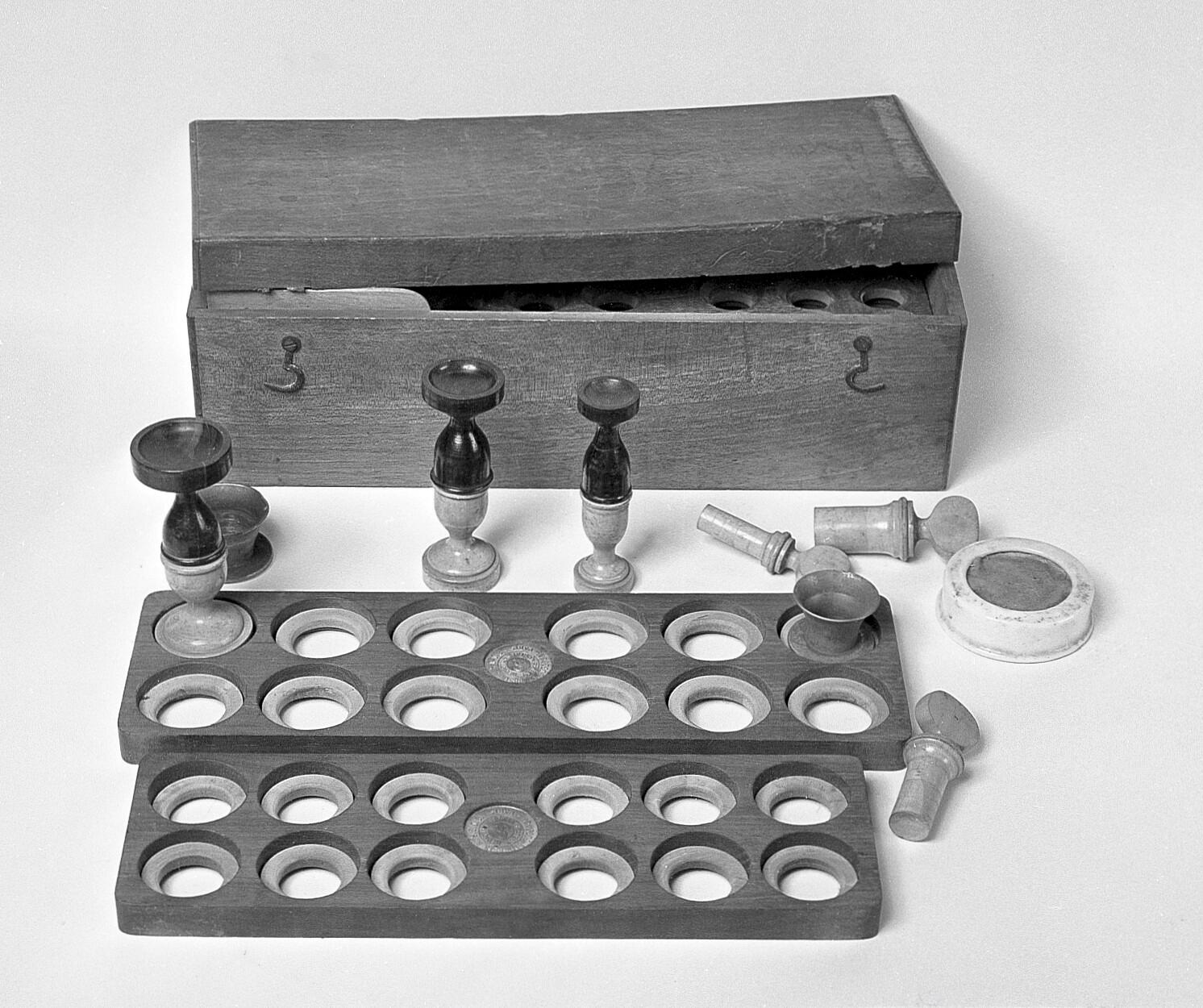
Equipment of the Procédé Limousin

=== Medicine dropper ===
Limousin designed the eye dropper or 'compte-goute' (drop counter), while working with Louis Pasteur on several projects. Once called French pipettes they are now often called Pasteur pipettes.

=== Hypodermic ampoule ===
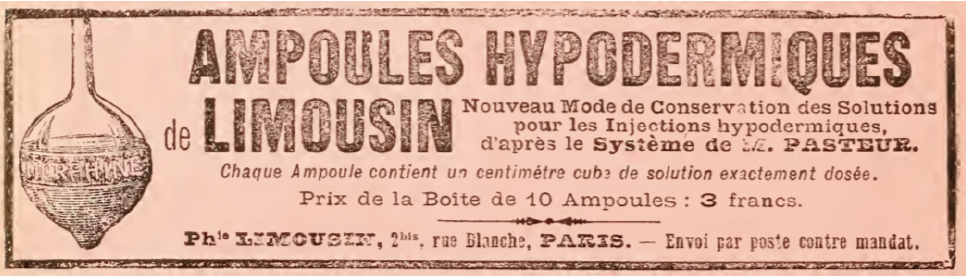
Limousin ampoule box label

The glass ampoule seals and preserves sterilised solutions to be injected by hypodermic needle. The importance of intravenous injection as a means of drug administration is clear, but Limousin did not see live to see its adoption.

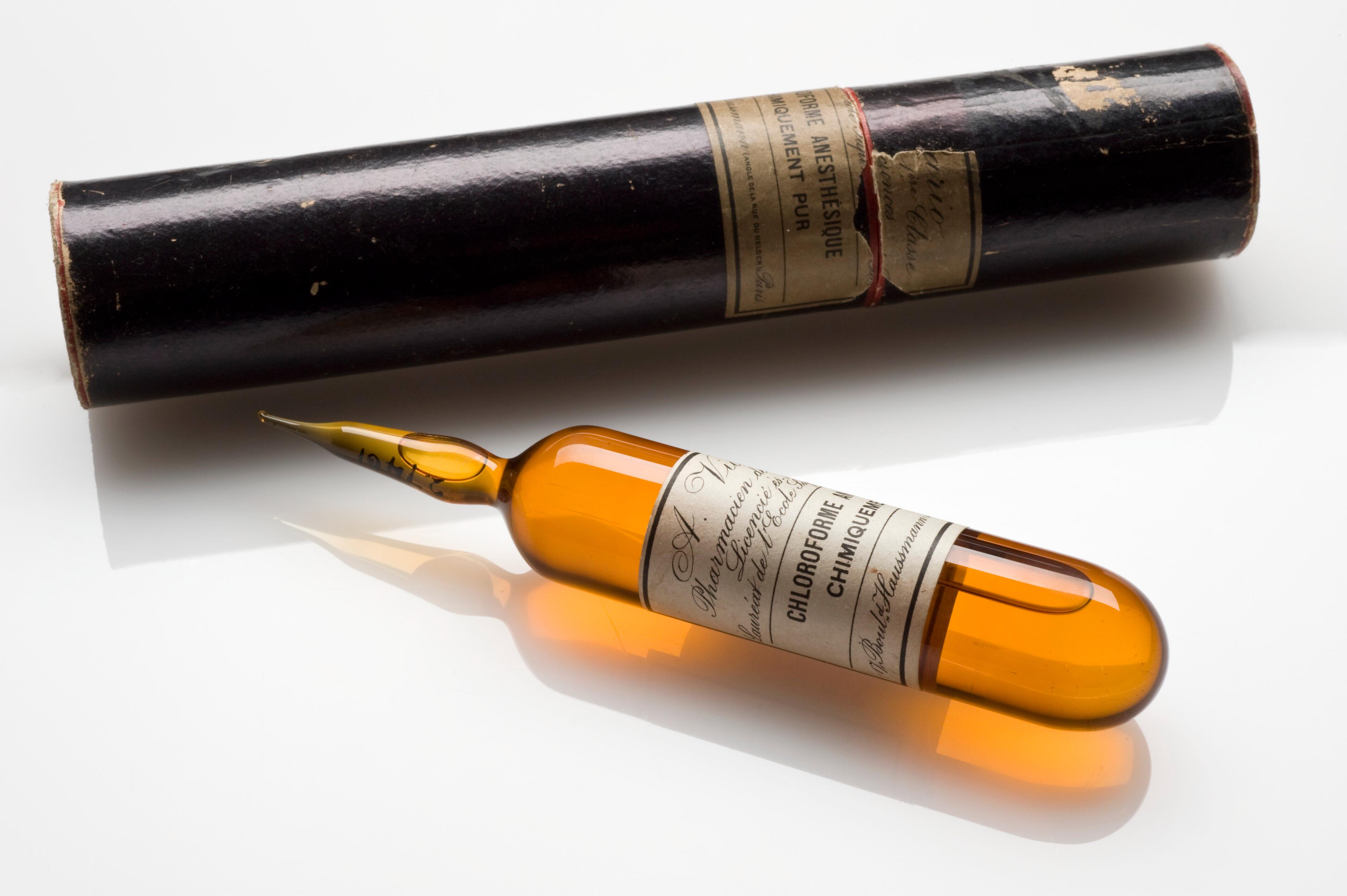
Glass ampoule

== Later life ==
Limousin was a member of the Société de Pharmacie, which was to become the Académie Nationale de Pharmacie, and he was president of the Société de Médecine pratique and the Société de Thérapeutique.

He was made Chevalier de la Légion d'honneur (1878).

== Writings ==
- Note sur les inhalations d'oxygène (1866)
- Du sucre-tisane (1875), with Eugène Lebaigue and Émile Delpech.
- Contributions à la pharmacie et à la thérapeutique (1879).
