= Joseph Crocé-Spinelli =

French aeronaut, engineer, and inventor

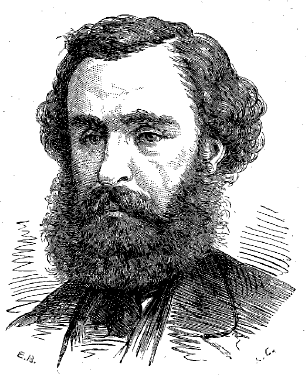
- Born: Joseph Eustache Crocé-Spinelli; 10 July 1845; Monbazillac, France
- Died: 15 April 1875 (aged 29); Ciron, Indre, France
- Burial place: Père Lachaise Cemetery
- Occupations: Aeronaut, engineer, inventor

Joseph Eustache Crocé-Spinelli (10 July 1845 – 15 April 1875) was a French engineer, aeronaut, and inventor, who was a pioneer of ballooning. Together with Théodore Sivel and Gaston Tissandier, he reached a record altitude of 8,600 meters in the balloon Zénith; however, the voyage resulted in the deaths of Crocé-Spinelli and Sivel from hypoxia.

== Life and career ==
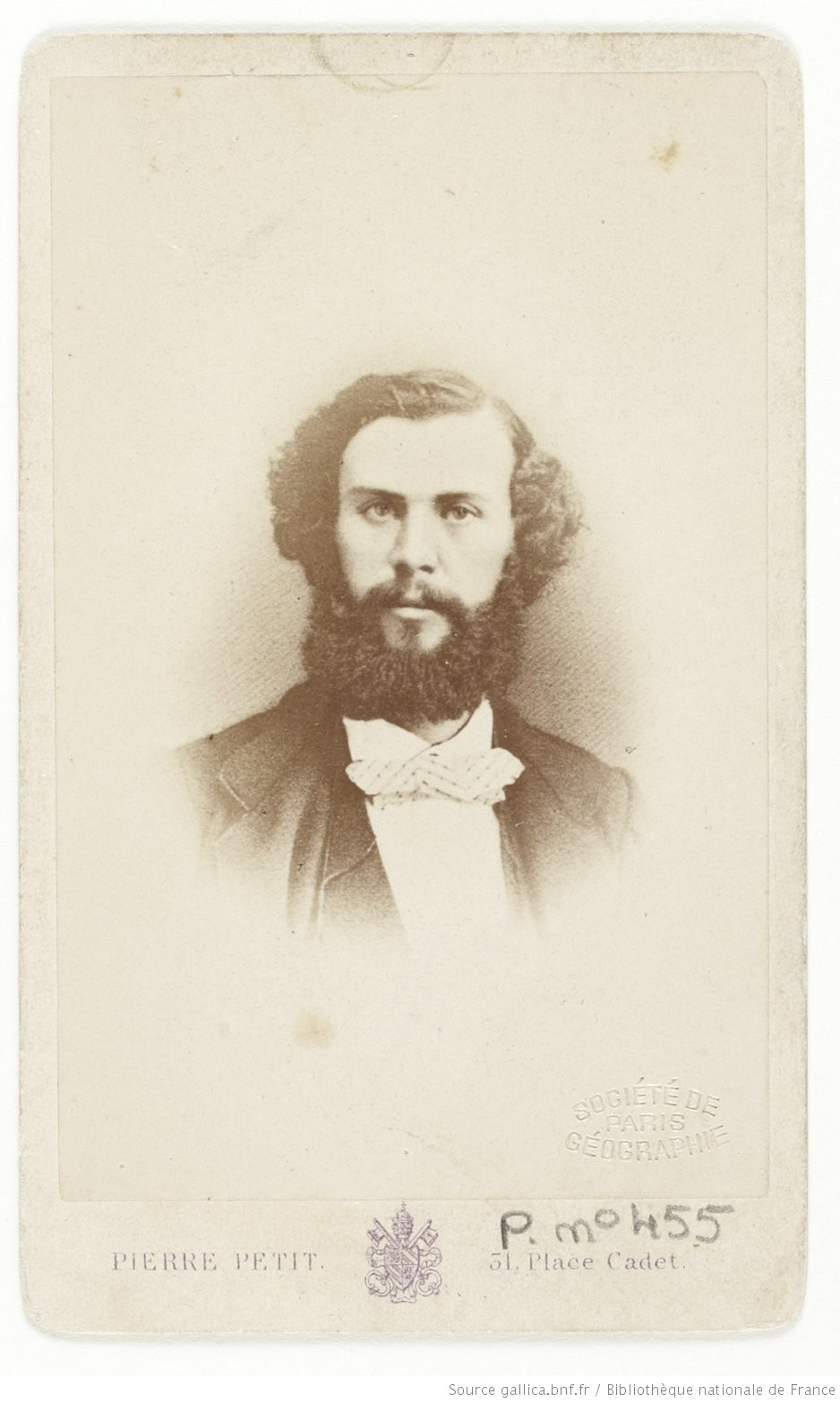
Photograph of Joseph Crocé-Spinelli (taken by Pierre Petit)

Joseph Crocé-Spinelli was born on 10 July 1845, in the town of Monbazillac, in the French region of Nouvelle-Aquitaine, at the family estate of the jeweler Isidore-Achille Crocé-Spinelli and Marie-Louise Lacour. He had a brother, Raphaël Crocé-Spinelli, and one of his cousins was the French composer Bernard Crocé-Spinelli.

He studied at the Lycée Bonaparte in Paris and obtained a degree in literature and natural sciences. In 1864, he entered the École Centrale des Arts et Manufactures, where he studied until 1867.

In 1870–1871, Croce-Spinelli was an active participant in the Franco-Prussian War and served in the 221st Battalion of the French Army.

After the war, he engaged in scientific work, writing and publishing several articles on mechanics in the French newspaper République Française. Later, he became interested in aeronautics and joined the newly established Société Française de Navigation Aérienne (French Society for Aerial Navigation). He played an active role in the publication of the scientific journal L'Aéronaute.

Between 1873 and 1875, he undertook four high-altitude balloon flights in the L'Étoile polaire ("The Polar Star") and Zénith ("Zenith").

== Death ==
Inspired by the success of their record-breaking flight from Paris to Arcachon, Crocé-Spinelli, Sivel, and Tissandier immediately began preparing for a new expedition. The goal of this new flight in the Zénith was to reach the highest possible altitude in a balloon; the scientists prepared their equipment with this objective in mind.

On the balloon, near the hanging ring of the basket, three small cylinders with an oxygen mixture for breathing, which contained 70 percent oxygen, were installed. Two aneroid barometers were placed on ropes that ran from the basket to the ring. One recorded the pressure at an altitude of up to 4,000 meters, the other at an altitude of 4,000 to 9,000 meters. Several thermometers were placed next to them, one of which, could record low temperatures down to -40 degrees. Above the thermometers, in a closed box filled with sawdust, a special barometer was installed to record the maximum height of the balloon's ascent. This device consisted of 8 barometric tubes with mercury and was developed by the French astronomer and scientist Pierre Janssen. Sivel attached a thick mattress tightly stuffed with straw to the bottom of the basket to cushion the impact on the ground during the balloon's descent.

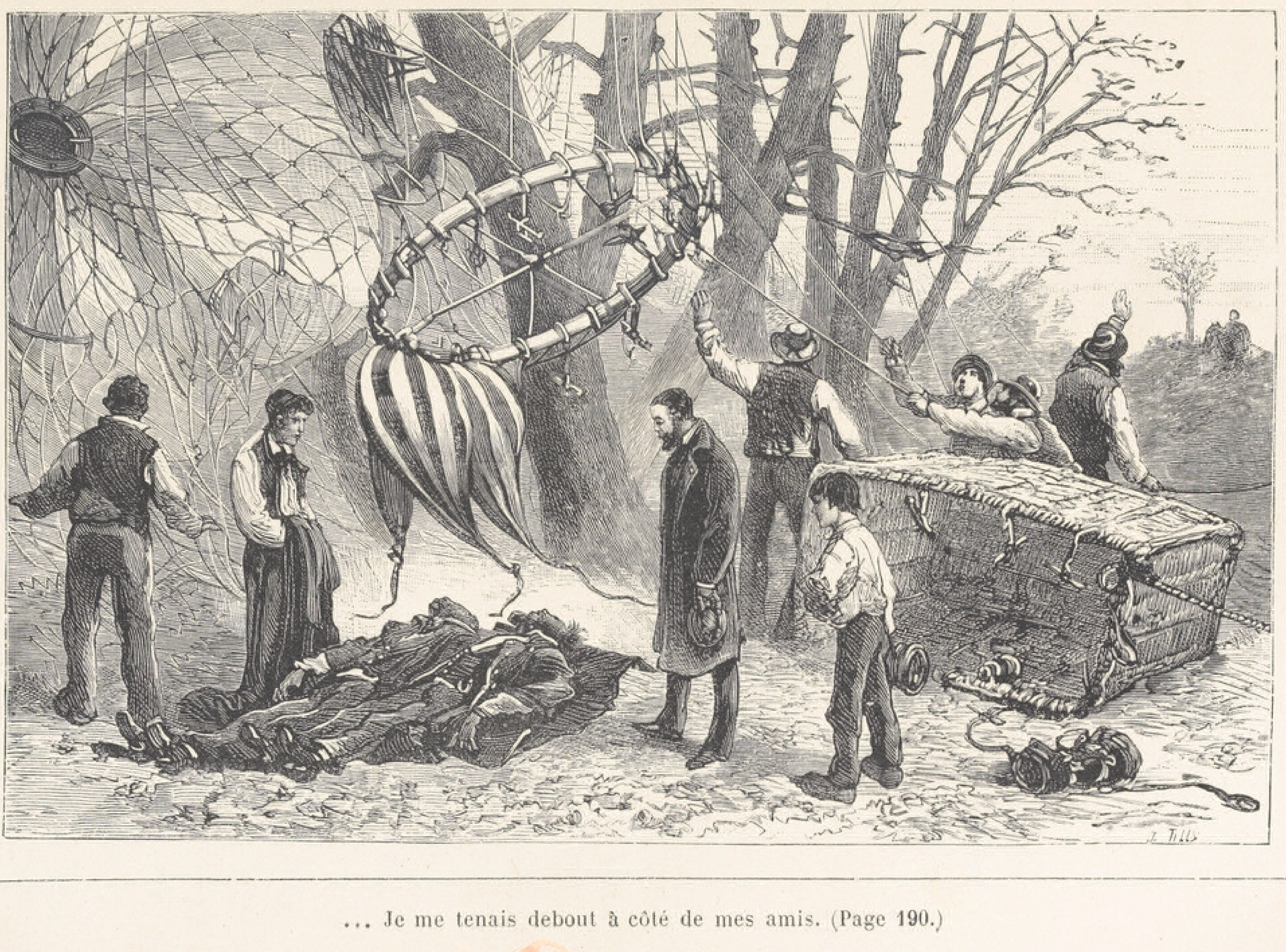
At the site of the Zénith balloon crash, 15 April 1875, Ciron, Indre, France

On 15 April 1875, at 11:52 a.m., the Zénith, with Croce-Spinelli, Sivel, and Tissandier on board, lifted off the ground and began its ascent. Gaston Tissandier later recalled that at an altitude of 1,000 feet (300 meters), Theodore Sivel exclaimed joyfully: "Well, here we are, friends! Look at our Zénith - how beautiful it is!"

At an altitude of 3,300 meters, a large volume of hydrogen suddenly burst from the balloon's "appendix", which was located directly above the heads of the aeronauts, and heated up in the warm spring sun. This did not affect Sivel and Tissandier in any way, but Crocé-Spinelli made the following entry in his diary:

"11 h. 57 min., H. 500., Temperature +1, slight pain in the ears. A little depressed. It's gas."

Busy with their scientific observations, the aeronauts did not pay attention to the reaction of their own bodies to the lack of oxygen. But at an altitude of 5,300 meters, the highly rarefied air was already making itself felt, and Tissandier, checking on the condition of his friends, left the following entry in his notebook:

"Crocé - pulse 120 beats per minute, Sivel - 150 beats"

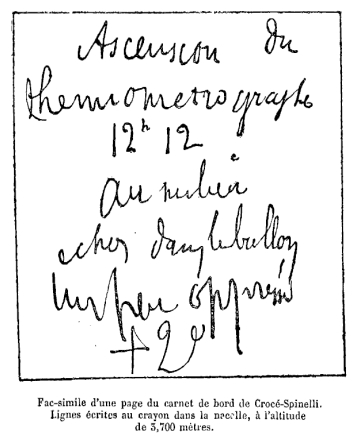
The page from Crocé-Spinelli's diary with his last entry, made at an altitude of 3,700 meters

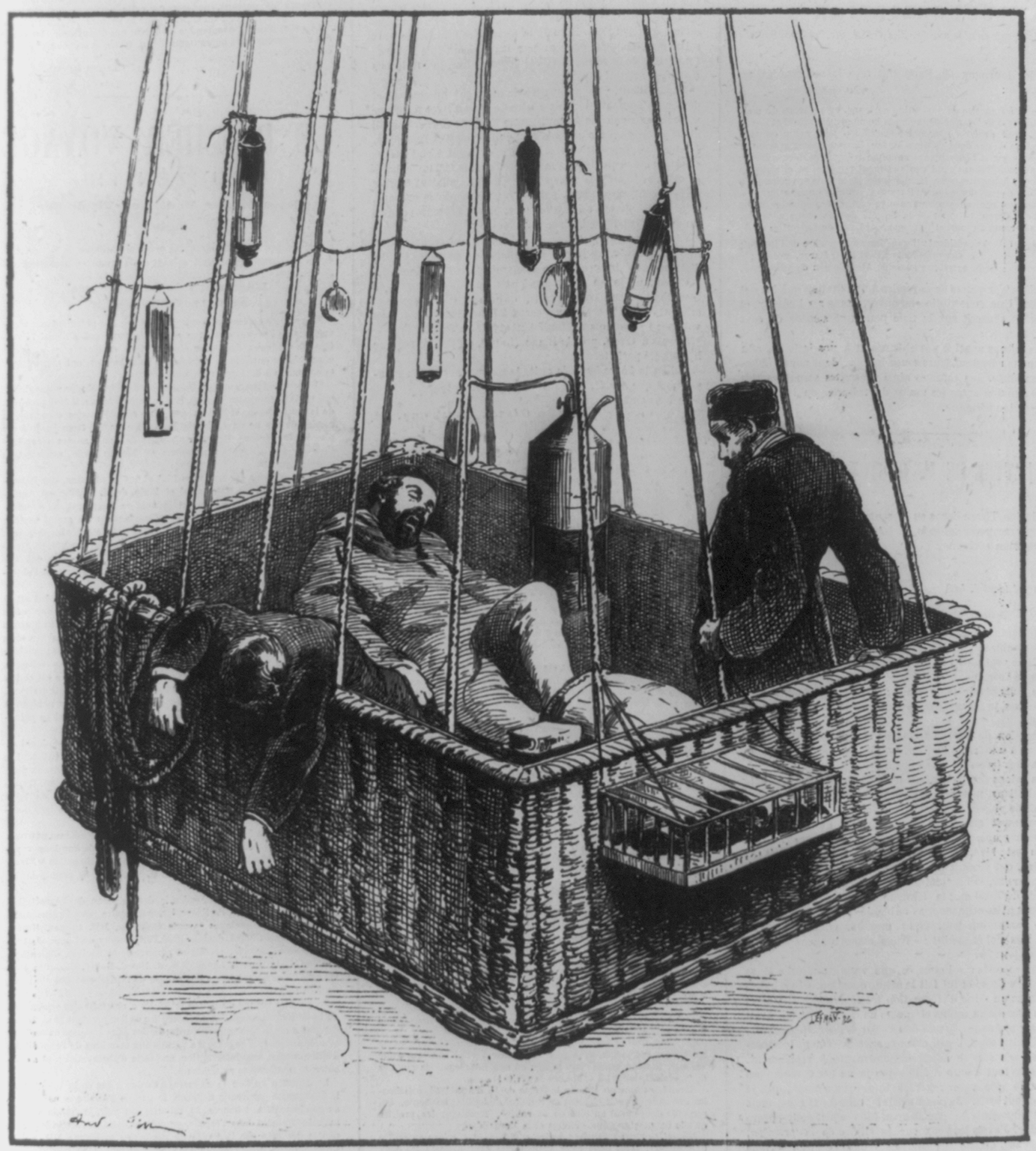
Joseph Crocé-Spinelli, Theodore Sivel and Gaston Tissandier in the Zénith basket after passing out due to lack of oxygen at an altitude of more than 8,000 meters (picture from Tissandier's book The History of My Flights, 1878)

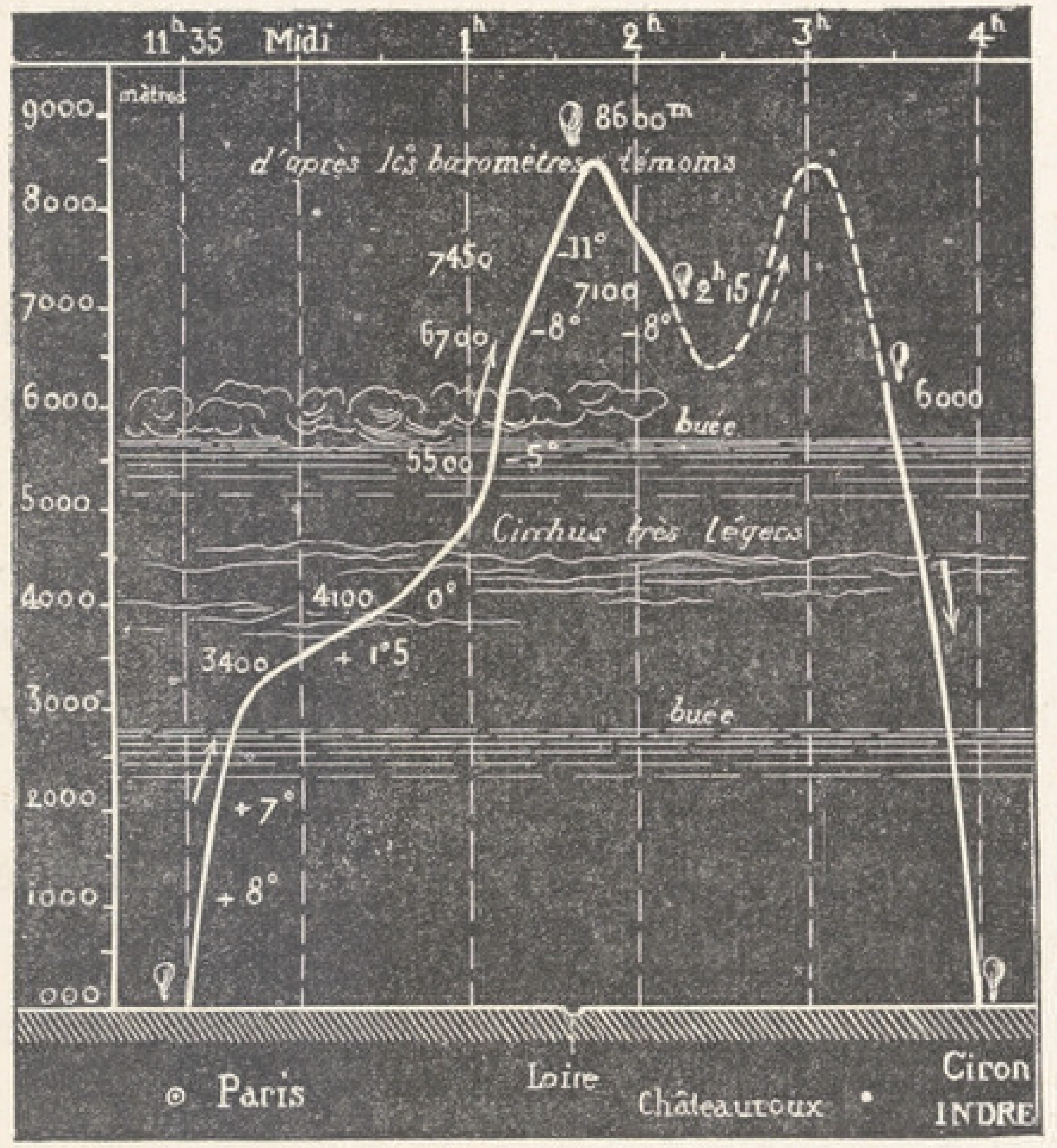
Diagram of the Zénith flight route from Paris to Siron, 15 April 1875

At about 1:00 p.m., the Zénith reached an altitude of 7,000 meters and drifted above cirrus clouds consisting of small scattered particles of ice. Suffering from lack of air, Tissandier inhaled a few sips of oxygen mixture, feeling how the oxygen has a healing effect on him. Shivering from the cold, he wrote in an uneven handwriting:

"My hands are numb. I feel good. There is fog and small, round, cirrus clouds on the horizon. We are climbing. Crocé is breathing heavily. We are breathing in oxygen. Sivel closed his eyes. Crocé also closed his eyes...the temperature is 10...Sivel is shedding ballast...Sivel is shedding ballast again."

Later, Tissandier recalled that somewhere at an altitude of 7,500 meters, Sivel asked him twice whether to dump some more ballast and, having received the answer "do whatever you want", cut off several more sandbags. Crocé-Spinelli at this time was sitting at the bottom of the basket, holding the tube from the oxygen cylinder in his hand and looking very depressed. Tissandier describes further events as follows:

"Soon I was overcome with such weakness that I could not even turn my head to look at my friends. I wanted to grab the oxygen hose, but I could not raise my hands. However, my head still continued to work. I did not stop watching the barometer, and as before, I did not take my eyes off the needle, which soon approached the number 290, then 280 millimeters and began to go beyond it. I wanted to shout: 'We are at an altitude of 8000 meters!', but my speech seemed to be paralyzed. Suddenly, my eyes closed, and I fell unconscious. This happened at about 1 hour 30 minutes. At 2 hours 8 minutes I came to my senses for a minute. The bullet was rapidly descending. I had enough strength to cut the rope of the ballast bag, slow down the descent, and write down the following lines: 'We are descending, temperature - 8 degrees, I am dropping ballast, pressure 315. We are descending. Sivel and Croce are still unconscious at the bottom of the basket. We are descending very quickly.' I had barely managed to write these lines when I was seized by a tremor, and I fell again without strength. The wind was blowing strongly from bottom to top. This indicated a very rapid descent. A few minutes later I felt someone shaking my hand, and I recognized Croce. He came to his senses. 'Drop the ballast,' he told me, 'we are descending.' But I could only open my eyes, and then with incredible effort. I remember that Croce unhooked the aspirator, it weighed 17 kilograms, and threw it overboard (later the aspirator fell to the ground in the town of Courmemen and almost killed a woman with two children who were resting in nature). Then Croce emptied the ballast bag, threw away the blanket and some other things. But I remember all this extremely poorly and this is where further memories end, because I lost consciousness again, this time for a long time. It seemed to me that I was falling into an eternal sleep."

After Croce-Spinelli dropped some ballast, the Zenith slowed its descent again and slowly climbed to a height of over 8,000 meters for the second time. At 3:30 p.m. Tissandier regained consciousness, feeling very dizzy and weak. Opening his eyes, he saw that the ball was again descending at a terrible speed. The basket was swinging violently and describing large circles in the air.

Tissandier crawled to his friends on his knees and attempted to wake them up, but they lay motionless at the bottom of the basket. Gathering the last of his strength, Tissandier tried to lift them to their feet, but the faces of the aeronauts were already dark, their eyes were cloudy, and their mouths were bloody. Tissandier recalls the following about the last minutes of the Zénith flight:

"I felt a terrible wind coming from below upwards. We were still at an altitude of 7,000 meters. There were two more bags of ballast left in the basket, which I threw out. Soon the land came closer and I wanted to grab a knife to cut the anchor line, but I couldn't find it. I was like crazy, I kept shouting: 'Sivel! Sivel!' Fortunately, I was able to take up a knife and unhook the anchor. The impact on the ground was extremely strong. It seemed that the balloon had flattened, and I thought it would not move any more, but the wind was very strong and quickly carried it away. The anchor did not work, and the basket was dragged across the field. The bodies of my unfortunate friends shook here and there. I thought they would fall out of the basket at any moment. However, I was able to grab the release rope, and soon the balloon was empty of gas, and then it hit a tree and burst. It was four o'clock in the afternoon..."

The Zénith crashed in a field near the town of Ciron, Indre, located 250 km from Paris. A check of the data of a special high-altitude barometer took place in the Sorbonne physics laboratory and showed that the maximum height reached by the Zénith during its flight was from 8,540 to 8,600 meters. Crocé-Spinelli and Sivel died during the flight from hypoxia, while Tissandier managed to survive, but partially lost his hearing.

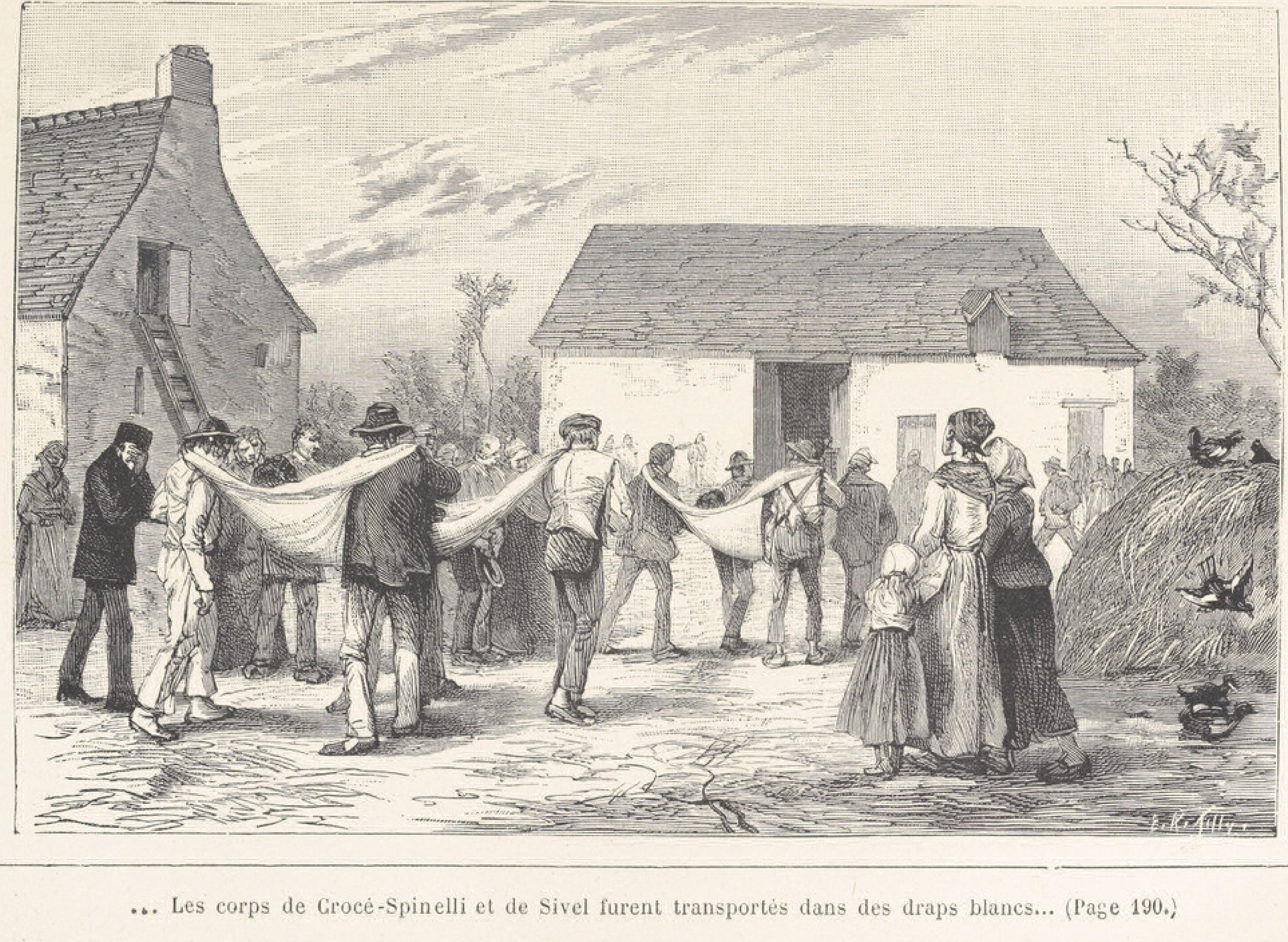
The bodies of Crocé-Spinelli and Sivel are carried into the barn of the farm near which the balloon Zénith crashed, 15 April 1875.

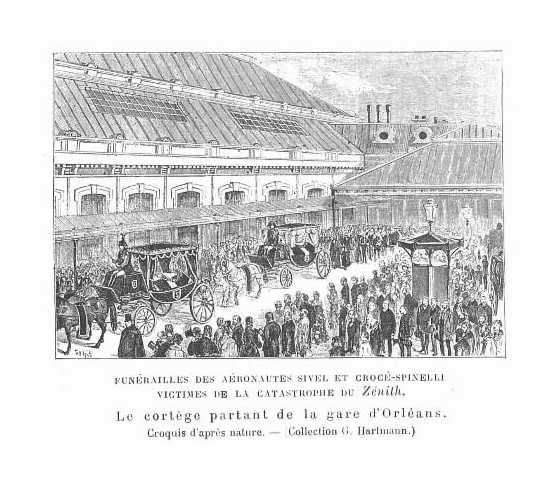
Funeral of Joseph Crocé-Spinelli and Théodore Sivel in Paris, 20 April 1875

After the Zénith crashed in Ciron, Tissandier, still in a state of shock, realized that his companions had perished during the flight. A growing crowd of local residents began to gather at the crash site. To avoid unwanted attention from the crowd, Tissandier decided to move the bodies of Crocé-Spinelli and Sivel to a nearby barn, where he left them and locked the door. Afterward, one of the tenant farmers of Count de Bondy—on whose land the balloon had crashed—took Tissandier to his home. Tissandier was so exhausted that he fell asleep almost immediately and slept until dawn.

In the morning, he wrote a long letter to the president of the French Aeronautical Society, Hervé Mangon, and sent it to Paris. In the letter, Tissandier described in detail everything he remembered about the flight of the Zénith. Later, this letter was reprinted in all the leading newspapers in France and Europe.

The news of the Zénith crash did not reach Paris quickly. The families of the dead scientists were not notified until 18 hours after the crash, and on 16 April, the evening newspapers of Paris reported the news on their pages. Almost all the largest French newspapers immediately sent their reporters to the scene of the disaster, and on the morning of April 17, Gaston Tissandier met them all and his brother Albert at the local train station.

On 18 April, the bodies of Crocé-Spinelli and Sivel were placed in metal boxes, thrown onto a cart, and taken to the local station, from where they were to be sent to Paris. All the way to the station, Tissandier walked alongside the cart in which his two companions lay.

On 19 April, a meeting of the French Academy of Sciences was held, at which its president, Edmond Frémy, gave a special speech. He called Croce-Spinelli and Sivel "martyrs of science" and added that they were "two brave warriors who fell on the battlefield of science."

The funeral of Sivel and Crocé-Spinelli took place on 20 April. About 500-600 people gathered at the Gare d'Orléans in Paris, where the bodies of the deceased scientists arrived. A Protestant pastor (as the deceased were Protestants), Auguste-Scipion Didet, delivered a short speech. The procession set off and walked along the Boulevard Contrescarpe, Place de la Bastille and Rue de la Paix to the Père Lachaise Cemetery. All the way to the cemetery, the crowd of people who came to say goodbye to the scientists grew, and at the funeral ceremony itself, the local police counted about 5,000-6,000 people. The French newspaper L'Aeronaute gave a slightly different figure and claimed that 20,000 people attended the funeral.

It is known that the funeral was attended by many famous French politicians, scientists, writers and scholars. Among them were: Pierre Danfer-Rochereau, Paul Bert, Jean-Baptiste Dumas, Edmond Frémy, Ernest Picard, Henri Giffard, Henri Dupuy de Lome and others.

== Homages ==
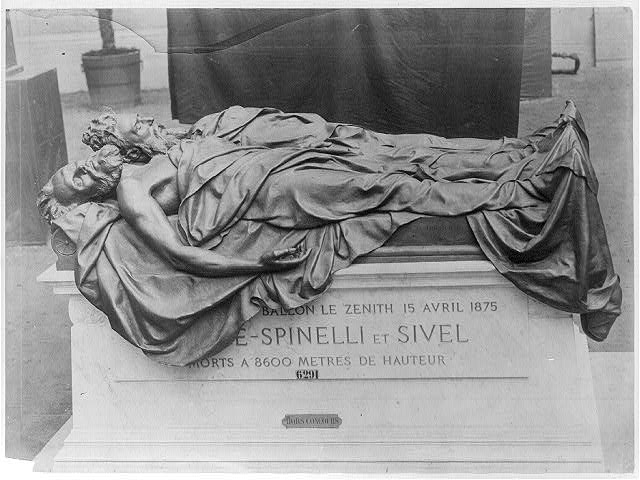
Sculptural composition of the tomb of Joseph Croce-Spinelli and Theodore Sivel (sculptor: Alphonse Dumilatre)

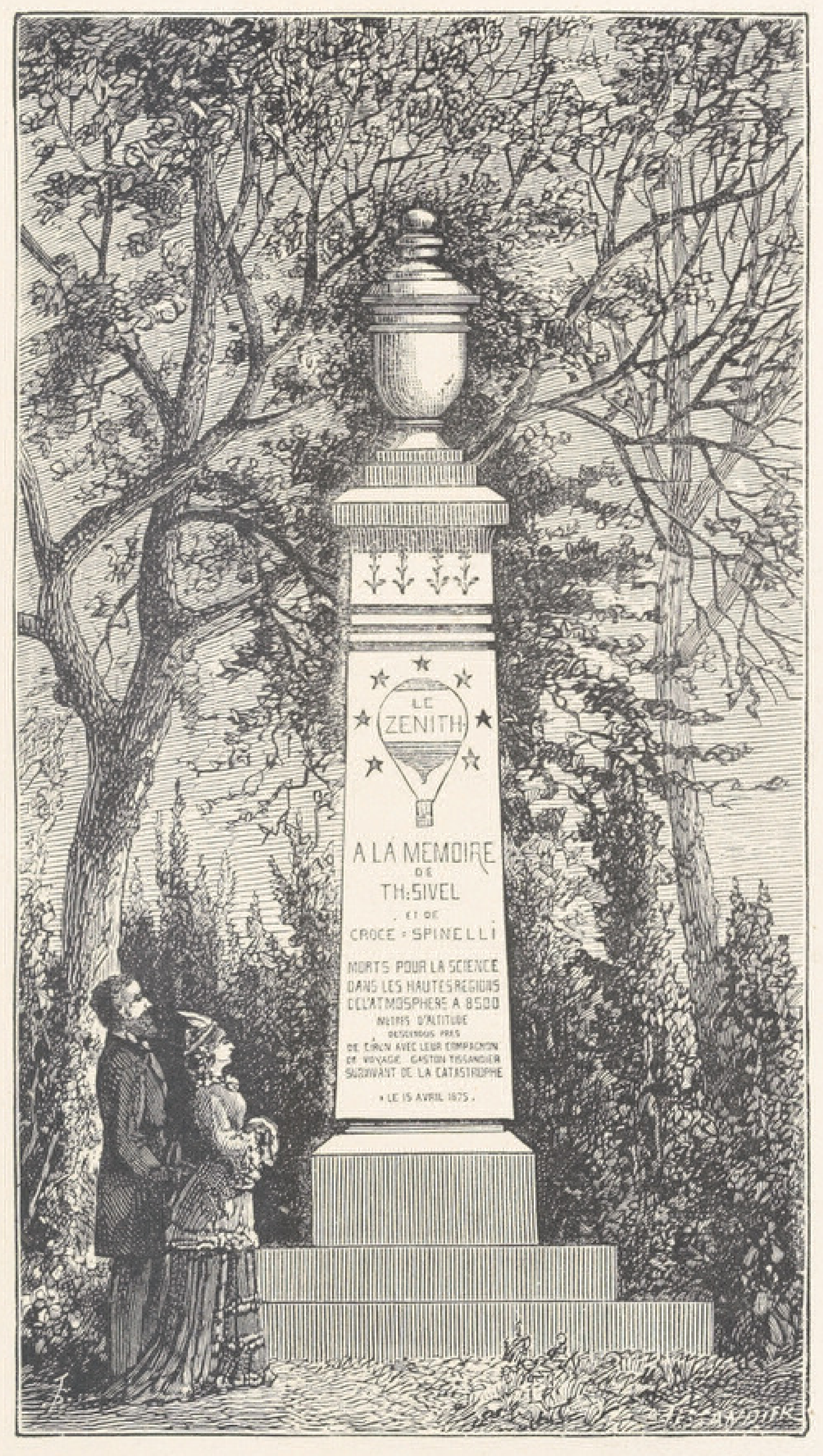
Memorial sign installed in 1881 at the place of the fall of the Zénith balloon (the project was developed by Albert Tissandier)

After the funeral of Crocé-Spinelli and Sivel, the French Society of Aeronautics and several major newspapers announced a public fundraiser to help the families of the victims and to erect a memorial at the site of the balloon crash. This monument, designed by Albert Tissandier (Gaston's brother), was inaugurated on 25 March 1881. It took the form of a large stone obelisk. On 4 April 2017, it was listed as a historical monument of France.

In 1878, a sculptural composition depicting the scientists was installed at the Père Lachaise Cemetery, created by the French sculptor Alphonse Dumilatre. According to the sculptor's idea, Crocé-Spinelli and Sivel lie next to each other and hold hands, in a similar position to which their bodies were seen by local villagers who were the first to arrive at the scene of the Zénith crash. This sculpture on the tomb of the scientists attracts thousands of tourists who visit the Père Lachaise Cemetery every year.

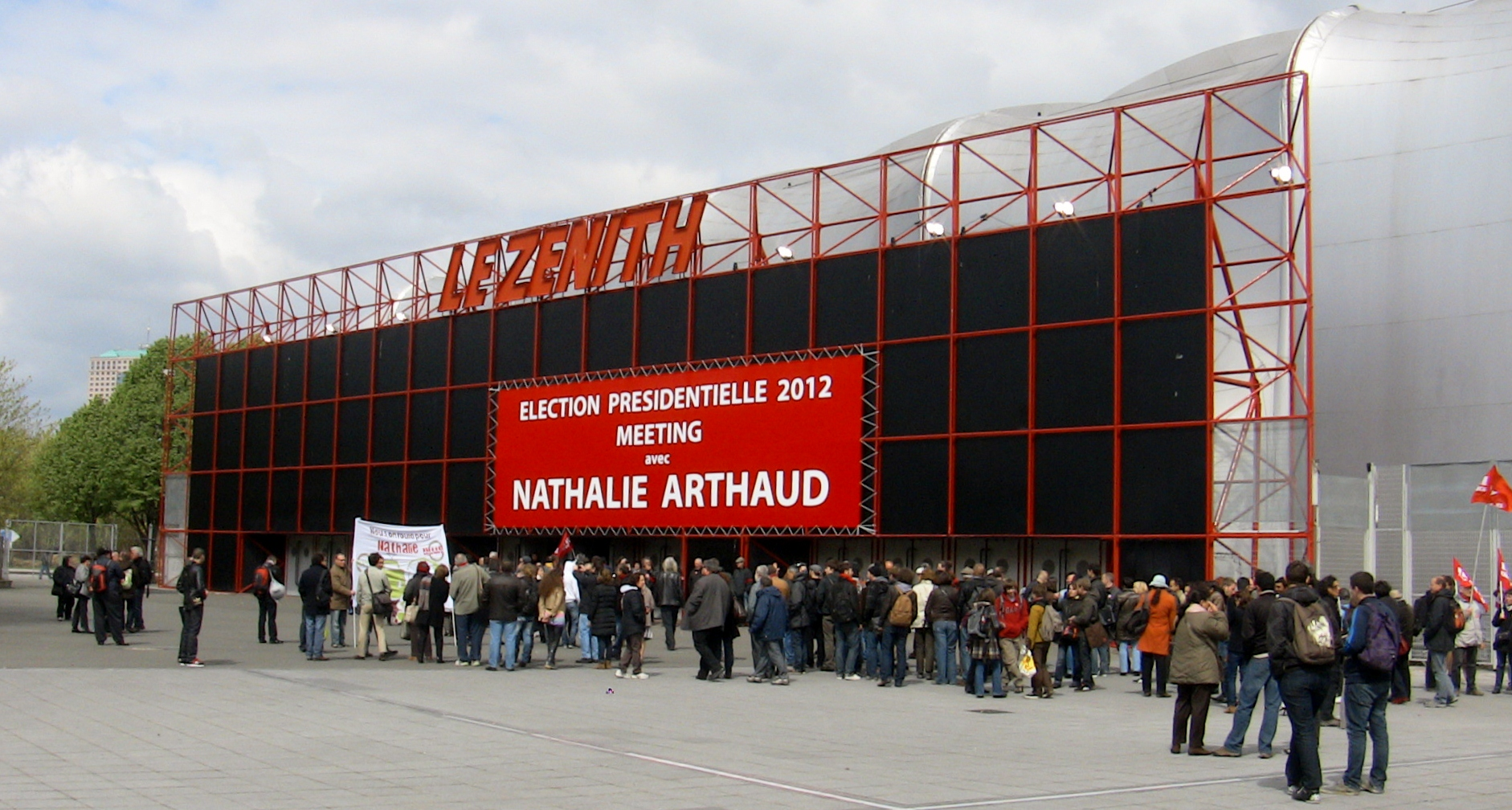
Concert and exhibition hall Le Zénith in the Parc de la Villette, Paris

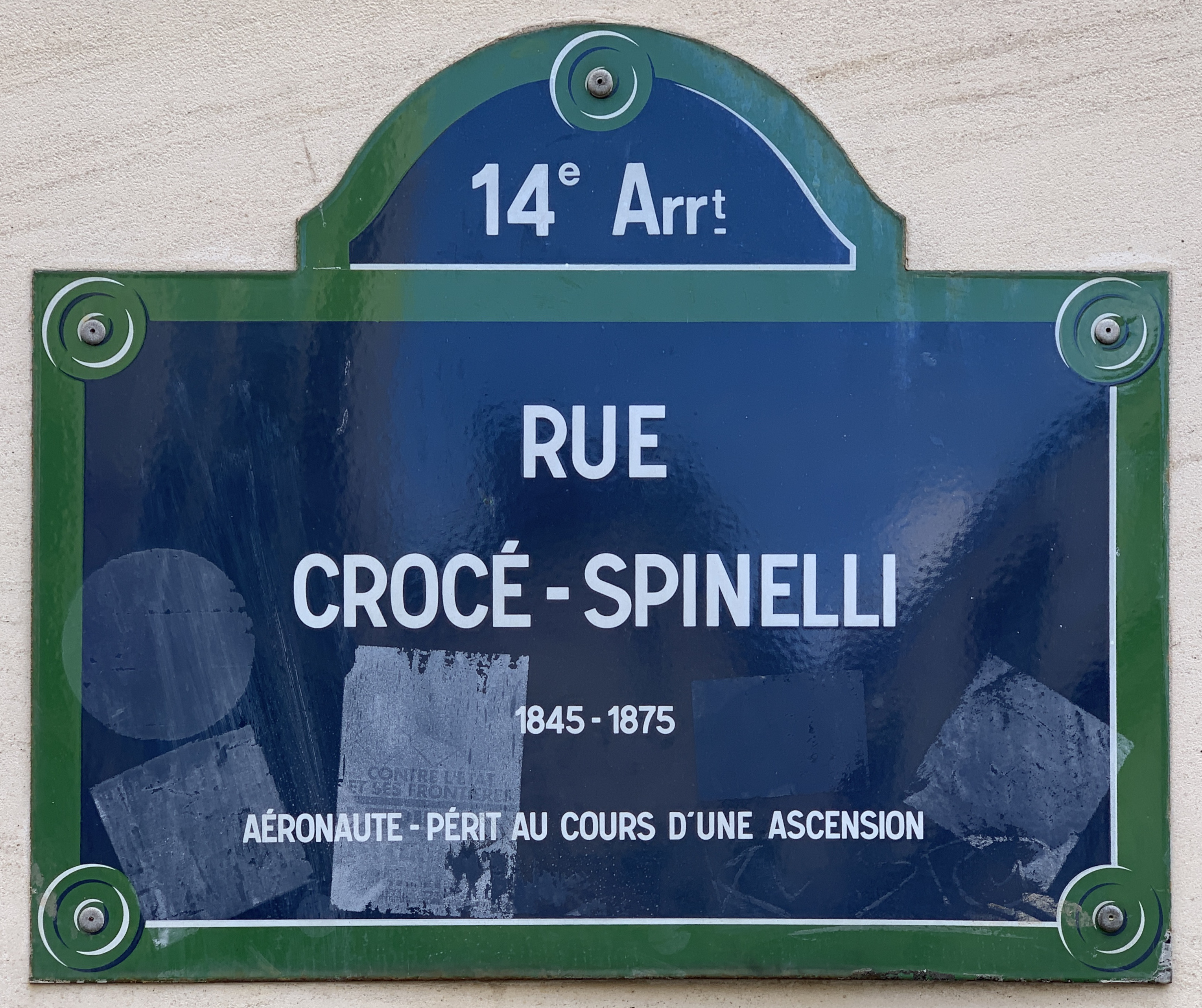
Memorial plaque on Rue Joseph Crocé-Spinelli in Paris

The Zénith disaster and the deaths of Crocé-Spinelli and Sivel inspired the French poet and future Nobel Prize in Literature laureate, Sully Prudhomme, to write the poem "Le Zénith".

The fall of the Zenith so shocked the French community that in the first years after the tragedy, several operatic compositions were composed in honor of Crocé-Spinelli and Sivel, which were performed during theatrical performances. The most famous of them are: Le Zénith (words: Adolphe Perrault, music: Robert Planquette) and Les martyrs du Zénith (words: Julien Fock, music: Jacob Jules).

In 1891, French politician and then-Minister of Culture Jack Lang decided to design and build a large concert and exhibition hall outside Paris. The site for the construction was chosen as the Parc de la Villette. Since it was from this park that the Zénith balloon once took off, the concert hall was named "Le Zénith" in its honor. Later, this name was registered as a trademark and the concept of building large concert and exhibition halls "Le Zénith" was spread throughout France. As of 2021, 17 such concert halls have already been built and are operating throughout the country.

In the 14th arrondissement of Paris, a street is named after Joseph Crocé-Spinelli. One of the colleges in the 14th arrondissement of Paris is also named after the scientist.
