= La Recherche (magazine) =

- Discipline: Interdisciplinary
- Language: French

Publication details
- History: Founded March 1946 as Atomes
- Publisher: Financière Tallandier (France)
- Frequency: Monthly

Standard abbreviations
- ISO 4: Recherche

Indexing
- ISSN: 0029-5671

Links
- Journal homepage

La Recherche is a monthly French language popular science magazine covering recent scientific news. It is published by the Société d'éditions scientifiques (the Scientific Publishing Group), a subsidiary of Financière Tallandier. Tallandier is owned by Artémis, an investment company of François-Henri Pinault. The headquarters is in Paris.

== History ==
Created in 1946 under the name Atomes (Atoms), it changed its name to the current La Recherche in 1970. The first issue with the title was published in May 1970. It absorbed the French journal Nucleus, formerly La Revue Scientifique de France et de l'étranger (the Scientific Journal of France and Abroad) in 1971, followed by Science Progrès, Découverte, formerly La Nature in 1973. La Recherche is published monthly. The website of the magazine was started in 1995.
