= Albert Tissandier =

French architect and scholar

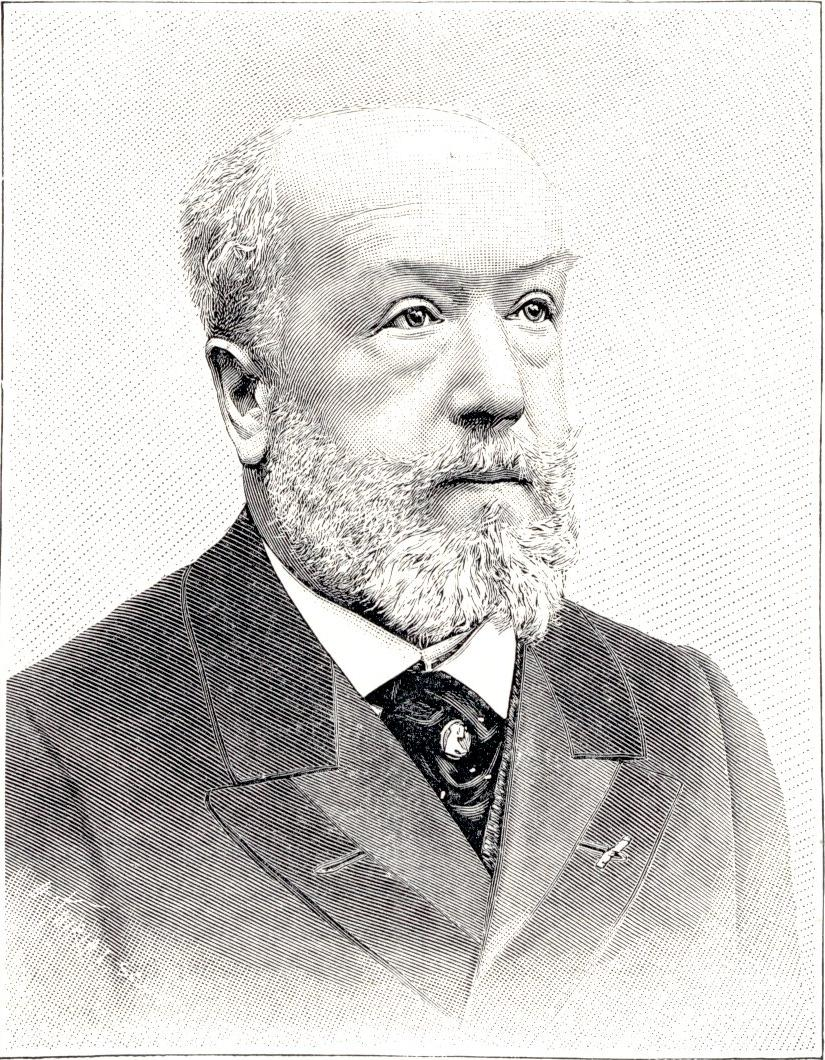
- Born: 1839; Paris, France
- Died: 5 September 1906 (aged 66–67); Jurançon, France
- Occupations: architect, aviator, illustrator, editor, archaeologist
- Relatives: Gaston Tissandier (brother)

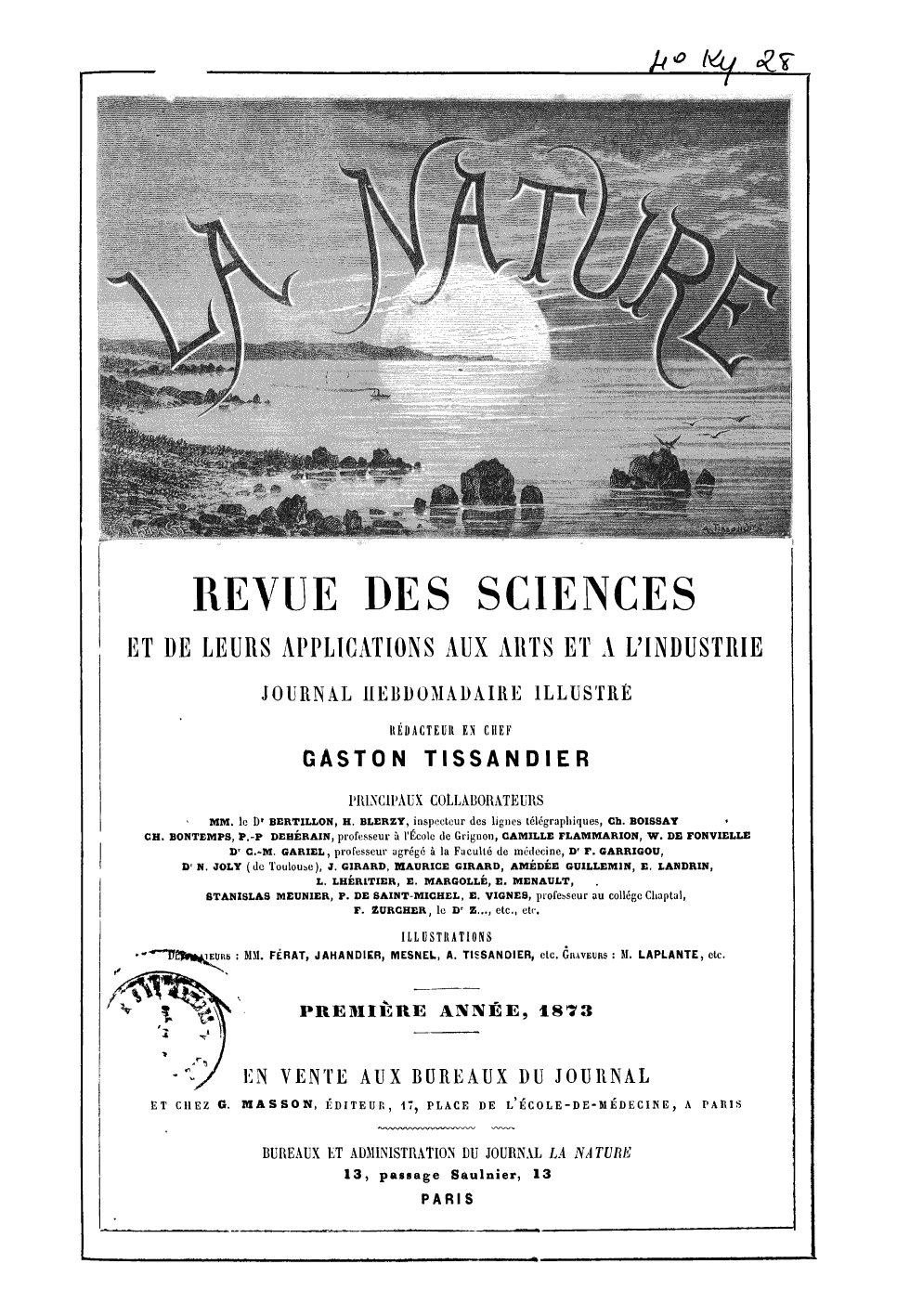
Cover of the first issue of La Nature, 1873. Illustration by Albert Tissandier.

Albert Tissandier (1839 – 5 September 1906) was a French architect, aviator, illustrator, editor and archaeologist. He was the brother of adventurer Gaston Tissandier with whom he collaborated in writing the magazine La Nature, a French language scientific journal aimed at the popularization of science. He and his brother demonstrated the first electric powered flight.

== Early years and La Nature ==
Born in Paris in 1839, Albert Tissandier was a loyal and assiduous companion of his brother, Gaston Tissandier. As an architect, he was involved in a large number of projects.

Though his brother was nominally the sole founder of La Nature, a scientific journal aimed at the popularization of science, Albert contributed extensively to the magazine, mostly as an illustrator and editor. He was heavily involved in it from the very first issue in 1873 until his retirement in 1905, less than a year before his death.

== Aviation career ==
His devotion to aeronautics began on 8 November 1868, when he made his first hot air balloon ascent between Melun and Paris during a snowstorm.

On 14 October 1870, during the siege of Paris in the Franco-Prussian War, Albert Tissandier piloted the balloon Jean-Bart to escape the city, taking two other travellers plus 400 kg (1000 lb) of mail and dispatches from 100 anxious families. He was awarded the Médaille militaire for his bravery.

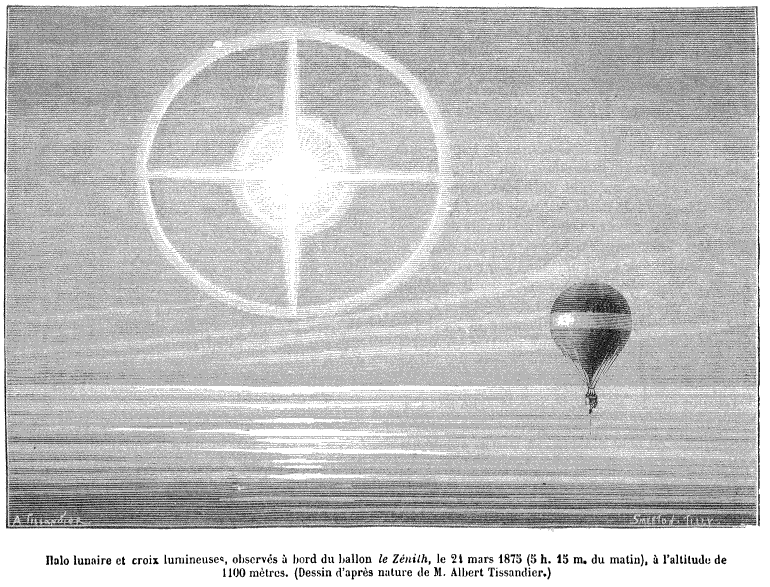
Lunar Halo and Luminous Cross, drawing of nature. Albert Tissandier.

=== The Zénith ===
A few years later, the two brothers ascended in another hot air balloon, this one called the Zénith. On 23 March and 24 March 1875 they flew from Paris to Arcachon, on the other side of the country, near Bordeaux, a total distance of 600 km (400 mi). During this ascent, he drew the countrysides below as naturally as possible. He also observed that when the moon passed above the clouds, the upper surface of the clouds shimmered like a lake, and recorded this in a drawing (left).

Only a few days after this ascent, on 15 April at 11:35 AM, the Zénith went up again, this time with only Gaston Tissandier, Joseph Crocé-Spinelli and Théodore Sivel with the goal of reaching an extreme height in order to continue their observations. They were able to reach the magnificent altitude of 8,600 m (28,200 ft). The latter became victims of their devotion to science dying from asphyxiation from the thin air. Gaston Tissandier himself became deaf and struggled with the problem for the rest of his life.

=== First electric powered flight ===
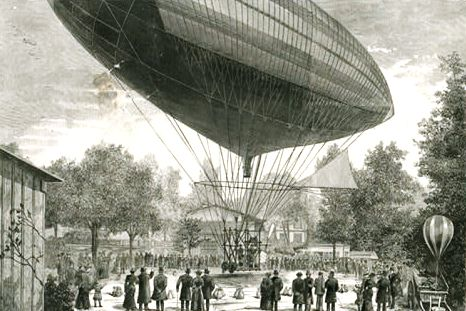
Drawing by E. A. Tilly of an airship powered by an electric motor developed by Albert and Gaston Tissandier, 1883

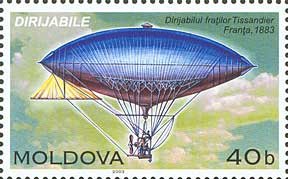
The Tissandier brothers' airship, France, 1883. The first aerostat with an electric engine.

In 1881, the brothers Tissandier demonstrated the world's first electric powered flight at an electricity exposition by attaching an electric motor to a dirigible. It was after their first experiences with flight that they made the large model they demonstrated, for which Albert drew the blueprints. The first flight of an electric dirigible aerostat took place on 8 October 1883. They made a second attempt on 26 September 1884 which gave them all the results they were looking for.

== Archaeology and travels ==
Albert Tissandier was also a passionate writer and traveller. In 1886, he started a long trip around the world in America, subsequently travelling to the East Indies, Ceylon and many other Asian locales, sending his magnificent illustrations back to Paris so they could appear in La Nature.

In January 1890, he was sent by the Minister of Public Instruction and Fine Arts on an archaeological mission to India, China and Japan. These travels occupied him for two years, and he gave a complete account of his travels, including remarkably exact and beautiful illustrations.

In 1893 and 1894, he visited Cambodia and Java including all the Khmer and Javanese ruins. Like his previous trip, he kept a record of precise and detailed illustrations and a large amount of remarkable artifacts.

== Retirement and death ==
Following his travels, he at last returned to Paris and continued working extensively on La Nature. Though his brother Gaston died on 30 August 1899, he continued to be a large contributor to and editor of the magazine. He retired in 1905, dying on 5 September 1906 at Jurançon. Many believed that the magazine would not be able to continue after his death.
