= La Nature =

French language magazine

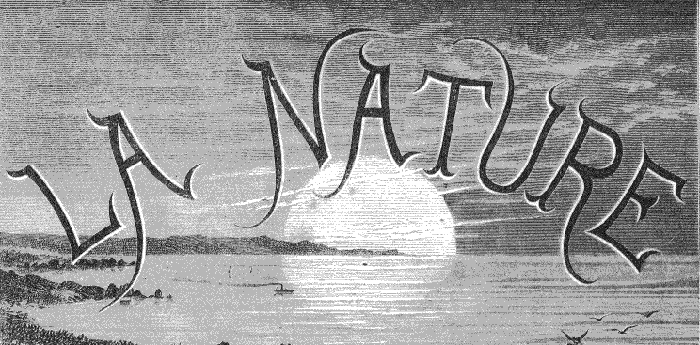
Logo used since the first issue of La Nature, 1873

La Nature (English: Nature) was a French language magazine aimed at the popularization of science established in 1873 by French scientist and adventurer Gaston Tissandier. The magazine also received an enormous amount of time, effort, and contributions from his brother, Albert Tissandier.

== Evolution ==
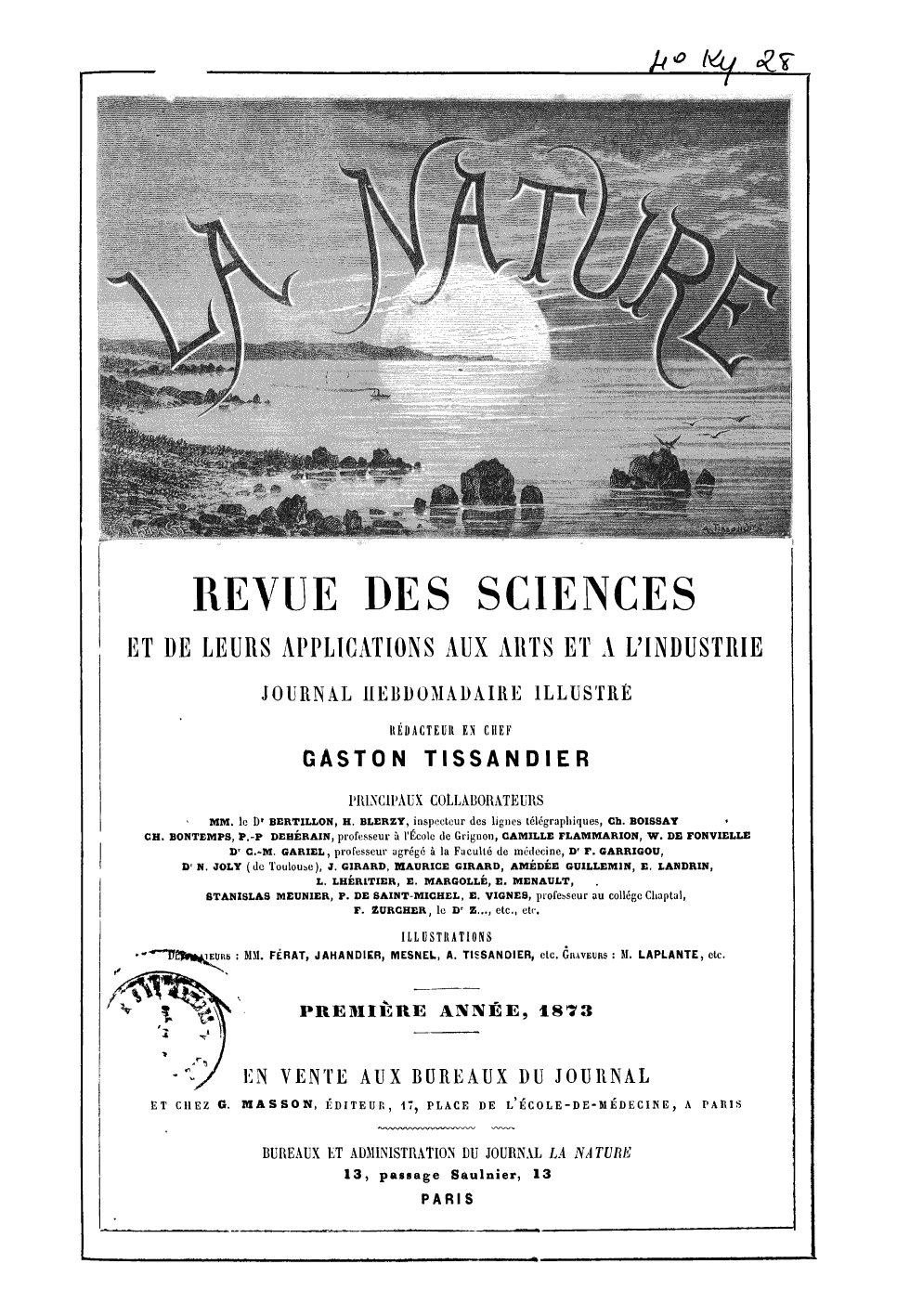
Cover of the first issue of La Nature, 1873

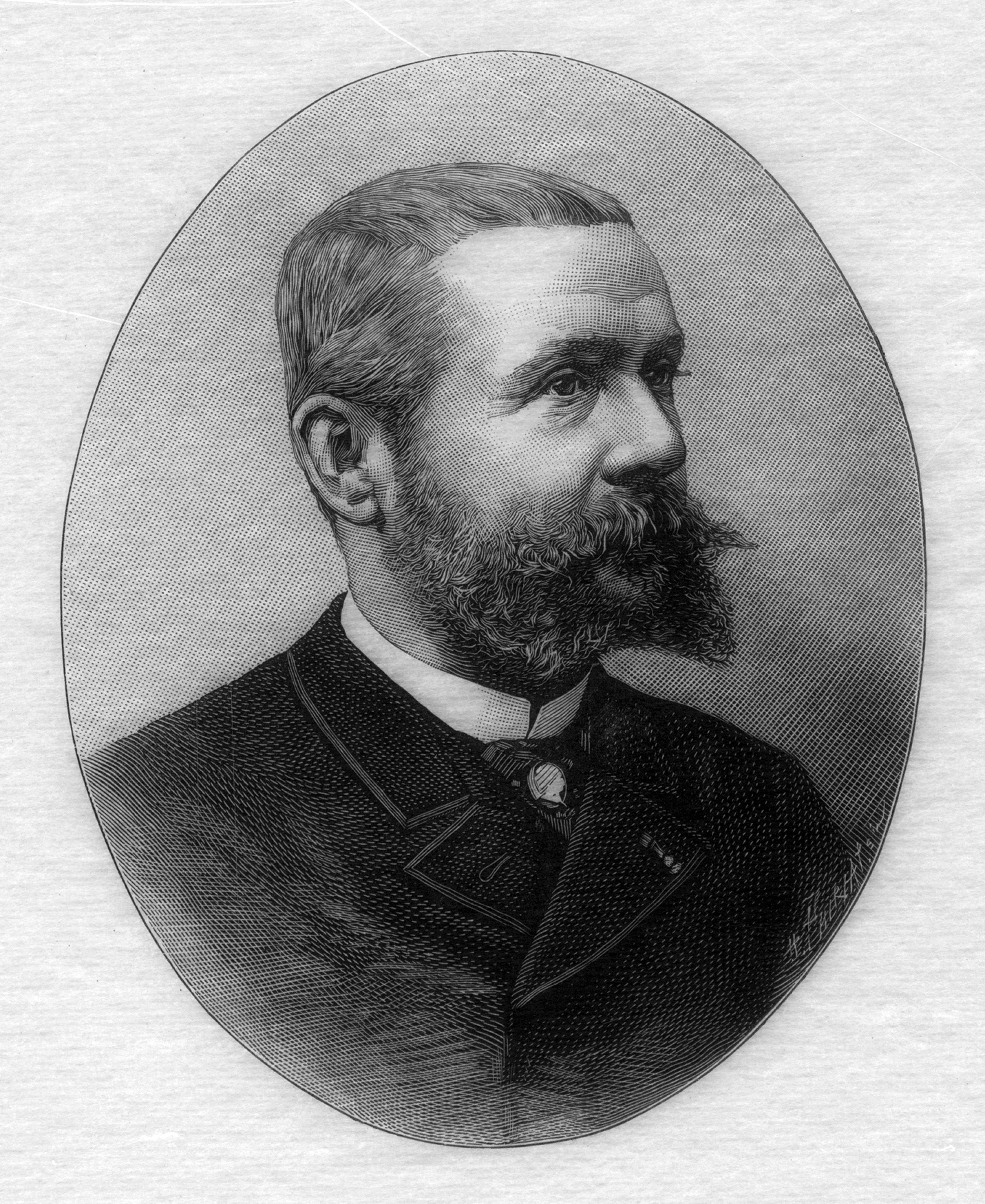
Gaston Tissandier, founder of La Nature

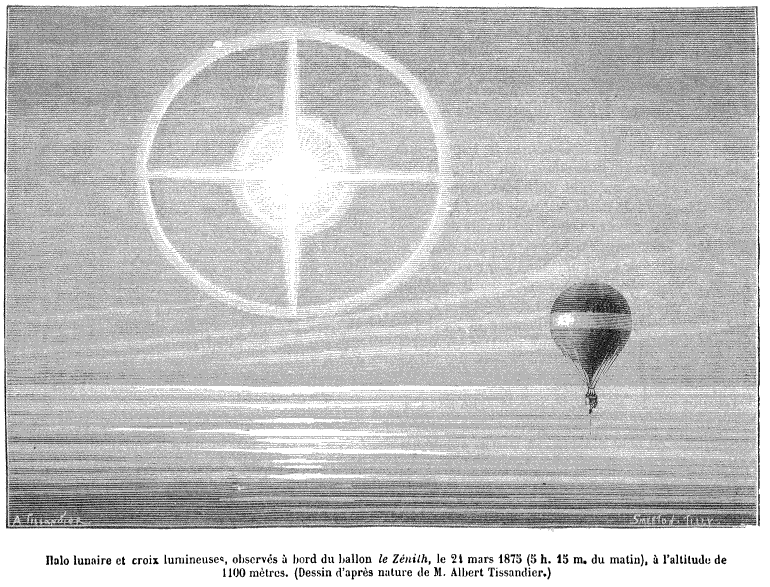
Lunar Halo and Luminous Cross, drawing of nature. Albert Tissandier. Appeared in La Nature in 1875.

=== The beginning ===
From 1873 to 1914, each year's volume started at the beginning of December. The second six-month period began with the first issue in June. Starting in 1915, La Nature's publishing year was brought in sync with the calendar year.

A weekly magazine until the 1920s, it became first fortnightly and then monthly in 1948.

=== Second World War ===
During the Second World War, La Nature was published only erratically. The first interruption in publishing lasted from September 15 to December 15, 1939, with only an additional six issues published during all of 1940. 1941 saw 12 issues published, on the 15th of each month. There were other suspensions in publication, such that only 26 issues were published between 1942 and 1945. The magazine returned to its pre-war biweekly schedule in 1945.

=== Name changes and merger ===
In 1961, La Nature changed its name to La Nature Science Progrès (loosely Nature Magazine: Advances in Science) then in 1963 to Science Progrès La Nature (Advances in Science: Nature Magazine) before becoming Science Progrès Découverte (Advances in Science Discovered) in 1969. Finally, in 1972, La Nature merged with the scientific magazine La Recherche, which is still in print today.

== Editors-in-chief ==
The following have been editor-in-chief of the magazine:

- Gaston Tissandier
- Henri de Parville
- E.-A. Martel
- Jules Laffargue
- L. de Launay
- André Troller
- Paul Ostoya (1957-1969)
