= Gaston Tissandier =

French chemist, meteorologist, aviator, and editor

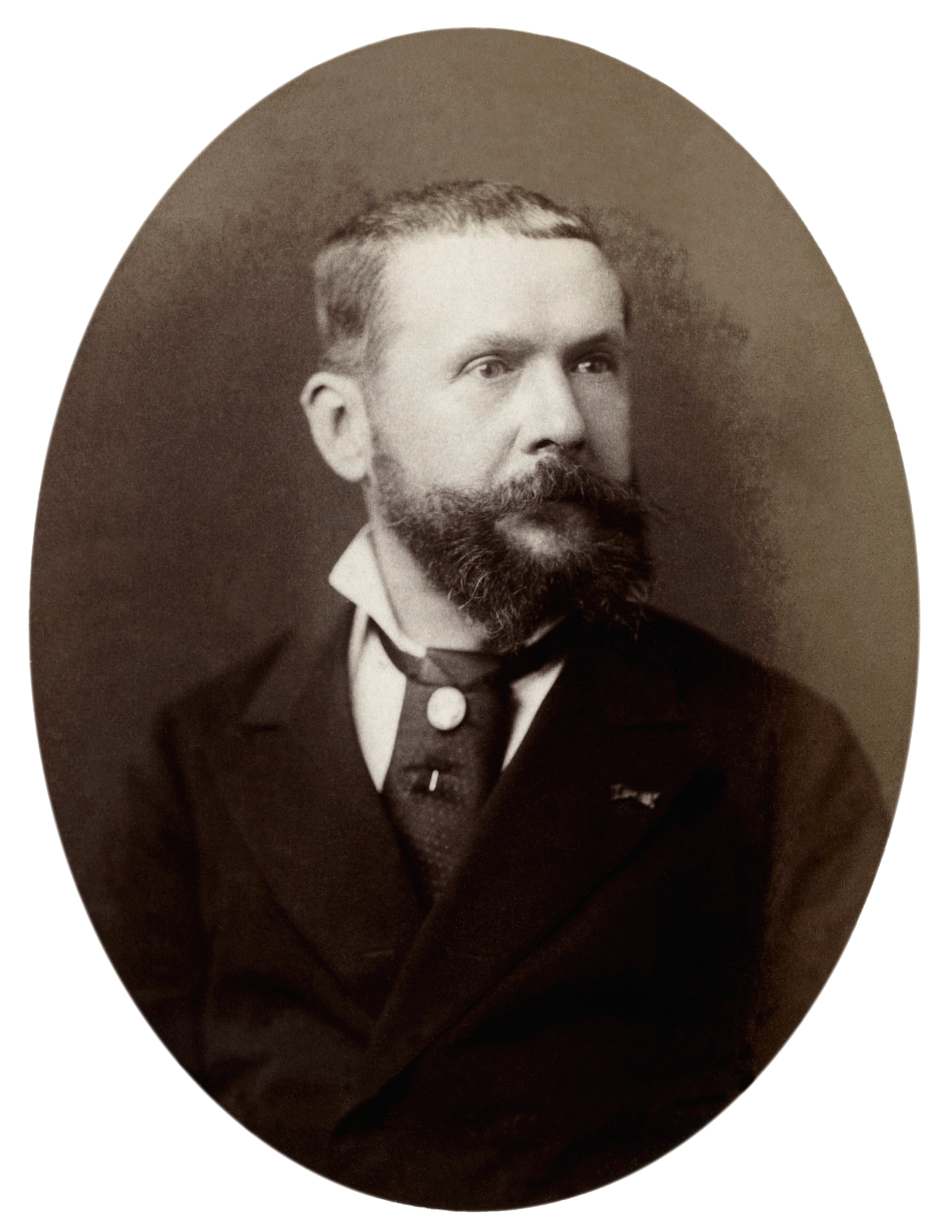
Gaston Tissandier; photograph by Alphonse Liébert

Gaston Tissandier (November 21, 1843 – August 30, 1899) was a French chemist, meteorologist, aviator, and editor. He founded and edited the scientific magazine La Nature and wrote several books.

His brother was illustrator Albert Tissandier. His son Paul became a well known aviator in his own right.

== Biography ==
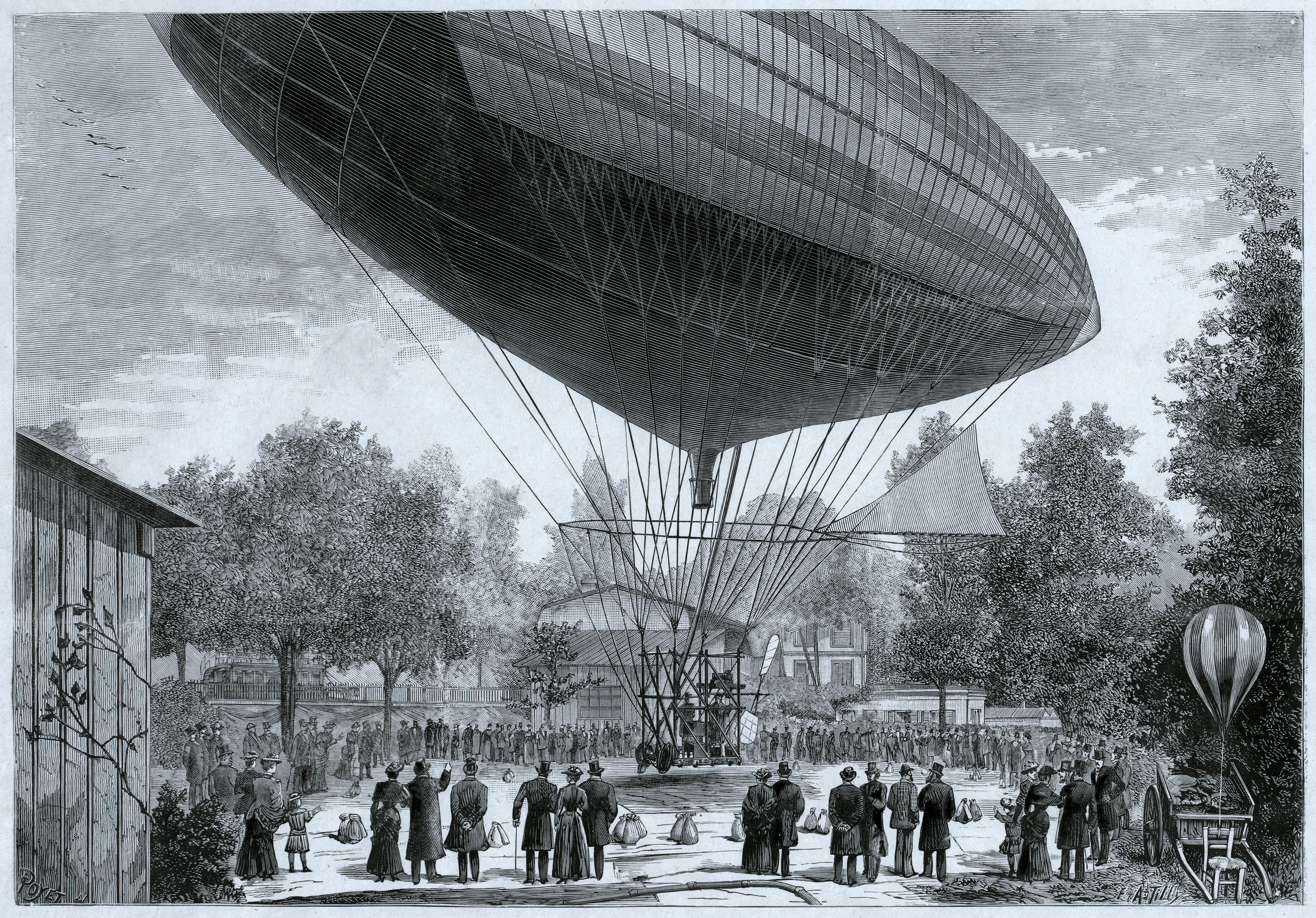
Gaston & Albert Tissandier in their electrically powered dirigible, 8 October 1883 at Auteuil in Paris

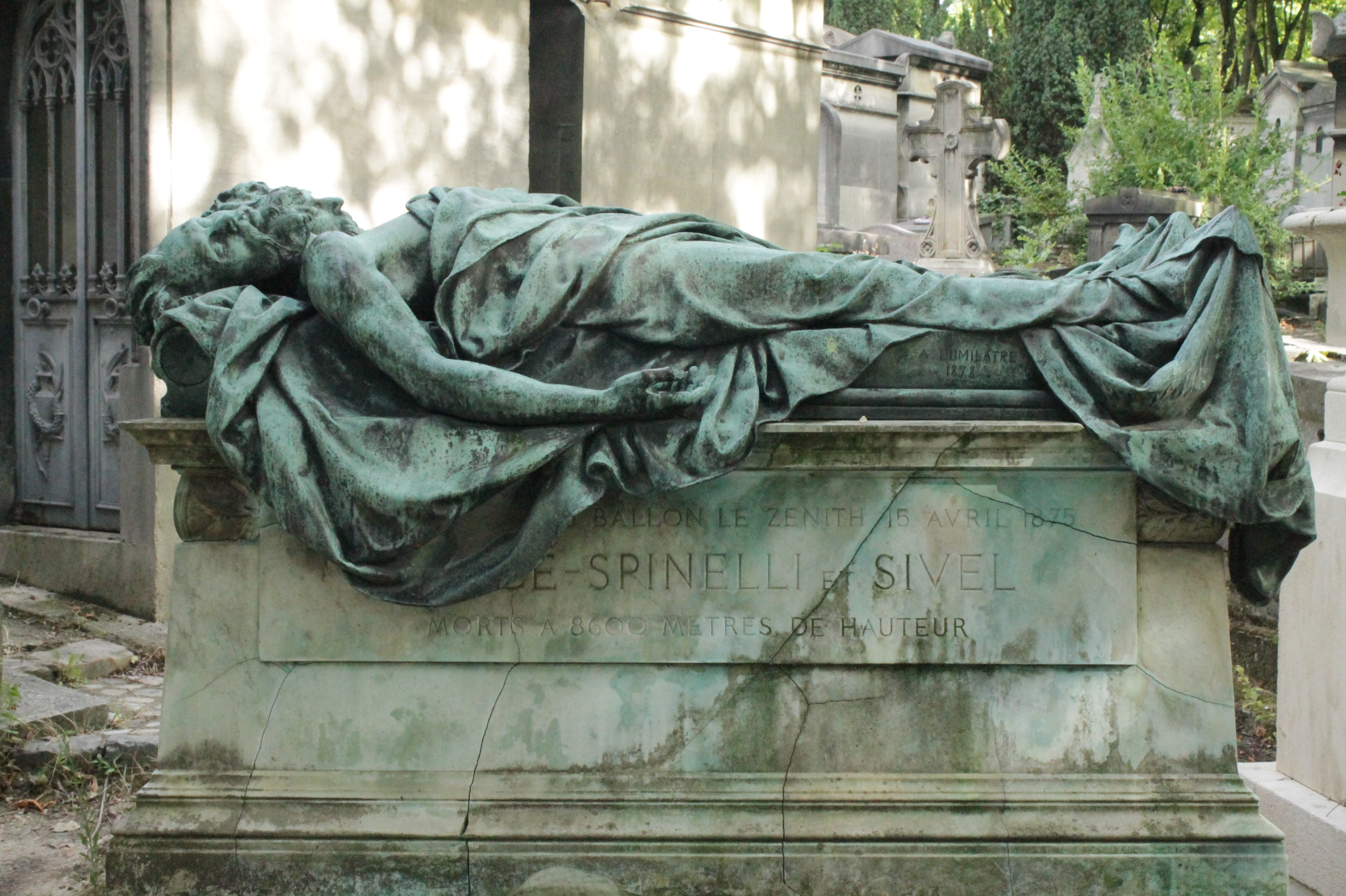
The monument to Spinelli and Sivel in Pere Lachaise Cemetery in Paris

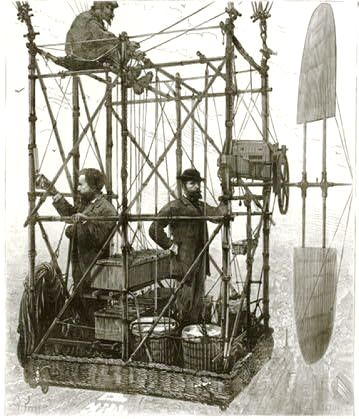
Albert Tissandier (left) and Gaston Tissandier, plus an unidentified man

Gaston Tissandier was born in Paris in 1843. He studied chemistry and in 1864 became the head of the experimental laboratory of Union nationales. He was also a teacher at Association polytechnique. His interest in meteorology led him to take up aviation.

His first trip in the air was conducted at Calais in 1868 together with Claude-Jules Dufour, where his balloon drifted out over the sea and was brought back by an air stream of opposite direction in a higher layer of air. In September 1870, during the Franco-Prussian War, he managed to escape the besieged Paris by balloon.

His most adventurous air trip took place near Paris in April 1875. He and companions Joseph Crocé-Spinelli, journalist, and Théodore Sivel, naval officer, were able to reach in a balloon the magnificent altitude of 8,600 meters (28,200 feet). Both of his companions died from breathing the thin air. Tissandier survived, but lost his hearing. He described the symptoms of altitude sickness.

In 1883, Tissandier fitted a Siemens electric motor to an airship, thus creating the first electric-powered flight.

Tissandier reported his meteorological observations to the French Academy of Sciences. In 1873 he founded the weekly scientific magazine La Nature, which he edited until 1896, after which it was continued by others. He also authored several books:

== Works ==
- Eléments de Chimie (1870)
- L'Eau (1867)
- La Houille (1886)
- Histoire de mes ascensions récit de quarante voyages aériens (1868-1886) (1887; German edition 1872)
- En ballon! Pendant le siège de Paris. Souvenirs d'un aéronaute (1871)
- Les Merveilles de la photographie (1874)
- Histoire de la gravure typographique (1875)
- Simples notions sur les ballons (1876)
- A history and handbook of photography (La photographie, 1873)
- Le Grand Ballon captif à vapeur de M. Henry Giffard (1879)
- Les Martyrs de la science (1879)
- Observations météorologiques en ballon. Résumé de 25 ascensions aérostatiques (1879)
- Les ballons dirigeables: Application de l'électricité à la navigation aerienne; [Ouvrage accompagné de 35 fig. et de 4 pl. hors texte] (1885)
- La photographie en ballon, avec une table (1886)
- Histoire des ballons et des aéronautes célèbres (1890)
- La Tour Eiffel de 300 mètres: description du monument, sa construction, ses organes mécaniques, son but et son utilité. Avec une lettre autographie de G. Eiffel (1889)
- Bibliographie aéronautique: Catalogue de livres d'histoire, de science, de voyages et de fantaisie, traitant de la navigation aérienne ou des aérostats (1887)

Besides these scientific works, Tissandier also published several titles for the youth, such as Les récréations scientifiques ou l'enseignement par les jeux (1880), perhaps the very first title in the genre of books of simple science experiments that anybody can conduct in their own home. Its chapters were in part based on the column "physique sans appareils" (physics without apparatus) in La Nature.

== See also ==
- List of years in aviation
- List of French inventions and discoveries
- French space program
