= Ciron, Indre =

Ciron
- Commune
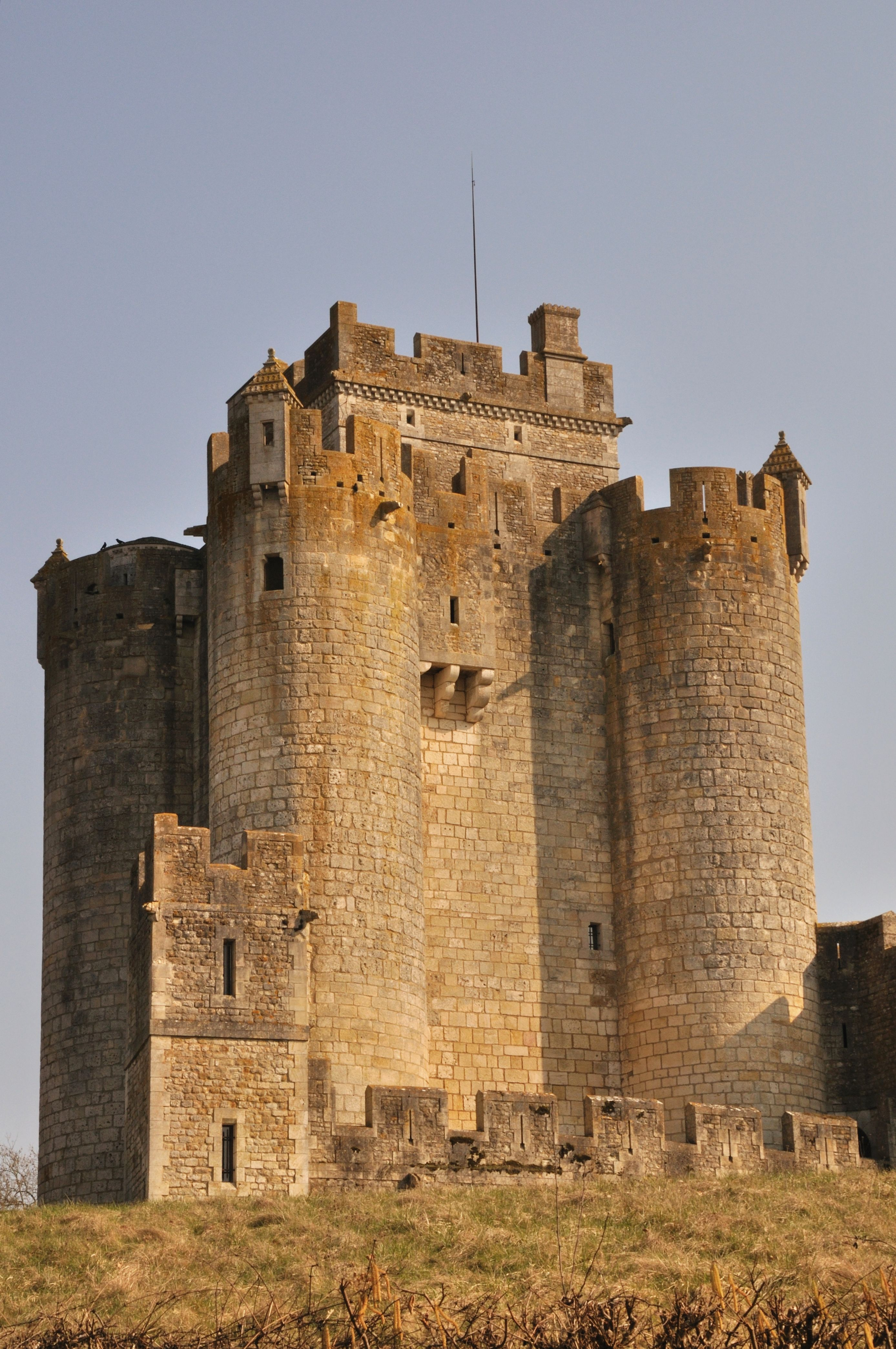
- Chateau of Romefort
- Location of Ciron
- Location within France Location within Centre-Val de Loire
- Coordinates: 46°37′42″N 1°14′45″E
- Country: France
- Region: Centre-Val de Loire
- Department: Indre
- Arrondissement: Le Blanc
- Canton: Le Blanc

Government
  - Mayor (2020–2026): Gérard Defez
- Area^{1}: 57.94 km^{2} (22.37 sq mi)
- Elevation: 101 m (331 ft)
- Highest elevation: 154 m (505 ft)
- Lowest elevation: 78 m (256 ft)
- Population (2023): 520
  - Density: 9.0/km^{2} (23/sq mi)
- Time zone: UTC+01:00 (CET)
  - Summer (DST): UTC+02:00 (CEST)
- INSEE/Postal code: 36053 /36300
- ^{1} French Land Register data, which excludes lakes, ponds, glaciers > 1 km^{2} (0.386 sq mi or 247 acres) and river estuaries.

Ciron (French pronunciation: [siʁɔ̃]) is a commune in the Indre department in central France. It is notable for its twelfth-century lanterne des morts, Eglise Saint-Georges, and the chateau Romefort by the picturesque river Creuse. An abandoned railroad goes through the village south of national route D951, which bisects the village.

== Geography ==
The commune is located in the parc naturel régional de la Brenne. The river Creuse borders the commune to the south. There is one bridge crossing over the Creuse in Ciron that connects the commune with the medieval chateau of Romefort, which dates from the era of the Hundred Year War between the English and the French crowns. Romefort consists of the donjon and a residential wing, and there is the ruins of a notable attached watermill by the Creuse river.

== Population ==
Historical population
Year	Pop.	±% p.a.
1968	647	—
1975	564	−1.94%
1982	522	−1.10%
1990	529	+0.17%
1999	533	+0.08%
2007	507	−0.62%
2012	525	+0.70%
2017	572	+1.73%
2023	520	−1.58%
Source: INSEE

== See also ==
- Communes of the Indre department
