= Timeline of aviation in the 20th century =

Timeline
of aviation
pre-18th century
18th century
19th century
20th century
21st century begins

== 1901 ==
- July 31 - German meteorologists Berson and Süring climb to 10,800 m in a free balloon.

=== October ===
- October 19 - Alberto Santos-Dumont, a Brazilian, flies his dirigible Number 6 around the Eiffel Tower to collect an FF100,000 prize.
- October 29 - the Royal Aero Club of Great Britain is established.
- Wilhelm Kress trials a triplane seaplane that makes a short hop before capsizing.

=== November–December ===
- The Wright brothers optimize their No. 3 Glider wing design with the help of wind tunnel measurements.

== 1902 ==
- The Wright brothers fly their No. 3 Glider on over 700 flights, results lead directly to the construction of the Flyer.

=== February ===
- February 4 - First balloon flight in Antarctica when Robert Falcon Scott and Ernest Shackleton ascend to 800 feet (240 m) in a tethered hydrogen balloon to take the first Antarctic aerial photographs.
- February 4 - Future pilot Charles Lindbergh is born.

=== March ===
- Professor Erich von Drygalski's 1901-1903 German Antarctic Expedition uses a balloon to survey the Antarctic coast of Wilhelm II Land.

=== April ===
- April 30 - The St Louis Aeronautical Exposition opens in Missouri. A highlight is Octave Chanute launching a replica of his 1896 glider.

== 1903 ==
- Léon Levavasseur demonstrates his Antoinette engine, designed as a lightweight powerplant specifically for aircraft.
- Konstantin Tsiolkovsky deduces the Basic Rocket Equation in his article Explorations of outer space with the help of reaction apparatuses.

=== February ===
- February 16 Traian Vuia presented to the Académie des Sciences of Paris the possibility of flying with a heavier-than-air mechanical machine and his procedure for taking off, but it was rejected for being a utopia, adding the comments: The problem of flight with a machine which weighs more than air can not be solved and it is only a dream.

=== March ===
- March 31 - Richard Pearse is reputed to have made a powered flight in a heavier-than-air craft, a monoplane of his own construction, that crash lands on a hedge. This date is computed from circumstantial evidence of eyewitnesses as the flight was not well documented at the time. The machine made a flight claimed to be around 150 feet (45 m) on his farm at Upper Waitohi, near Timaru in south Canterbury, New Zealand.

=== May ===
- May 11 - Richard Pearse is claimed to have made a flight of around 1,000 yards (900 m), landing in the semi-dry bed of the Ōpihi River.

=== August ===
- August 18 - Karl Jatho makes a flight with his motored aircraft in front of four people. . His craft flies up to 200 feet (60 m) a few feet above the ground in a powered heavier-than-air craft.

=== October ===
- October 7 – Samuel Langley conducts the first tests of his full-sized man-carrying version of his earlier model aerodromes. The pilot Charles Manly nearly drowned when the machine slid off its launch apparatus atop a houseboat and fell into the Potomac River.

=== November ===
- November 12 - The Lebaudy brothers make a controlled dirigible flight of 54 km (34 mi) from Moisson to Paris, France.

=== December ===
- December 8 - second attempt by Charles Manly to fly Langley's repaired full-sized aerodrome. As with the October 7 attempt the machine failed to fly tripping on its launch gear and somersaulting into the Potomac River nearly killing Manly. A surviving photograph captures the machine upended on its side as it falls off the houseboat. Langley himself was absent at this attempt but the machine's failure to fly ended his government(aka U.S. Army) funded attempts at building a successful full sized man-carrying flying machine.
- December 17 - The Dayton, Ohio, native Wright Brothers make four flights in their Wright Flyer at Kitty Hawk, North Carolina following years of research and development. Orville Wright takes off first and flies 120 ft (37 m)in 12 seconds. This is frequently considered the first controlled, powered heavier-than-air flight and is the first such flight photographed. On the fourth effort, which is considered by some to be the first true controlled, powered heavier-than-air flight, Wilbur flies 852 ft (260 m) in 59 seconds.

== 1904 ==
- The Wrights apply for patents for their flying machine in Germany and France.

=== April ===
- April 1 - Captain Ferdinand Ferber makes a failed attempt to fly an Archdeacon glider at Berck sur Mer, Picardy.
- April 3 - Gabriel Voisin successfully flies a modified Archdeacon glider at Berck sur Mer, Picardy. Voisin added a canard to the design. His longest flight on this day was 25 seconds.

=== May ===
- May 23 - First flight attempt, unsuccessful, of the Wright Flyer II.

=== June ===
- The British Army tests Samuel Cody's person-carrying kites at Aldershot.

=== August ===
- August 3 - Major Thomas Scott Baldwin demonstrates the first successful U.S. Airship, "California Arrow", at Oakland, California

=== September ===
- September 20 - Wilbur Wright makes the first circuit flight, in the Flyer II.

=== November ===
- November 9 - Wilbur Wright flies the Wright Flyer II a distance of 3 miles near Dayton, Ohio, the first flight of longer than five minutes.

== 1905 ==
=== March ===
- March 16–20 - Daniel Maloney is launched by balloon in a tandem-wing glider designed by John Montgomery and makes three successful flights at Aptos, CA, the highest launch being at 3,000 feet with an 18-minute descent to a predetermined landing location.

=== April ===
- April 27 - Sapper Moreton of the British Army's balloon section is lifted 2,600 ft (792 m) by a kite at Aldershot under the supervision of the kite's designer, Samuel Cody.
- April 29 - Daniel Maloney is launched by balloon in a tandem-wing glider designed by John Montgomery to an altitude of 4,000 feet before release and gliding flight and landing at a predetermined location as part of a large public demonstration of aerial flight at Santa Clara, California.

=== June ===
- June 6 - Gabriel Voisin flies along the River Seine in his float-glider towed by a motorboat.
- June 23 - Wright Flyer III first flight.

=== July ===
- July 14 - Orville Wright has a serious crash with Wright Flyer III, upon which the Wright Brothers radically alter the aircraft. The pivot point of the front rudder is mainly the culprit for the Flyer's insistent pitching.
- July 18 - Daniel Maloney makes a launch in a tandem-wing glider designed by John Montgomery at Santa Clara, California. However, a balloon cable damages the glider and upon release Maloney and the aircraft fell uncontrolled to the ground, leading to Maloney's death.

=== September ===
- September - The Wright Brothers resume flight experiments with the re-designed Flyer III with performance of the airplane immediately in the positive. Smooth controlled flights lasting over 20 minutes now occur.

=== October ===
- October 5 - Wilbur Wright makes a flight of 24.2 miles (38.9 km) in Flyer III. The flight lasts for almost 39:23 minutes at Huffman Prairie in Dayton, Ohio.
- October 14 - the Fédération Aéronautique Internationale (FAI) is founded in Paris

=== November ===
- November 30 - Count Ferdinand von Zeppelin's LZ2 airship is damaged while attempting its first launch.

=== December ===
- Neil MacDermid is carried aloft in Canada by a large box kite named The Siamese Twins, designed by Alexander Graham Bell.
