= 1902 in aviation =

- Years in aviation: 1899 1900 1901 1902 1903 1904 1905
- Centuries: 19th century · 20th century · 21st century
- Decades: 1870s 1880s 1890s 1900s 1910s 1920s 1930s
- Years: 1899 1900 1901 1902 1903 1904 1905

This is a list of aviation-related events from 1902:

== Events ==
- The Wright brothers fly their No. 3 Glider, with assisted take off, on over 700 flights, results lead directly to the construction of the Flyer.
- The British Admiralty rejects a proposal to use captive balloons for submarine detection.
- On an unspecified Sunday in 1902, the Ezekiel Airship is claimed to have flown in Pittsburg, Texas. According to these claims, the craft flew approximately 160 feet (49 m) at a height of between 10 feet (3.0 m) and 12 feet (3.7 m) in the presence of only a handful of witnesses; those involved allegedly took an oath of silence, and there is no physical evidence to support any of their claims.

=== January – December ===
- January – British Army Colonel James Templer visits the Brazilian aviation pioneer Alberto Santos-Dumont in Paris and compiles a report on Santos-Dumont's non-rigid airships. The British War Office approves his recommendation that the British Army begin experimenting with such airships. The first British airship will result from this program, and will make its first flight in 1907.
- 10 January – German meteorologist and aerologist Arthur Berson and balloonist Hermann Elias set a German balloon distance record, covering 1,470 kilometers (913 miles) from Berlin, Germany, to Poltava in the Russian Empire in 30 hours.
- 17 January – Gustave Whitehead claims a circling 11 km (7 mi) flight over water in a 40 hp- 29.9-kW- engine-powered flying machine with wheels and an amphibious boat-shaped hull. He supposedly makes a water landing near his starting point, and helpers pull him from the water.
- 28 January to 14 February – Alberto Santos-Dumont starts a series of 5 experimental airship flights in Monaco.
- 4 February – First balloon flight in Antarctica when Robert Falcon Scott and Ernest Shackleton ascend to 800 feet (240 m) in a tethered hydrogen balloon to take the first Antarctic aerial photographs.
- March – Professor Erich von Drygalski's 1901–1903 German Antarctic Expedition uses a balloon to survey the Antarctic coast of Wilhelm II Land.
- 30 April – The St Louis Aeronautical Exposition opens in Missouri.
- 12 May – Brazilian Augusto Severo and French engineer Georges Saché fly the semi-rigid airship Pax, which Severo designed, over Paris for its maiden flight. When they begin to lose control of the airship, it catches fire and explodes 1,200 feet (366 m) above Montparnasse Cemetery, killing both men instantly.
- 15 May – Lyman Gilmore, United States, later claims to have been the first person to fly a powered aircraft (a steam-powered glider), on this date, but there were no witnesses.
- 13 October – Over Paris, Hungarian-born French diplomat Herlad de Bradsky and electrical engineer Paul Morin fly an airship of their own design on its first test flight. At an altitude of about 600 feet (183 m), the gondola separates from rest of the airship and the two men fall to their deaths.
- October 1902. – The Wright brothers complete development of the three-axis control system with the incorporation of a movable rudder connected to the wing warping control on their 1902 Glider. They subsequently make several fully controlled heavier than air gliding flights, including one of 622.5 ft (189.7 m) in 26 seconds. The 1902 glider is the basis for their patented control system, still used on modern fixed-wing aircraft.
