= Timeline of aviation =

This is a timeline of aviation history, and a list of more detailed aviation timelines. The texts in the diagram are clickable links to articles.

== Timeline ==
- Timeline of aviation before the 18th century
- Timeline of aviation – 18th century
- Timeline of aviation – 19th century
- Timeline of aviation – 20th century

=== By decade ===
- 1900s: 1900 – 1901 – 1902 – 1903 – 1904 – 1905 – 1906 – 1907 – 1908 – 1909
- 1910s: 1910 – 1911 – 1912 – 1913 – 1914 – 1915 – 1916 – 1917 – 1918 – 1919
- 1920s: 1920 – 1921 – 1922 – 1923 – 1924 – 1925 – 1926 – 1927 – 1928 – 1929
- 1930s: 1930 – 1931 – 1932 – 1933 – 1934 – 1935 – 1936 – 1937 – 1938 – 1939
- 1940s: 1940 – 1941 – 1942 – 1943 – 1944 – 1945 – 1946 – 1947 – 1948 – 1949
- 1950s: 1950 – 1951 – 1952 – 1953 – 1954 – 1955 – 1956 – 1957 – 1958 – 1959
- 1960s: 1960 – 1961 – 1962 – 1963 – 1964 – 1965 – 1966 – 1967 – 1968 – 1969
- 1970s: 1970 – 1971 – 1972 – 1973 – 1974 – 1975 – 1976 – 1977 – 1978 – 1979
- 1980s: 1980 – 1981 – 1982 – 1983 – 1984 – 1985 – 1986 – 1987 – 1988 – 1989
- 1990s: 1990 – 1991 – 1992 – 1993 – 1994 – 1995 – 1996 – 1997 – 1998 – 1999
- 2000s: 2000 – 2001 – 2002 – 2003 – 2004 – 2005 – 2006 – 2007 – 2008 – 2009
- 2010s: 2010 – 2011 – 2012 – 2013 – 2014 – 2015 – 2016 – 2017 – 2018 – 2019
- 2020s: 2020 – 2021 – 2022 – 2023 – 2024 – 2025 – 2026

== See also ==
- Aircraft records
- Aviation accidents and incidents
- Aviation archaeology
- Early flying machines
- History of aviation
- List of firsts in aviation
- Timeline of air cargo and airmail
- Timeline of spaceflight
- Timeline of transportation technology
