= 1904 in aviation =

- Years in aviation: 1901 1902 1903 1904 1905 1906 1907
- Centuries: 19th century · 20th century · 21st century
- Decades: 1870s 1880s 1890s 1900s 1910s 1920s 1930s
- Years: 1901 1902 1903 1904 1905 1906 1907

This is a list of aviation-related events from 1904:

== Events ==
- Frenchman Robert Esnault-Pelterie flies a glider based on the Wright brothers' glider designs but employing ailerons rather than wing-warping for control. His glider is the first full-sized aircraft to employ ailerons.
- The French Navy disbands its balloon branch.
- During the Russo-Japanese War, the Imperial Japanese Army uses two Japanese-designed kite balloons during the Siege of Port Arthur (which begins on 1 August); they make 14 successful flights. It is Japan's first combat use of military aviation of any kind.
- At Vladivostok, Imperial Russian Army engineer Captain Fyodor A. Postnikov and his crews make frequent ascents in spherical balloons and a kite balloon from Russian ships, and the armored cruiser Rossia tests various forms of air-sea communications from balloons and the use of shipboard balloons for directing gunfire against shore targets and in detecting naval mines.
- The Royal Swedish Navy commissions Ballondepotfartyg Nr 1 ("Balloon Depot Ship No. 1"), a barge designed to operate one kite balloon. She is the first watercraft designed and built specifically for aeronautical purposes.

=== January–December ===
- January – Before the beginning of the Russo-Japanese War, the Imperial Russian Navy conducts many experiments with towing balloons and man-lifting kites from its warships.
- 22 and 24 March – The Wright brothers apply for patents for their flying machine in France and Germany.
- 1 April – Captain Ferdinand Ferber makes a failed attempt to fly an Archdeacon glider at Berck sur Mer, Picardy.
- 3 April – Gabriel Voisin successfully flies a modified Archdeacon glider at Berck sur Mer, Picardy. Voisin added a canard to the design. His longest flight on this day is 25 seconds.
- 23 April – Thomas Scott Baldwin makes a flight with August Greth's dirigible The California Eagle at San Francisco. This flight predated his efforts with the California Arrow.
- April–May – John J. Montgomery and Thomas Scott Baldwin work together at Santa Clara College in California using a wind tunnel to refine propeller designs for dirigibles. These propeller designs were used on Baldwin's successful California Arrow later in 1904 and the wind tunnel was the first of its kind on the west coast of America.
- 9–11 May – The Imperial Russian Navy armored cruiser Rossia carries a balloon on a raiding cruise against Japanese ships into the Sea of Japan in the first use by a warship of a balloon on the high seas in wartime. The balloon makes 13 successful ascents before it breaks its mooring lines and is damaged after landing on the sea.
- 23 May – The Wright brothers make their first flight attempt in the Wright Flyer II. They are not successful.
- 25 May – In Tandil, Argentina, Guido Dinelli flies his "Aeroplano apparatus" glider attached to a bicycle for 180 metres (590 ft).
- 26 May – The Wright brothers make their first successful flight in the Wright Flyer II. It is the first of 105 flights they will make in the Flyer II during 1904.
- June – The British Army tests Samuel Cody's person-carrying kites at Aldershot.
- June – John J. Montgomery makes a series of successful test flights with his tandem-wing glider design near San Juan Bautista, California as a prototype to his successful 1905 gliders that were used to make the first high-altitude flights in heavier-than-air flying machines in the world.
- August – An Imperial Japanese Navy observer in an Imperial Japanese Army kite balloon spots fire for a naval shore battery against Russian ships in the harbor at Port Arthur during the Siege of Port Arthur. It is the first time in history that an observer in any kind of aerial device directs gunfire against a purely naval target.
- 3 August – Major Thomas Scott Baldwin demonstrates the first successful U.S. airship, California Arrow, at Oakland, California.
- 20 September – Wilbur Wright makes the world's first circuit flight, in the Wright Flyer II.
- November – The Imperial Russian Navy begins conversion of the passenger ship Lahn into an aviation ship named Russ capable of handling a spherical balloon and eight kite balloons and of supporting aerial photography. Russ is the first self-propelled, seagoing ship intended specifically for aeronautical services and the first ship to employ multiple aeronautic devices.
- 9 November – Wilbur Wright flies the Wright Flyer II a distance of 2.75 miles (4.43 km) near Dayton, Ohio, the first flight of longer than five minutes.
- Date not known – Horatio Phillips in the United Kingdom experiments with a slat-winged multiplane aircraft. It is a fully self-propelled, autonomous take-off fixed wing aircraft using an internal combustion engine and a single tractor propeller that includes its own wheeled landing gear and modern looking tail empennage. It flies for a short hop but is unstable.
