= Wright Flyer III =

Third powered aircraft built by the Wright brothers

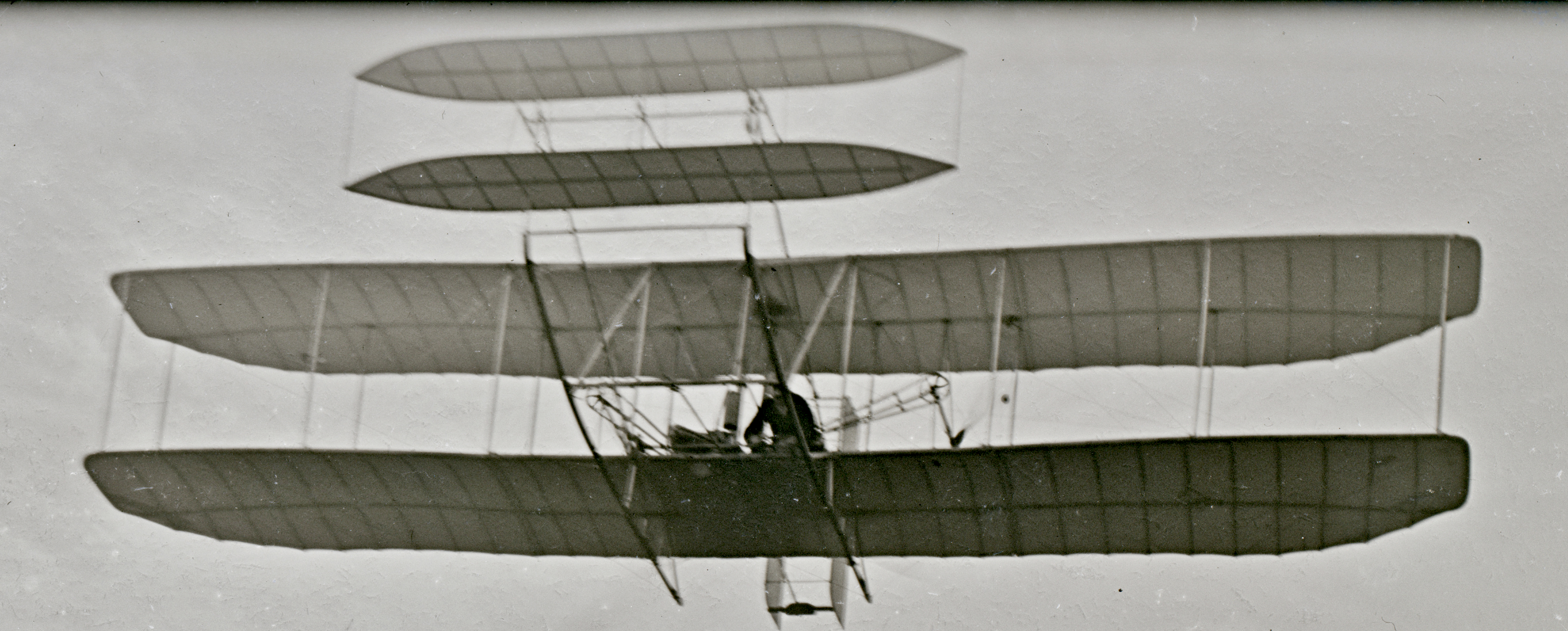
- The Wright Flyer III over Huffman Prairie, October 4, 1905 during its 46th flight. The front of the airplane is at the top of the photo.

General information
- Type: Experimental airplane
- National origin: United States
- Designer: Orville and Wilbur Wright
- Status: Preserved
- Number built: 1

History
- First flight: June 23, 1905
- Retired: 1908
- Developed from: Wright Flyer II
- Preserved at: Dayton Aviation Heritage National Historical Park

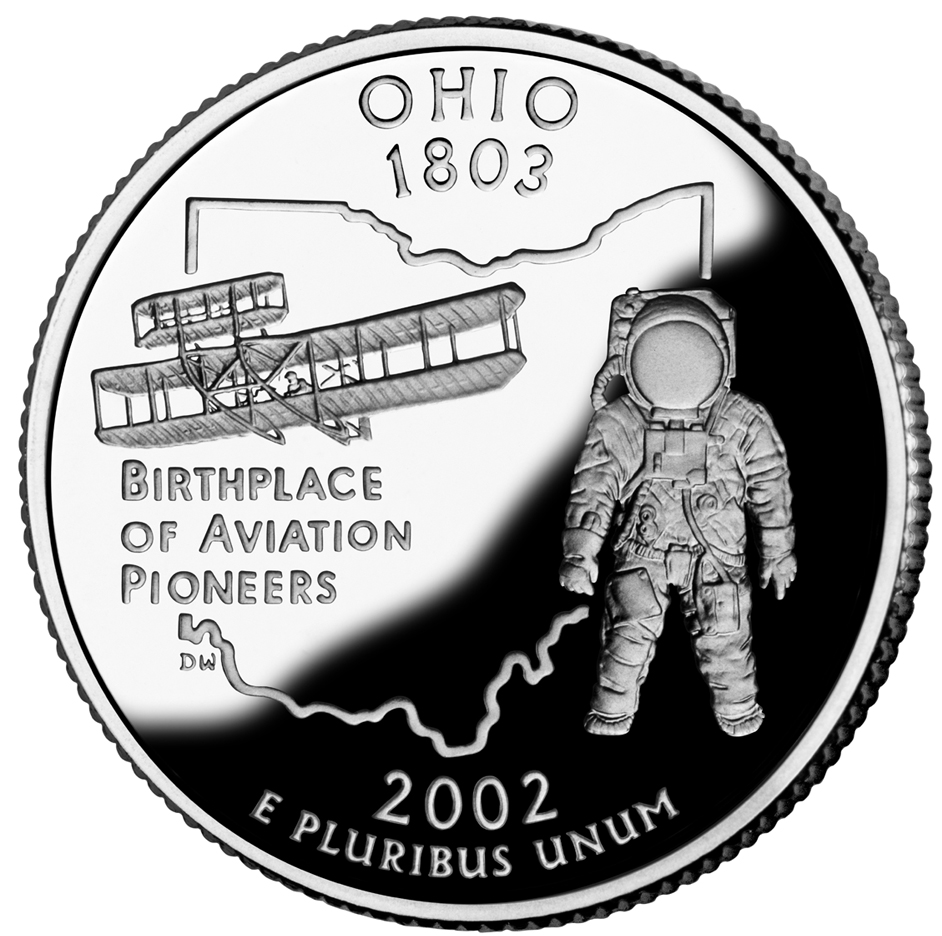
Ohio's 50 State Quarter features the 1905 Wright Flyer III, built and flown in Ohio, as shown in the famous photo from Huffman Prairie.

The Wright Flyer III is the third powered aircraft by the Wright Brothers, built during the winter of 1904–05. Orville Wright made the first flight with it on June 23, 1905. The Wright Flyer III had an airframe of spruce construction with a wing camber of 1-in-20 as used in 1903, rather than the less effective 1-in-25 used in 1904. The new machine was equipped with the engine and other hardware from the scrapped Flyer II and, after major modifications, achieved much greater performance than Flyers I and II.

== Design and development ==
The 1905 flyer was made stronger, more durable, and with a longer tail to provide better directional stability and control. A larger cylinder bore engine provided more power, while a more effective leading edge, and efficient propellers, improved performance. The propeller blades were made longer and thinner, while according to Harry Combs, "...adding a backward sweep to the blades, calculated precisely to avoid the pressures of flight and to keep the blades free from distortion." Other modifications included vertical rather than horizontal cylinders for its 35-horsepower engine.

As initially built, the Flyer III looked almost the same as its predecessors, and offered equally marginal performance. Orville suffered minor injuries in a serious nose-dive crash in the machine on July 14, 1905. When rebuilding the airplane, the Wrights made important design changes that solved the stability problems of the earlier models. They almost doubled the size of the elevator and rudder, and moved them about twice the distance from the wings. They added two fixed half-moon shaped vertical vanes (called "blinkers") between the elevators (but later removed), and widened the skid-undercarriage which helped give the wings a very slight dihedral.

They disconnected the rear rudder of the rebuilt Flyer III from the wing-warping control, and as in most future aircraft, placed it on a separate control handle. They also installed a larger fuel tank, and mounted two radiators on front and back struts for extra coolant to the engine for the anticipated lengthy duration flights.

When testing of Flyer III resumed in September, improvement was obvious. The pitch instability that had hampered Flyers I and II was brought under control. Crashes, some of which had been severe, no longer occurred. Flights with the redesigned aircraft started lasting over 20 minutes. The Flyer III became practical and dependable, flying reliably for significant durations, and bringing its pilot back to the starting point safely, and landing without damage.

On October 5, 1905, Wilbur made a circling flight of 24.2 miles (38.9 kilometres) in 39 minutes and 23 seconds, over Huffman Prairie, longer than the total duration of all the flights of 1903 and 1904. On 19 October 1905, the brothers wrote in a third letter to the U.S. War Department, "We propose to sell the results of experiments finished at our own expense."

=== Flying at Kill Devil Hills ===
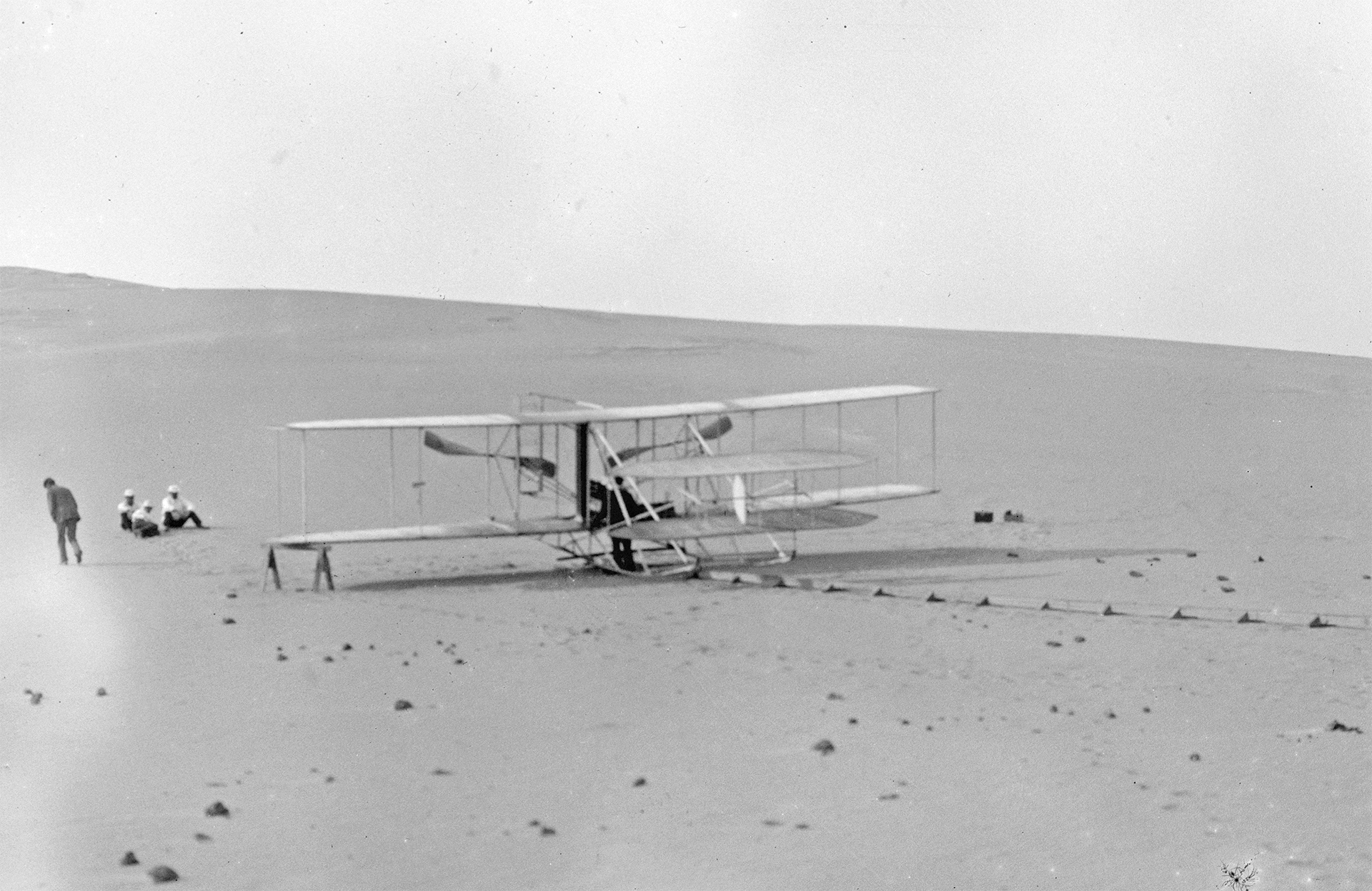
The Wright Flyer III in its two-seat configuration at Kill Devil Hills, North Carolina, in May 1908. Take-offs were made from the monorail launch track; the catapult and derrick were not used. This is the only surviving Wright brothers photo of the airplane in this configuration. A news photographer took a picture of the aircraft in flight from a distance, but very few details are visible.

To keep their knowledge from falling into competitors' hands, the Wrights stopped flying, and disassembled the airplane on November 5, 1905.

They returned to Kitty Hawk in May 1908 to flight test their modified 1905 flyer, which they equipped with upright hand controls and seats for the pilot and passenger. They were required by the Signal Corps to produce an airplane "capable of carrying two men and sufficient fuel supplies for a flight of 125 miles, with a speed of at least 40 miles an hour." They started flying on 6 May, were first witnessed flying by correspondents on 11 May, and flew their first passenger on 14 May.

On May 14, 1908, Wilbur flew mechanic Charles Furnas (1880–1941) 1,968 feet (600 metres) in 29 seconds, making him the first airplane passenger. The same day, Orville also flew with Furnas, this time 2,125 feet (648 metres) in 4 minutes 2 seconds. Orville's flight with Furnas was seen by newspaper reporters hiding among the sand dunes; they mistakenly thought Wilbur and Orville were flying together. He is one of the few people to fly with both Wright brothers (their sister Katharine being another).

Later that day, Wilbur was flying solo when he moved one of the new control levers the wrong way and crashed into the sand, suffering bruises. The Flyer's front elevator was wrecked, and the practice flights ended. Due to deadlines for their upcoming public demonstration flights in France and Virginia, the Wrights did not repair the airplane, and it never flew again.

== Surviving aircraft ==
The Wright Flyer III was left in its damaged condition in the North Carolina hangar. In 1911, the Berkshire Museum of Pittsfield, Massachusetts, through one Zenas Crane, obtained most of the components from both the abandoned Flyer and the 1911 Wright glider, but never assembled or exhibited them. The parts of the 1905 aircraft remained in Massachusetts for almost forty years, until Orville requested their return in 1946 for the Flyer's restoration as a central exhibit at Edward A. Deeds' Carillon Park in Dayton, Ohio.

Some Kitty Hawk residents also possessed pieces of the 1905 airplane. Deeds and Orville also obtained many of these for the restoration. At the end of the 1947–1950 restoration process, craftsmen estimated that the 1905 aircraft retained between 60 and 85% of its original material. The 1905 airplane is now displayed in the Wright Brothers Aviation Center at Carillon Historical Park. The aircraft and display are part of the Dayton Aviation Heritage National Historical Park. The restored 1905 Wright Flyer III is the only fixed-wing aircraft to be designated a National Historic Landmark.

=== Found artifact ===
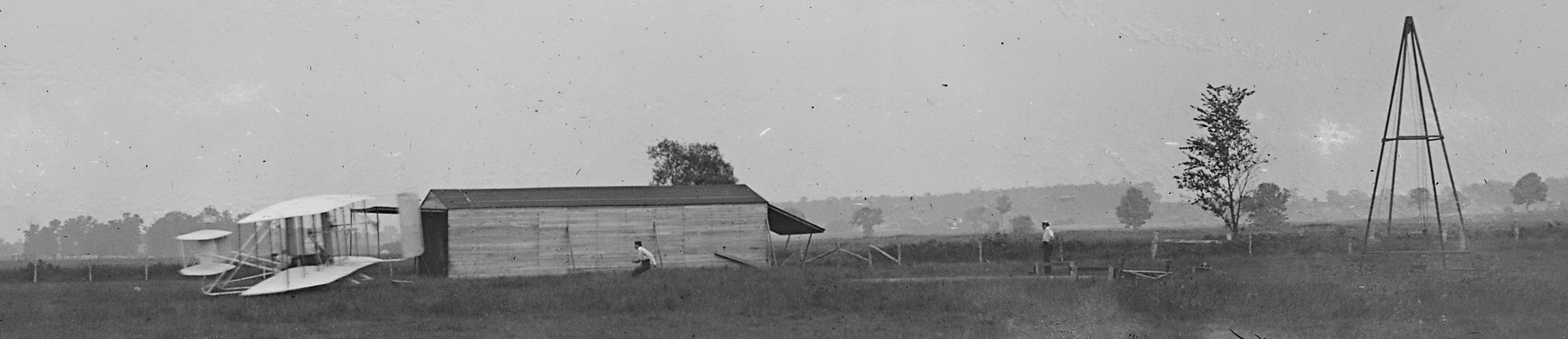
The start of the first flight of Flyer III, June 23, 1905, Orville at the controls. The catapult tower, which they began using in September 1904, is at right, photographed for the first time. It helped accelerate the aircraft to takeoff speed. The Flyer looks virtually identical to the previous two powered versions, but noticeably different from its later appearance, after the Wrights extended and enlarged the elevator and rudder. According to the Library of Congress: "The two figures in the center are probably Wilbur Wright and Charles E. Taylor," who was their mechanic and engine builder.

A historic missing piece of the Flyer III, thought to be a piece of the original Wright Flyer, turned up in 2010 in the hands of Palmer Wood, whose uncle, Thomas, had given him the piece in the 1960s. Wood took the piece to Brian Coughlin, an aircraft collector, who, not knowing what the piece was, took it to Peter Jakab of the Smithsonian Institution.

The missing piece is the actuator, which connects the moment chain or arm (the Wrights still used chain link in 1905) to the front elevator. In the 1940s, Orville gathered all of the stray pieces of the Flyer that were not in Massachusetts from Kitty Hawk locals who, as children, raided the Wrights' 1908 hangar for souvenirs. The actuator piece, which more than likely broke away in Wilbur's sand dune crash of May 14, 1908, somehow missed Orville's gathering efforts, and was replaced with a solid or flanged piece, which the Wrights did not start using until 1908.

According to Peter Jakab, the flanged piece is not accurate to the 1905 configuration of the Flyer III. The Wrights in 1905 used a wood assembly joined together by small flat plates and screws. The solid flat piece now on the Flyer was substituted in the 1947–1950 restoration for the missing actuator.

== Specifications (Flyer III) ==
- Wright Flyer III
- U.S. National Register of Historic Places
- U.S. National Historic Landmark
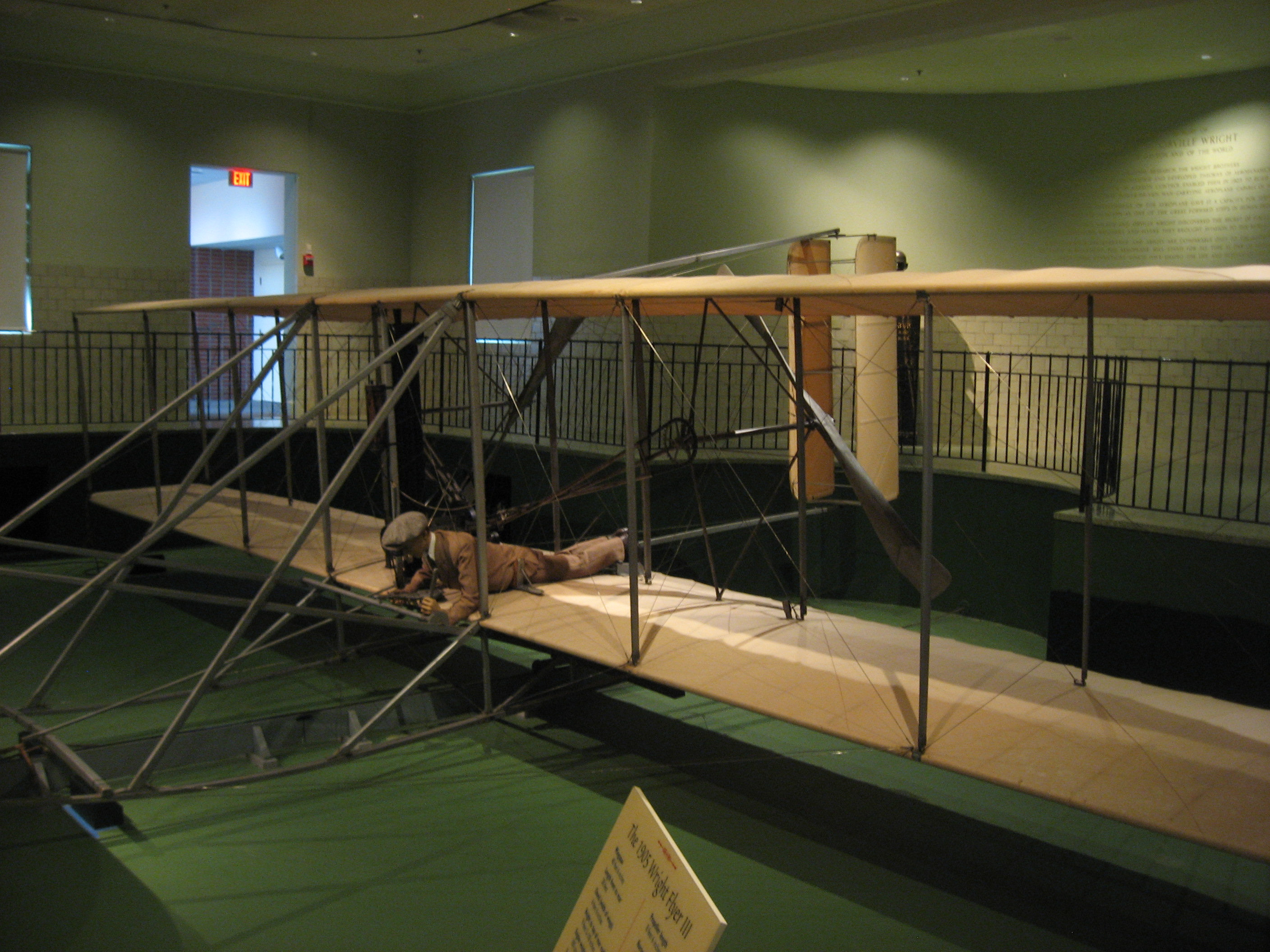
- Flyer III in the museum

- Location within Ohio Location within the United States
- Location: Dayton, Ohio
- Coordinates: 39°43′40″N 84°12′7″W
- Built: 1905
- Architect: Orville and Wilbur Wright
- NRHP reference No.: 90001747
- Added to NRHP: June 21, 1990

Data from Sharpe, 2000. p 311.

General characteristics

- Crew: one pilot
- Length: 28 ft 0 in (8.54 m)
- Wingspan: 40 ft 4 in (12.29 m)
- Height: 8 ft 0 in (2.44 m)
- Wing area: 503 sq ft (46.8 m^{2})
- Gross weight: 710 lb (323 kg)
- Max takeoff weight: 710 lb (323 kg)
- Powerplant: 1 × Wrights' water-cooled, 4-cylinder, inline engine, 20 hp (15 kW)
- Propellers: Wrights' elliptical propellers later changed to Wrights' "bent-end" propellers 2 per engine

Performance

- Maximum speed: 35 mph (56 km/h, 30 kn)
- Range: 25 mi (40 km, 22 nmi) as of October 1905
- Service ceiling: 50 to 100 ft (15 to 30 m) as of October 1905
- Wing loading: 1.4 lb/sq ft (7.0 kg/m^{2})
- Power/mass: 0.03 hp/lb (0.05 kW/kg)

== See also ==
- Early flying machines
- Wright Flyer III sculpture (Dayton, Ohio)

Related development

- 1902 Glider
- Wright Flyer
- Wright Flyer II
- Wright Model A
- Wright Model B
