= Torrence Huffman =

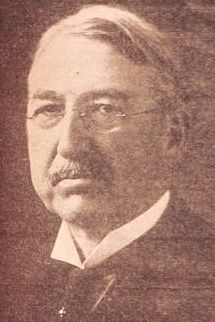
- Born: Torrence Huffman; March 20, 1855; Dayton, Ohio, U.S.
- Died: January 6, 1928 (aged 72); Dayton, Ohio, U.S.
- Resting place: Woodland Cemetery and Arboretum, Dayton, Ohio
- Occupation: Banker
- Children: William P. Huffman, Susannah B. Huffman, Geraldine B. Huffman, Charlotte T. Huffman
- Parent(s): Father, William P. Huffman

Torrence Huffman (1855–1928) was an American banker in Dayton, Ohio, who loaned pasture land to the Wright brothers where they perfected their first airplanes and started the first pilot training school. "As their flights grew ever longer in September and October 1905, local citizens and area journalists finally realized that something extraordinary was taking place in the sky over Torrence Huffman’s pasture," notes aviation historian Tom Crouch. The 84-acre field has since been known as Huffman Prairie and is designated a National Historic Landmark and part of Ohio's Dayton Aviation Heritage National Historical Park.

Born on March 20, 1855, in Dayton, Huffman was a “scion of one of Dayton’s oldest families and Ohio financier and manufacturer," according to the Dayton Daily News. His father was William P. Huffman, who had been the president of the Second and Third National Banks of Dayton.

Huffman joined the Fourth National Bank at its inception in 1888 and later served as its president for 30 years. He owned the Buckeye Iron and Brass Works and was involved in numerous other enterprises as an owner or director including the Dayton Street Railway and Columbia Insurance Company. He was also a director of Denison University and chairman of its finance committee.

Huffman died at his residence at 119 North Perry Street on January 6, 1928, after an illness of over a month.
