= 1984 in aviation =

This is a list of aviation-related events from 1984.

== Events ==
- Cirrus Aircraft founded

=== January ===
- Frontier Horizon, a low-cost subsidiary of Frontier Airlines operating Boeing 727-100s, begins flight operations.
- January 10 – A Balkan Bulgarian Airlines Tupolev Tu-134 strikes a power line and crashes on approach to Sofia Airport in Sofia, Bulgaria, in heavy snow, killing all 50 people on board.
- January 24 – A United States Air Force F-15A Eagle performs the first of five test launches of the ASM-135 anti-satellite missile. In this first launch, the missile does not carry its third stage, the Miniature Homing Vehicle (MHV) interceptor.

=== February ===
- February 1
  - In the Iran–Iraq War, Iraq threatens air and missile strikes against Iranian cities, including Abadan, Ahwaz, Dezful, Ilam, and Kermanshah, and warns their residents to evacuate.
  - Iraqi Air Force aircraft attack a convoy of four Cypriot cargo ships – Breeze, Neptune, Skaros, and City of Rio – in the Persian Gulf near the Iranian port of Bandar-e Emam Khomeyni. Missile hits set fire to Breeze and Skaros, and they are lost, and Neptune also catches fire but is not seriously damaged. City of Rio strikes a naval mine and runs aground.
- February 3 – Iran threatens air attacks against Basra, Kanaqin, and Mandali, Iraq.
- February 16
  - Iraqi Air Force aircraft raid the Iranian port of Bushehr, badly damaging the Liberian cargo ship Al Tariq with missile hits.
  - Iran launches a major helicopter- and waterborne assault against Iraqi forces in the Hawizeh Marshes.
- February 21 – 14 hours and 2 minutes after taking off from New York, Air France pilot Patrick Fourticq and his companion, race driver Henry Pescarolo, land their Piper Malibu in Paris, setting a world record for a trans-Atlantic flight by a single engined light aircraft.
- February 27 – Iraqi aircraft raid the Iranian oil terminal at Kharg Island.
- February 29
  - Iraqi helicopters apparently join artillery in attacking Iranian forces in the Ghuzail area with mustard gas.
  - American Airlines sets an industry record by ordering 67 McDonnell Douglas MD-80 airliners, with options to order 100 more in the future.
- Late February – Iraq threatens to attack any ship putting into the Iranian ports of Bushehr and Bandar-e Emam Khomeyni.

=== March ===
- March 1 – Iraqi Air Force aircraft attack a convoy of 15 merchant ships in the Persian Gulf on a voyage between the Iranian ports of Bushehr and Bandar-e Emam Khomeyni. Missile hits sink the Indian bulk carrier Apj Ankiba and set fire to the British 19,000-gross-ton bulk carrier Charming – which suffers a hit in her superstructure – and the Turkish cargo ship Sema-G. Charming runs aground, and Sema-G's crew abandons ship. Iraqi aircraft apparently have hit seven ships in the Persian Gulf since February 25.
- March 22 – A fire breaks out aboard Pacific Western Airlines Flight 501, a Boeing 737-235 with 119 people on board, during its takeoff roll at Calgary International Airport at Calgary, Alberta, Canada, after a faulty compressor disk breaks apart and pierces a fuel tank. Its pilot aborts the take off and all aboard evacuate the aircraft without fatalities, although 27 people are injured, five seriously. The airliner is badly damaged.
- March 27 – The Iraqi Air Force makes its first combat use of its newly acquired Dassault-Breguet Super Étendard strike fighters, when a Super Étendard fires an Exocet anti-ship missile at the 85,000-gross-ton Greek oil tanker Filikon L. – which the Super Étendard's pilot apparently assumes is carrying Iranian oil but actually is carrying 80,000 tons of Kuwaiti oil – in the Persian Gulf south of Kharg Island. The missile strikes the ship but fails to detonate, and she suffers only minor damage.
- March 28 – Iraq formally announces that it has used the Exocet missile for the first time in its attack on Filikon L. Iraq has about 200 Exocet missiles.
- March 29 – The Iraqi Air Force conducts a missile strike against the 16,000-gross-ton Greek cargo ship Iapetos at the head of the Persian Gulf. She catches fire and her crew abandons ship.

=== April ===
- April 18 – An Iraqi Air Force missile strike slightly damages the empty 52,000-gross-ton Panamanian oil tanker Robert Star in the Persian Gulf while she is on her way to the Iranian oil terminal at Kharg Island.
- April 25 – The Iraqi Air Force conducts a missile attack against the 357,000-gross-ton Saudi oil tanker Safina-al-Arab, carrying 340,000 tons of Iranian crude oil in the Persian Gulf south of Kharg Island. A missile blows a large hole in the ship's side and ignites a fire which burns for two days and consumes 10,000 tons of oil. The ship is declared a constructive total loss.
- April 27 – An Iraqi Air Force missile attack slightly damages the 179,000-gross-ton Liberian cargo ship Sea Eagle in the Persian Gulf near the Iranian port of Bandar-e Emam Khomeyni.
- April 29 – Trans World Airlines starts services to ten new cities in one day, the largest single-day expansion in its history.

=== May ===
- Due to the expiration of a bilateral air traffic agreement between Peru and the United States in November 1983 and disagreements between the two countries over "fifth freedom rights" – which allow an airline to carry revenue traffic between foreign countries as a part of services connecting the airline's own country – commercial air traffic between the two countries is suspended. It will not resume until mid-1985.
- May 7 – An Iraqi Air Force missile attack against the 118,000-gross-ton Saudi oil tanker Al-Ahood, carrying 114,000 tons of Iranian crude oil in the Persian Gulf near Kharg Island. The missile strikes the ship's accommodation area near her engine room and starts a fire that consumes 35,000 tons of oil and burns for five days, extensively damaging the ship. One of her crewmen is killed.
- May 13
  - An Iraqi Air Force missile attack causes slight damage to the 69,000-gross-ton Iranian oil tanker Tabriz, carrying a full load of Iranian oil in the Persian Gulf south of Kharg Island.
  - The Islamic Republic of Iran Air Force makes its first reported attack against commercial shipping. After an Iranian reconnaissance aircraft sights the 80,000-gross-ton Kuwaiti oil tanker Umm al-Casbah, carrying 77,000 tons of Kuwaiti crude oil, in the Persian Gulf south of Kuwait, an F-4 Phantom II fires two rockets at the ship, both of which strike her deck.
- May 14
  - Two Islamic Republic of Iran Air Force F-4 Phantom II fighter-bombers attack the empty Kuwaiti oil tanker Bahrah, which is in the Persian Gulf on a voyage to Kuwait, firing five rockets at her. Three rockets hit, blowing a large hole in Bahrah's side and starting a fire that burns for eight hours. Two crewmen are injured. Bahrah proceeds to Kuwait under her own power.
  - An Iraqi Air Force missile strike hits the empty 62,000-ton Panamanian oil tanker Esperanza II while she is in the Persian Gulf on a voyage to Kharg Island. A fire burns out her engine room and accommodation section.
- May 16 – Two Iranian F-4 Phantom II fighter-bombers circle the 215,000-gross-ton Saudi oil tanker Yanbu Pride, carrying 120,000 tons of Saudi crude oil in the Persian Gulf within Saudi Arabia's territorial waters near the port of Jubail, to identify her, then fire five rockets at her. Two rockets strike Yanbu Pride, causing explosions and starting a fire in one of her holds that is quickly extinguished.
- May 18 – An Iraqi Air Force missile attack sinks the 17,000-ton Panamanian bulk carrier Fidelity in the Persian Gulf near the Iranian port of Bushehr.
- May 19 – Iraq begins a five-day suspension of attacks on shipping in the Persian Gulf as part of an effort to negotiate a peace settlement with Iran. After the effort fails, Iraqi strikes resume on May 24.
- May 24
  - The Iraqi Air Force conducts a missile strike against the fully loaded, 140,000-ton Panamanian oil tanker Arizona in the Persian Gulf south of Kharg Island, narrowly missing her.
  - Two Iranian F-4 Phantom II fighter-bombers fire rockets at the empty 29,000-gross-ton Liberian tanker Chemical Venture in Saudi Arabia's territorial waters near the port of Jubail, striking her superstructure and starting a fire which burns out her pilothouse before it is extinguished. Ten of Chemical Venture's crewmen are injured.
- May 25 – An Iraqi Air Force missile attack hits the 19,000-ton Liberian bulk carrier Savoy Dean in the Persian Gulf.

=== June ===
- June 3
  - The Iraqi Air Force attacks the empty 153,000-gross-ton Turkish oil tanker Buyuk Hun, bound for the Iranian oil terminal at Kharg Island, in the Persian Gulf 50 nautical miles (93 kilometres) south of the island. The missile strikes Buyuk Hun in her accommodation section, killing three of her crewmen, and she has to be taken under tow by an Iranian tugboat. In response, the Islamic Republic of Iran Air Force begins patrols over the southern Persian Gulf, and Saudi Arabia announces the "Fahd Line," a line well beyond Saudi territorial waters within which F-15 Eagles of the Royal Saudi Air Force, guided by United States Air Force E-3A Senry Airborne Warning and Control System (AWACS) aircraft and refueled by U.S. Air Force KC-10 Extender tankers, will intercept any aircraft threatening merchant ships.
  - During an air show at Großostheim, West Germany, a Hawker Siddeley Harrier GR3 loses thrust at an altitude of 90 feet (27 meters) after launching vertically for a demonstration flight, crashes next to the runway, and bursts into flames about 100 feet (30 meters) away from the audience. Although the pilot ejects safely, the falling ejection seat kills a spectator.
- June 5
  - Saudi F-15s, guided by U.S. Air Force E-3A Sentry aircraft, shoot down an Iranian jet flying over Saudi territorial waters. Iran ceases air operations over Saudi waters and never again challenges Saudi air defenses.
  - Iraqi aircraft strike Banneh, Iran.
- June 6 – Iraqi aircraft raid Dezful, Masjid-e Suleiman, and Nahavand, Iran.
- June 10 – An Islamic Republic of Iran Air Force F-4 Phantom II attacks the empty 295,000-ton Kuwaiti oil tanker Kazimah in the Persian Gulf east of Qatar, dropping bombs which all miss. The F-4 follows up with a rocket attack which hits Kazimah but inflicts only slight damage and injures none of her crew.
- June 16 – Frontier Airlines pilot Emily Warner and co-pilot Barbara Cook make history by directing the first all-female commercial airline crew, on a flight from Denver, Colorado, to Lexington, Kentucky].
- June 22
  - Richard Branson's Virgin Atlantic, begins services from London, England, to Newark, using Boeing 747s.
  - The Rutan Voyager makes its first flight.
- June 24 – The Iraqi Air Force attacks Kharg Island, damaging oil facilities at Sea Island on the western side of the island. One missile strikes the 152,000-gross-ton Greek oil tanker Alexander the Great, which is fully loaded with Iranian oil, penetrating an oil tank but failing to explode.
- June 27 – The Iraqi Air Force attacks the 260,000-gross-ton Kuwaiti oil tanker Tiburon, carrying 250,000 tons of Iranian oil, in the Persian Gulf southeast of Kharg Island, hitting her in the engine room with a missile. A fire with 100-foot- (30-meter)-tall flames breaks out and spreads to Tiburon's accommodation area and destroys the ship's entire superstructure and funnel but does not burn any of her cargo. Eight crewmen die and three suffer serious injuries. The ship is towed to Bahrain.

=== July ===
- July 1 – An Iraqi Air Force missile attack damages the 6,200-gross-ton South Korean cargo ship Wonju-Ho in the Persian Gulf while she is on a voyage to the Iranian port of Bandar-e Emam Khomeyni and seriously damages the 13,000-gross-ton Greek cargo ship Alexander-Dyo. Two crewmen die and four suffer injuries.
- July 3 – Air Florida suspends all its flights after declaring bankruptcy.
- July 5 – Islamic Republic of Iran Air Force jets hit the Japanese-owned Liberian-registered supertanker Primrose with two rockets in the Persian Gulf. Primrose suffers no important damage and continues her voyage at full speed.
- July 10 – An Iranian reconnaissance aircraft sights the British oil tanker British Renown while she is in international waters in the Persian Gulf 70 nautical miles (130 kilometres) northwest of Bahrain on her way to pick up crude oil from the Liberian tanker Tiburon, which had been heavily damaged by an Iraqi missile on June 27, and apparently mistakes her for another ship. An Iranian F-4 Phantom II arrives and fires two rockets at British Renown, one of which bounces off her deck while the other hits her oil-loading equipment and starts a small fire which her crew soon puts out.
- July 25
  - Xiamen Airlines – the future XiamenAir – is established.
  - Since June 23, Iraq has launched four series of attacks on commercial shipping in the Persian Gulf.

=== August ===
- August 5 – A Biman Bangladesh Airlines Fokker F27-600 (registered S2-ABJ) crashed into a marsh near Zia International Airport in Dhaka. The aircraft was performing a scheduled domestic passenger flight between Chittagong Patenga Airport, Chittagong and Zia International Airport, Dhaka. The crash was a controlled flight into terrain caused by bad weather. With a total death toll of 49 people, it is the deadliest aviation disaster to occur on Bangladeshi soil.
- August 7 – An Iraqi Air Force missile attack slightly damages the fully loaded 123,000-gross-ton Greek oil tanker Friendship L. in the Persian Gulf 30 nautical miles (56 kilometres) south of Kharg Island. A missile pierces one of Friendship L.'s oil tanks and starts a small fire which spreads to her engine room and accommodation area, but is quickly extinguished.
- August 15 – An Islamic Republic of Iran Air Force jet fires two rockets at the empty 89,000-gross-ton Pakistani oil tanker while she is in the Persian Gulf on a voyage to Saudi Arabia. They both miss.
- August 18 – An Iranian jet fires rockets at the 47,000-gross-ton Panamanian tanker Endeavor, fully loaded with Kuwaiti oil, 100 nautical miles (190 kilometres) east of Bahrain. One rocket starts a small fire which Endeavor's quickly extinguishes, and she proceeds to Dubai.
- August 24 – An Iraqi Air Force attack succeeds in hitting the 53,000-gross-ton Cypriot oil tanker Amethyst, carrying 50,000 tons of Iranian crude oil, in the Persian Gulf south of Kharg Island. One of Amethyst's crewmen is killed. A fire spreads from the engine room to the accommodation area and some of the ship's oil tanks before tugboats put it out.
- August 27 – An Iranian jet hits the 21,000-gross-ton Panamanian tanker Cleo-1 with a rocket in the Persian Gulf 70 nautical miles (130 kilometres) northeast of Qatar while she is on a voyage to Saudi Arabia's oil terminal at Ras Tanura. The ship proceeds to Dubai.
- August 30 – While taxiing out for takeoff at Douala International Airport outside Douala, Cameroon, Cameroon Airlines Flight 786, a Boeing 737-2H7C with 116 people on board, suffers an uncontained compressor failure in its number two engine which starts a fire. All on board evacuate the plane, although the fire kills two of them after they exit the cabin. The aircraft is destroyed.

=== September ===
- September 4 – 61-year-old Elaine Yadwin, who is not a pilot, lands a Piper Cherokee Warrior II safely in Florida after her husband, the plane's pilot, dies during the flight.
- September 11 – An Iraqi Air Force Exocet anti-ship missile strikes the fully loaded 251,000-gross-ton Norwegian-owned, Liberian-registered oil tanker St. Tobias in the Persian Gulf 50 nautical miles (93 kilometres) south of Kharg Island, blowing a hole in her side and starting a small fire that is quickly extinguished. She heads for Abu Dhabi under her own power.
- September 12 – An Iraqi Air Force missile strike sinks the 500-gross-ton West German platform supply vessel Seatrans 21 in the Persian Gulf 50 nautical miles (93 kilometres) south of Kharg Island.
- September 14–18 – American Joseph Kittinger makes the first solo transatlantic balloon flight, from Carbon, Maine, in the United States to Savona, Italy.
- September 16 – An Iranian reconnaissance aircraft sights the Greek-owned, Liberian-registered 122,000-gross-ton oil tanker Medheron in the Persian Gulf on a voyage to the Saudi oil terminal at Ras Tanura, and the Islamic Republic of Iran Air Force attacks her with rockets her in the central Persian Gulf, destroying her bridge and part of her accommodation section and injuring three of her crewmen. She proceeds to Bahrain with serious damage. Iranian aircraft also fire rockets at the 127,000-gross-ton South Korean tanker Royal Colombo while she is in the Gulf on her way to Ras Tanura, hitting her in the engine room and injuring three crewmen, but she continues her voyage with only slight damage.

=== October ===
- October 2 – The United States Navy awards McDonnell Douglas a US$438 million contract to develop the T-45 Goshawk.
- October 8 – An Iraqi Air Force missile strike wrecks the engine room of the empty Liberian oil tanker World Knight in the Persian Gulf southwest of Kharg Island, to which she is headed, also setting fire to her crew accommodations. She is heavily damaged, with seven crewmen dead and five seriously injured.
- October 11
  - After a ground controller falls asleep on duty, Aeroflot Flight 3352, a Tupolev Tu-154, strikes several maintenance vehicles and crashes while landing at Omsk Tsentralny Airport in Omsk in the Soviet Union, killing 174 of the 179 people on board and four people on the ground.
  - Iranian aircraft attack the 21,000-gross-ton Indian tanker Jag Pari in the Persian Gulf while she is heading to Kuwait. She proceeds to Bahrain with minor damage and one injured crewman.
- October 12 – Iranian aircraft attack the 21,000-gross-ton Panamanian liquified natural gas tanker Gaz Fountain, fully loaded with 20,000 tons of pressurized propane and butane, in the central Persian Gulf, damaging her with three rockets. Her crew abandons ship, and she is declared a total loss.
- October 15 – Iraqi Air Force missiles set fire to the fully loaded 219,000-gross-ton Iranian oil tanker Sivand after she leaves the Iranian oil terminal at Kharg Island.
- October 19 – An Iranian F-4 Phantom II fighter-bomber fires rockets at the Panamanian-registered 1,538-gross-ton diving support ship Pacific Prospector in the southern Persian Gulf, setting her on fire and killing two people.
- October 24 – The first flight of PZL-130 Orlik, a Polish turboprop trainer aircraft, takes place.

=== November ===
- November 1
  - British Airways and some other international airlines begin relief flights carrying food and supplies to Ethiopia during a major famine there.
  - American Eagle Airlines begins operations.
- November 10 – Provincetown-Boston Airlines is grounded after the FAA withdrew its Air operator's certificate, claiming a number of violations of regulations. Following the resignation of its chief executive officer and vice president operations, operations by part of the airline's fleet resume on November 25.
- November 13 – A United States Air Force F-15A Eagle performs the second of five test launches of the ASM-135 anti-satellite missile and the first in which the missile carries its third stage, the Miniature Homing Vehicle (MHV) interceptor. The missile fails when the MHV is pointed at a star, simulating the targeting of a satellite.
- November 21 – The Israel Defense Forces, the Central Intelligence Agency, the United States Embassy in Khartoum, mercenaries, and Sudanese state security forces begin Operation Moses, a covert airlift of Jews of the Beta Israel community who had fled a famine in Ethiopia and were living in refugee camps in Sudan. Using Trans European Airways airliners, Operation Moses will carry around 8,000 Jews about 200 at a time in over 30 flights from Sudan to Israel via Brussels, Belgium, before it ends on January 5, 1985.
- November 25 – Capitol Air ceases operations. The airline, founded in June 1946, had become bankrupt after its owner, George Batchelor, had largely dismantled it in favor of his new acquisition, Arrow Air.

=== December ===
- December 1 – The United States National Aeronautics and Space Administration intentionally crashes a Boeing 720 as part of its Controlled Impact Demonstration Program at Edwards Air Force Base, California.
- December 3 – An Iraqi Air Force missile hits the empty 386,000-gross-ton Cypriot oil tanker Minotaur in the Persian Gulf while she is on her way to the Iranian oil terminal at Kharg Island, setting her engine room on fire. The fire is brought under control five hours later.
- December 4 – An Islamic Republic of Iran Air Force F-4 Phantom II fires rockets into a Kuwaitii supply boat operating in the Iraqi exclusion zone around Kharg Island.
- December 6 – Provincetown-Boston Airlines Flight 1039, an Embraer 110 Bandeirante, crashes on takeoff from Jacksonville International Airport at Jacksonville, Florida, after its tail section separates from the rest of the aircraft due to a maintenance error. All 13 people on board die in the crash and ensuing fire.
- December 9 – An Iraqi Air Force strike hits the empty 163,000-gross-ton Bahamian-registered oil tanker B. T. Investor in the Persian Gulf with an Exocet anti-ship missile while she is on her way to Kharg Island. Although the missile punches a hole in the ship's side, no fire occurs, damage is minor, and no one is injured.
- December 15 – An Iraqi Air Force strike hits the empty Greek oil tanker Ninemia with two missiles in the Persian Gulf while she is heading toward Kharg Island. The first missile starts a fire in her engine room, killing two crewmen, and she suffers heavy damage.
- December 17
  - An Iraqi Air Force missile strikes the Greek cargo ship Aegis Cosmic in her cargo hold in the Persian Gulf 85 nautical miles (157 kilometres) north of Bahrain, but she is only slightly damaged, her crew suffers no injuries, and she continues her voyage.
  - A United States Air Force C-5 Galaxy becomes airborne with 920,836 pounds (417,684 kg) aboard, setting a U.S. national record.
- December 21 – An Iraqi Air Force missile strike hits the 53,000-gross-ton Liberian-registered tanker Magnolia and the Norwegian supertanker Thorshavet 31 nautical miles (57 kilometres) south of Kharg Island. Aboard Magnolia, two crewmen die. Thorshavet, carrying 230,000 tons of Iranian oil, suffers heavy damage and 26 crewmen abandon ship.
- December 25 – Iranian aircraft damage the 277,000-gross-ton Indian tanker Kanchenjunga, bound for India fully loaded with Saudi crude oil she had loaded at Ras Tanura, with rockets in the Persian Gulf 70 nautical miles (130 kilometres) northeast of Qatar. Her bridge and control room catch fire and some of her crewmen are injured. She diverts to Dubai for repairs.
- December 26 – Iranian aircraft damage the empty 239,000-gross-ton Spanish supertanker Aragon in the Persian Gulf, hitting her with two rockets. She continues her voyage to the Saudi oil terminal at Ras Tanura.
- December 31 – During 1984, Iraq has conducted 35 air attacks against shipping in the Persian Gulf, all using air-to-surface missiles, while Iran has conducted 18 air attacks against Persian Gulf shipping.

== First flights ==
=== February ===
- February 6 – AIDC AT-3
- February 14 – Cessna Citation S/II
- February 15 – Cessna T-47
- February 24 – Boeing 737-300

=== March ===
- March 6 – Airship Industries Skyship 600
- March 19 – IAI Astra

=== April ===
- April 24 – Dornier SeaStar D-ICDS

=== May ===
- May 7 – Pilatus PC-9
- May 15 – AMX International AMX

=== June ===
- June 22 – Rutan Voyager
- June 28 – Fuji KM-2D

=== July ===
- July 4 – Bell Twin Ranger
- July 18 – Latécoère 225
- July 27 — Sikorsky S-75

=== August ===
- August 16
  - ATR 42
  - Harbin Y-12
- August 17 – Dornier Seastar
- Stits DS-1 Baby Bird

=== September ===
- September 13 – Lockheed S-3B Viking
- September 17 – Avtek 400 N400AV
- September 21 – Dassault Falcon 900
- September 29 — NAC Freelance

=== October ===
- October 5 — RTAF-5
- October 6 – FMA IA 63 Pampa
- October 12 – PZL-130 Orlik

=== December ===
- December 14 – Grumman X-29

== Entered service ==
- Bell 214ST
- Beriev A-50 (NATO reporting name "Mainstay") with the Soviet Air Forces

=== May ===
- May 12 – Airbus A310 with Air France.

=== June ===
- June 15 – Saab 340 with Crossair.

=== July ===
- July 2 – Mirage 2000 with Escadron de Chasse 1/2

=== December ===
- December 17 – Boeing 737-300 with Southwest Airlines

== Retirements ==
- Republic F-105 Thunderchief by the United States Air National Guard
- Tupolev Tu-126 (NATO reporting name "Moss") by the Soviet armed forces

=== March ===
- March 31 – Avro Vulcan

== Deaths ==
- April – Maxine (Blossom) Miles, aviation engineer (b. 1901)

== Deadliest crash ==
The deadliest crash of this year was Aeroflot Flight 3352, a Tupolev Tu-154 which crashed on landing in Omsk, Russian SFSR on 11 October, killing 174 of the 179 people on board, as well as four on the ground.
