= 1905 in aviation =

This is a list of aviation-related events from 1905:

== Events ==
- In Santa Clara, California, Daniel J. Maloney flies for 20 minutes with a glider after starting from a balloon at a height of 4,000 ft (1,200 m).
- U.S. Army Signal Corps transferred all balloon school activities to Fort Omaha, Nebraska.

=== January–December ===
- 18 January – The Wright brothers begin discussions with the United States Government about selling it an airplane.
- 16–20 March – Daniel Maloney is launched by balloon in a tandem-wing glider designed by John Montgomery and makes three successful flights at Aptos, California.
- 27 April – Sapper Moreton of the British Army's balloon section is lifted 2,600 ft (790 m) by a kite at Aldershot under the supervision of the kite's designer, Samuel Cody.
- 29 April – Daniel Maloney is launched by balloon in a tandem-wing glider designed by John Montgomery to an altitude of 4,000 feet (1,200 meters) before release and gliding at Santa Clara, California.
- 6 June – Gabriel Voisin lifts off of and flies along the River Seine in his float-glider towed by a motorboat.
- 23 June – The Wright brothers fly the Wright Flyer III for the first time. It is the first fully controllable and practical version of the original 1903 Wright Flyer.
- 18 July – Daniel Maloney launches a tandem-wing glider designed by John Montgomery at Santa Clara, California. A balloon cable damages the glider and upon release Maloney and the aircraft fall uncontrolled to the ground, killing Maloney. This is the third death of a heavier-than-air aircraft pilot after Otto Lilienthal in 1896 and Percy Pilcher in 1899.
- 5 August – Nineteen-year-old Welshman Ernest Willows makes the first flight of Willows No. 1 a semi-rigid airship he had built.
- 31 August –Balloonist John Baldwin accidentally killed during a premature dynamite/balloon stunt at County Fair, Greenville Ohio
- September – The Wright Brothers resume flight experiments with the re-designed Flyer III with performance of the airplane immediately in the positive. Smooth controlled flights lasting over 20 minutes now occur.
- 7 September – Flying circles over a cornfield near Dayton, Ohio, and chasing flocks of birds, Orville Wright records history's first bird strike. The dead bird lays on the airplane's wing before Wright makes a sharp turn and dumps it off.
- 4 October – Piloting the Flyer III over Huffman Prairie outside Dayton, Ohio, Orville Wright makes the first airplane flight in history of over 30 minutes in length.
- 5 October – Wilbur Wright makes a flight of 24.2 miles (38.9 km) over Huffman Prairie in the Flyer III. The flight lasts for 39 minutes 23 seconds.
- 14 October – The Fédération Aéronautique Internationale (FAI) is founded in Paris.
- 15 October – The Wright brothers record a flight of just over 24 miles (39 km) in 28 minutes in the Wright Flyer III.
- 16 October – The Wright brothers complete their 1905 test flight program, making their last flight until May 1908.
- 30 November – At Lake Constance, Count Ferdinand von Zeppelin's LZ2 airship is damaged significantly while attempting its first launch.
- December – Neil MacDermid is carried aloft in Canada by a large box kite named The Siamese Twins, designed by Alexander Graham Bell.
