= Wright Flyer II =

Second powered aircraft built by the Wright brothers

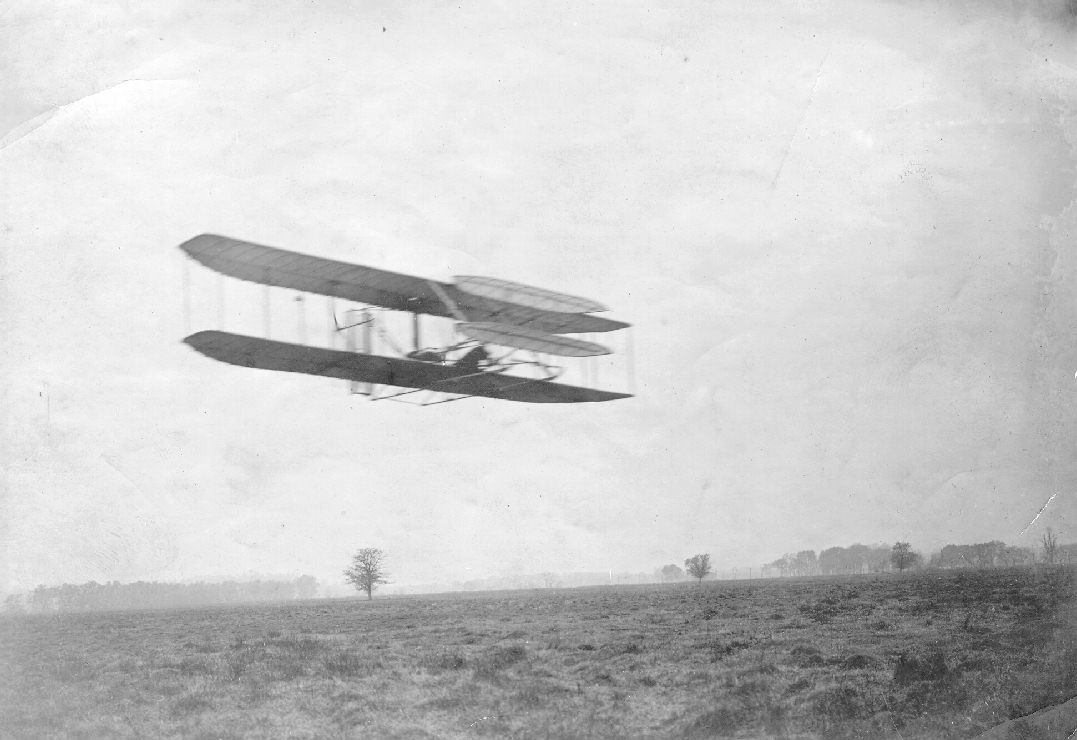
- Wilbur in Flyer II circling Huffman Prairie in November 1904. The front elevator has been enlarged and the radiator moved to a rear strut.

General information
- Type: Experimental airplane
- National origin: United States
- Designer: Orville and Wilbur Wright
- Number built: 1

History
- Developed from: Wright Flyer
- Developed into: Wright Flyer III

The Wright Flyer II was the second powered aircraft built by Wilbur and Orville Wright. During 1904 they used it to make a total of 105 flights, ultimately achieving flights lasting five minutes and also making full circles, which was accomplished by Wilbur for the first time on September 20.

== Design and development ==
The design of the Flyer II was very similar to the original 1903 Wright Flyer, but with a slightly more powerful engine and construction using white pine instead of the spruce they used in the 1903 machine and the gliders of 1900–1902. An important change was reducing the wing camber to 1-in-25 from the 1-in-20 used in 1903. The brothers thought that reducing the camber would reduce drag, though less lift was actually achieved. With these alterations Flyer II was heavier by some 200 pounds (91 kg) than the 1903 machine.

== Operational history ==
The Wrights tested the new aircraft at Huffman Prairie, a cow pasture outside of Dayton, Ohio, which is now part of Dayton Aviation Heritage National Historical Park and also part of the present-day Wright-Patterson Air Force Base. The owner of the land, banker Torrance Huffman, allowed them to use the land rent-free, his only requirement being that they were to shepherd the livestock to safety before experimenting. The Wrights began erecting a shed to house their aircraft during April and by the end of May were ready to begin trials, and an announcement was made to the press that trials would begin on Monday, May 23.

A crowd of around forty people, made up of family and friends and a dozen reporters, assembled on the Monday but rain kept the aircraft in its shed all morning, and when the rain cleared the wind had died away. There was little chance of a successful takeoff from the 100 ft (30 m) launching rail with no headwind. The Wrights decided to attempt a short flight to satisfy the press, but the motor did not develop its full power and the aircraft reached the end of the rail without taking off.

Work on the engine and poor weather delayed further attempts until the Thursday afternoon, when despite ignition problems a takeoff was attempted, and a flight of around 25 feet (7.6 m) was made, ending in a heavy landing which damaged the aircraft. Press reports were mixed: the Chicago Tribune ran its story under the headline "Test of flying machine is judged a success", while The New York Times headline was "Fall wrecks airship".

Repairs took two weeks, but the next flight attempt also ended in a crash, necessitating a further two weeks of repair work. On June 21 three flights without any breakages were achieved, but four days later the aircraft crashed again. These accidents were caused by the aircraft's pitch instability. Suspecting that this was caused by the center of gravity being too far forward, they moved the engine and pilot position back, but this made matters worse. The machine would undulate unless the front elevator was depressed, but this created additional drag, and so they added 70 lb (32 kg) of iron bars as ballast under the elevators, which were also enlarged. So modified, 24 flights were made in August, including two on August 22 of a quarter of a mile, the greatest distance that they could fly without having to make a turn.

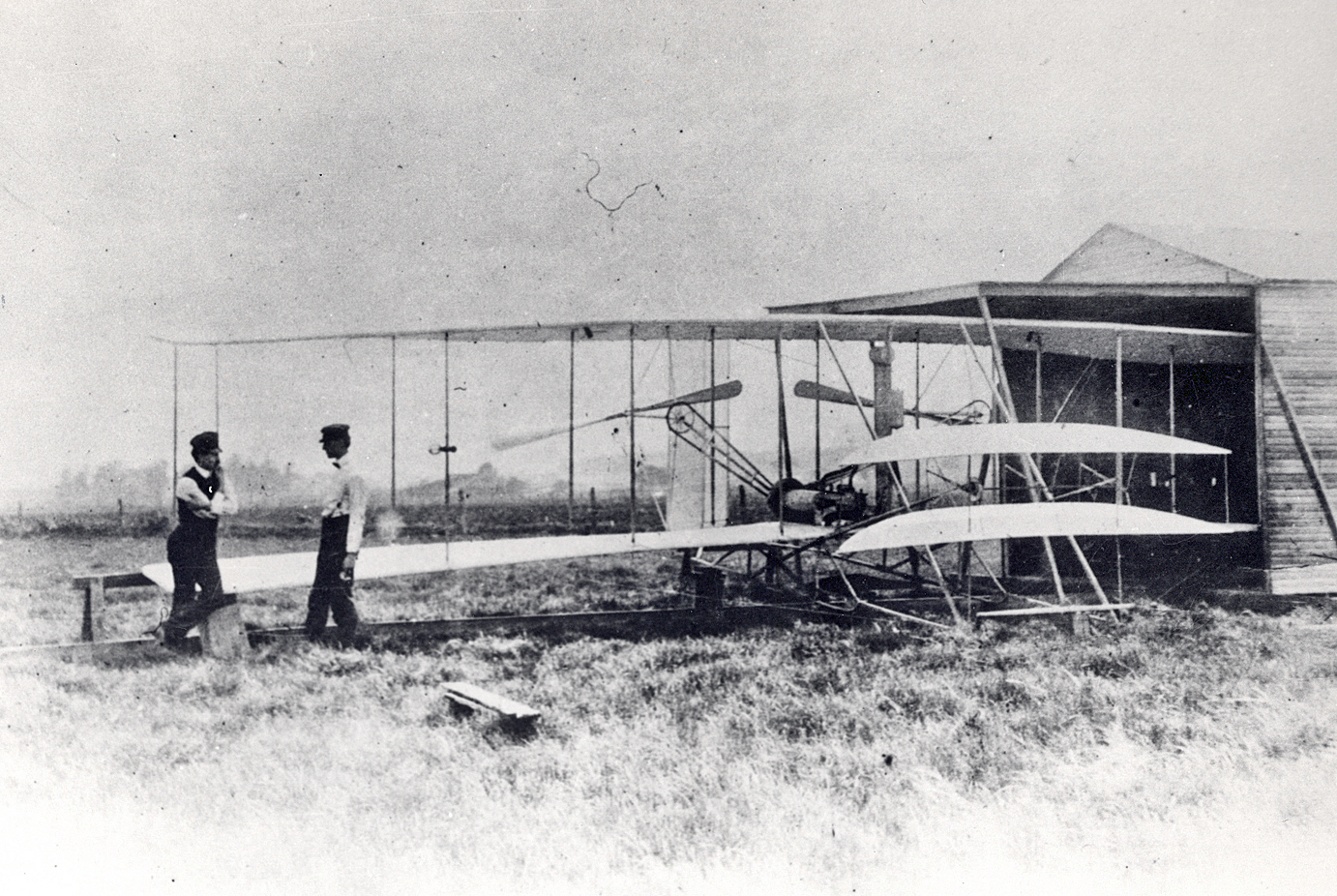
Orville (left) and Wilbur Wright with the Wright Flyer II at Huffman Prairie May 1904

Because wind strength and direction were less reliable than at Kitty Hawk, the men sometimes had to laboriously re-lay the 160 feet (49 m) of "Junction Railroad" launch rail to suit conditions. On 7 September the men began using a catapult to accelerate the aircraft to the speed necessary for takeoff. They used a falling weight of 800 pounds (360 kg), later increased to 1,600 pounds (730 kg), suspended from a 16 ft (4.9 m) high derrick, with a block and tackle to multiply the distance that the aircraft was pulled. Launched by the apparatus, Wilbur made his first turn in the air on September 15, and on September 20 he succeeded in flying a complete circle—the first ever by an airplane—covering 4,080 ft (1,240 m) in 1 minute 16 seconds. This flight was witnessed by Amos Root, who wrote an account in the January 1, 1905 issue of Gleanings in Bee Culture, a trade magazine he published.

On October 14 Orville made his first circular flight and the following day Octave Chanute arrived to view the Wright brother's progress. Unfortunately Orville, attempting another circular fight, was unable to straighten out and was forced to land the aircraft at high speed after only 30 seconds in the air, damaging the skids and propellers. A series of flights ending in damage to the aircraft followed, but the run of bad luck ended on November 9, when Wilbur flew four circuits of Huffman Prairie, staying in the air for five minutes and only landing because the engine was beginning to overheat. On December 1 Orville made a similar flight, and on December 9 they stopped flying for the year.

Harry Combs summarized the flights, "There were 105 flights made in 1904, almost all short flights, but the longest, on December 1, lasted for five minutes and eight seconds and covered a distance of 4515 meters, or about three miles. During this flight Orville circles Huffman Prairie two and a quarter times."

On January 18, 1905, the brothers wrote to congressman Robert M. Nevin, "The series of aeronautical experiments upon which we have been engaged for the past five years has ended in the production of a flying-machine of the type fitted for practical use. The numerous flights in straight lines, in circles, and over S-shaped courses, in calms and in winds, have made it quite certain that flying has been brought to a point where it can be made of great practical use in various ways, one of which is that of scouting and carrying messages in time of war."

The Wrights disassembled the airframe of the Flyer II during the winter of 1904–05. They salvaged the propeller chain drive, its mounts, and the engine. The tattered fabric, wing ribs, uprights and related wooden parts were burned (according to Orville) in the early months of 1905. The salvaged propeller parts and the engine went into the new airframe of the Wright Flyer III.

== Specifications (Flyer II) ==
General characteristics

- Crew: One
- Length: 21 ft 1 in (6.43 m)
- Wingspan: 40 ft 4 in (12.29 m)
- Height: 9 ft 0 in (2.74 m)
- Wing area: 510.0 sq ft (47.38 m^{2})
- Gross weight: 925 lb (419.57 kg)
- Powerplant: 1 × water-cooled straight-4 piston engine , 15 hp (11.2 kW)
- Propellers: Two 2-bladed Wright "Elliptical" props; port prop carved to counter-rotate to the left, starboard prop carved to rotate to the right

Performance

- Maximum speed: 35 mph (56 km/h, 30 kn)
- Range: 5.0 mi (8.0 km, 4.3 nmi)
- Service ceiling: 20 ft (6.0 m)
