= Huffman Prairie =

- Huffman Prairie Flying Field
- U.S. National Register of Historic Places
- U.S. National Historic Landmark
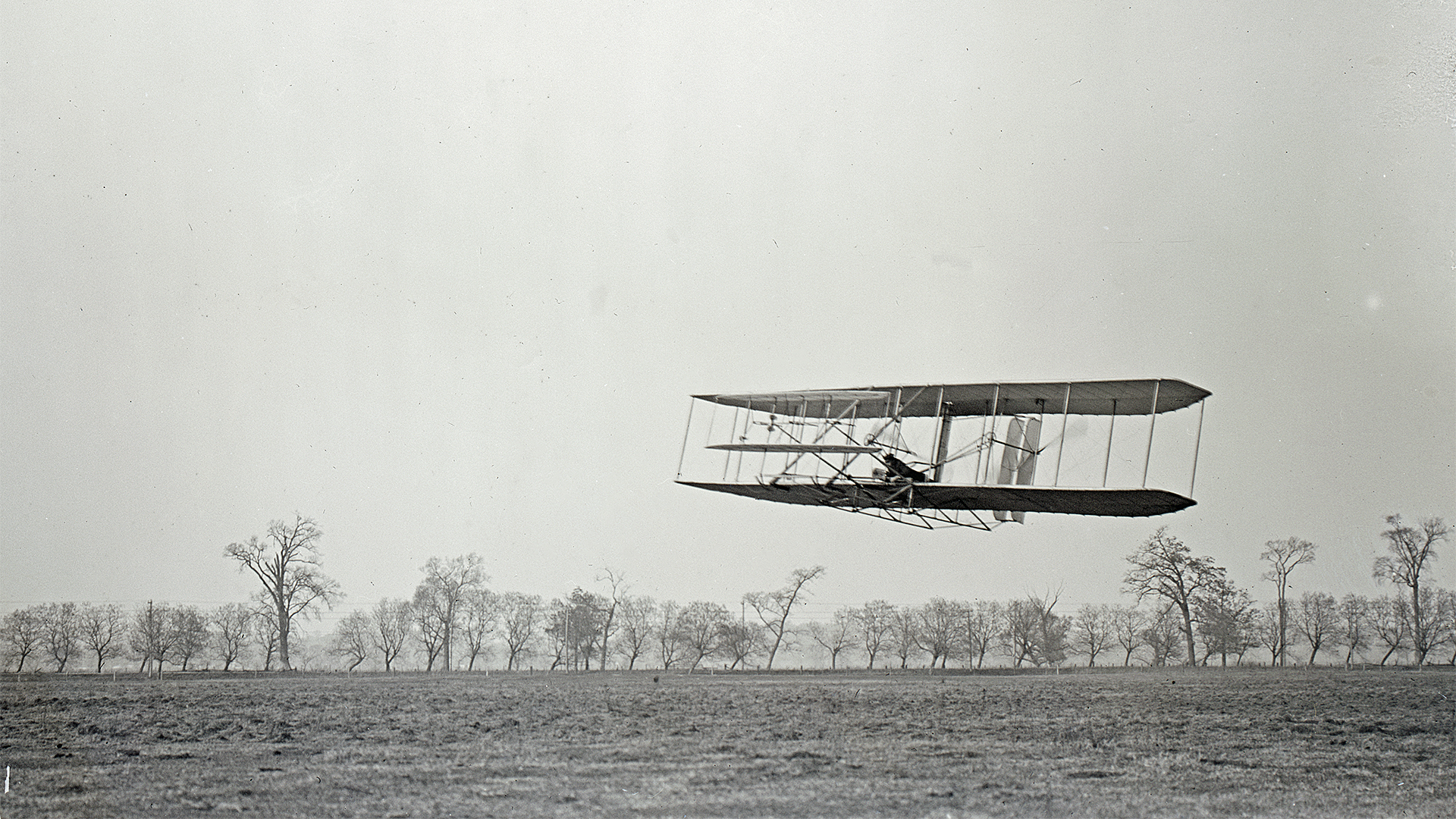
- Orville Wright in flight over Huffman Prairie, approximately 1,760 feet in 40 1/5 seconds, Nov. 16, 1904

- Location within Ohio Location within the United States
- Nearest city: Fairborn, Ohio
- Coordinates: 39°48′12″N 84°3′57″W
- Area: 84.4 acres (34.2 ha)
- Built: 1904
- Website: https://www.nps.gov/daav/learn/historyculture/huffman-prairie-flying-field.htm
- NRHP reference No.: 71000640

Significant dates
- Added to NRHP: May 6, 1971
- Designated NHL: June 21, 1990

Huffman Prairie, also known as Huffman Prairie Flying Field or Huffman Field, is part of Ohio's Dayton Aviation Heritage National Historical Park. The 84-acre (34-hectare) patch of rough pasture, near Fairborn, northeast of Dayton, is the place where the Wright brothers (Wilbur and Orville) undertook the task of creating a dependable, fully controllable airplane and training themselves to be pilots. Many early aircraft records were set by the Wrights at the Huffman Prairie.

== History ==
The Wrights began using Huffman Prairie in 1904 with the permission of the field's owner, Dayton banker Torrence Huffman. It was located near an interurban trolley stop called Simms Station, 8 miles (13 km) outside the brothers' hometown of Dayton. In April, they started testing their Wright Flyer II.

The Wrights made about 150 flights at the field in 1904–1905, leading to development of the 1905 Wright Flyer III, which they considered to be the first practical airplane. This aircraft has been restored, and is now displayed at the Carillon Historical Park in Dayton.

In 1910, the Wright Company placed its testing operations at Huffman Prairie Flying Field; the Wright Company also operated its Wright Flying School on the site. Through the Flying School, the Wright Company trained more than a hundred pilots, including the aviators for the Wright Exhibition Team and early military aviators, including Henry H. "Hap" Arnold and Thomas DeWitt Milling. The United States Army Signal Corps purchased the field in 1917 and renamed it, along with 2,000 adjacent acres (8 km^{2}), Wilbur Wright Field. In 1948 the area was merged with nearby Patterson Field to become Wright-Patterson Air Force Base.

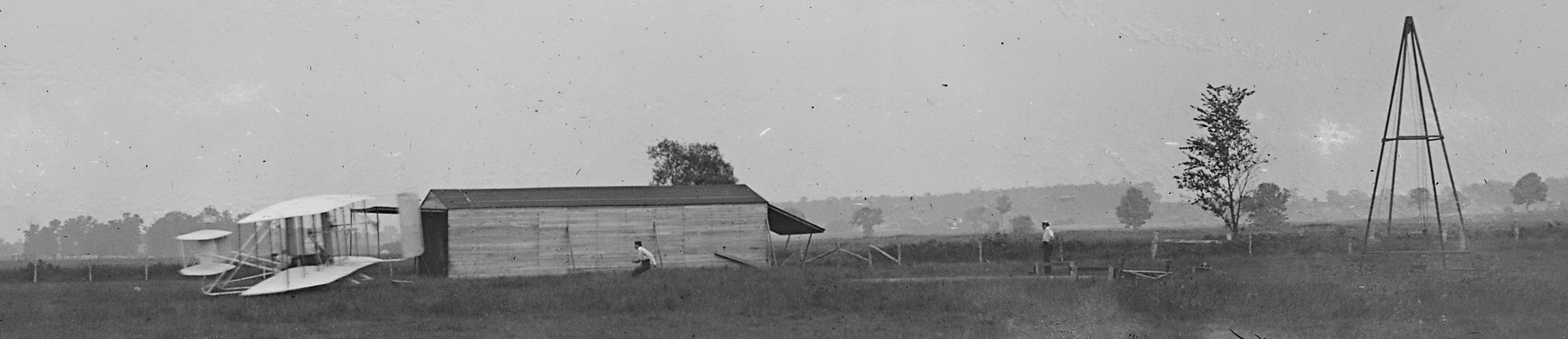
Start of the first flight of Flyer III, June 23, 1905, Orville at the controls. The catapult tower, which they began using in September 1904, is at right. It helped accelerate the aircraft to takeoff speed. The Flyer looks virtually identical to the previous two powered versions, but noticeably different from its later appearance, after the Wrights extended and enlarged the elevator and rudder. The two men are probably Wilbur (running behind the airplane) and Charles Edward Taylor (at right), the Wrights' mechanic who built their first aircraft engine.

== Huffman Prairie Flying Field Historic Site ==
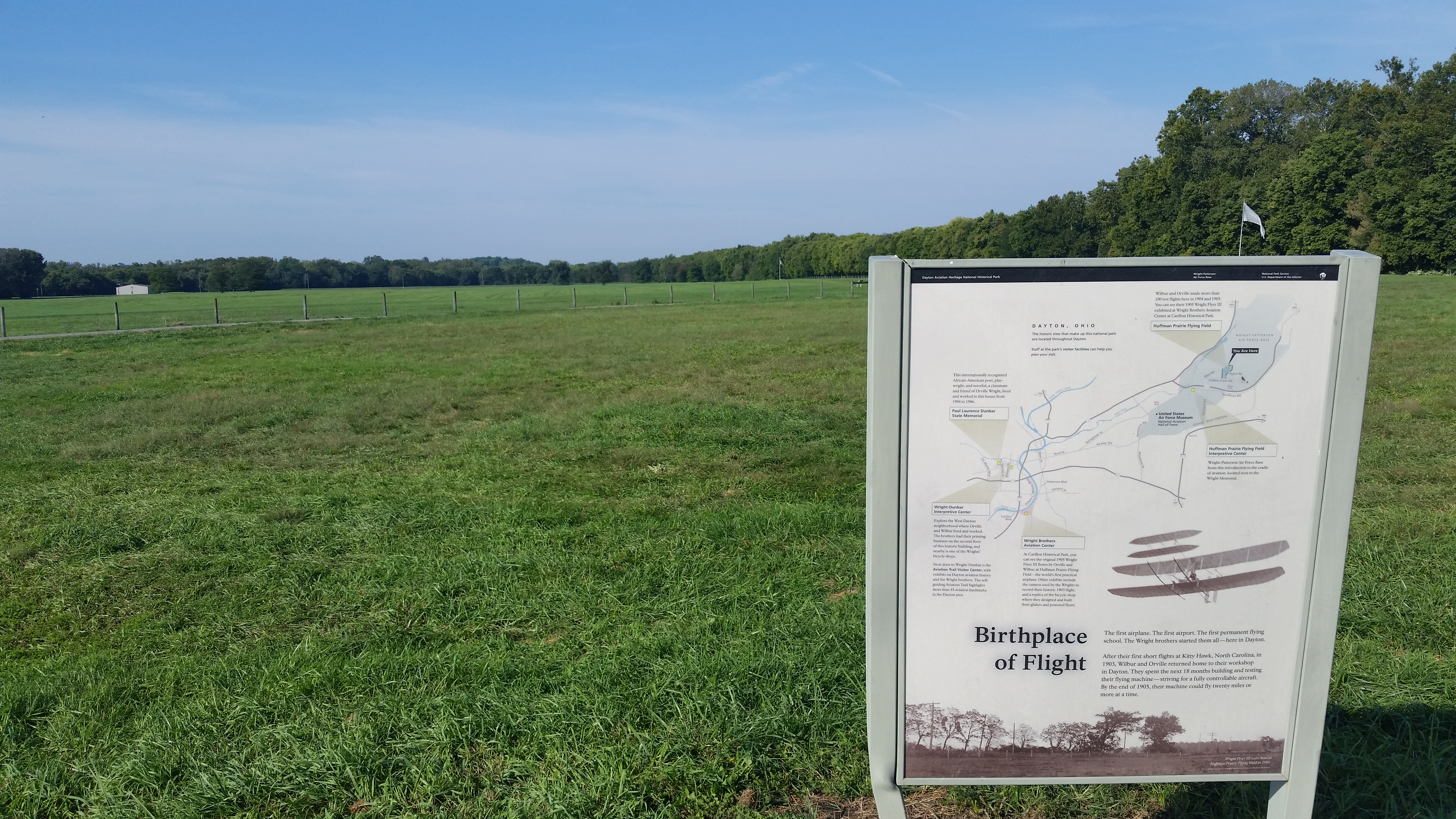
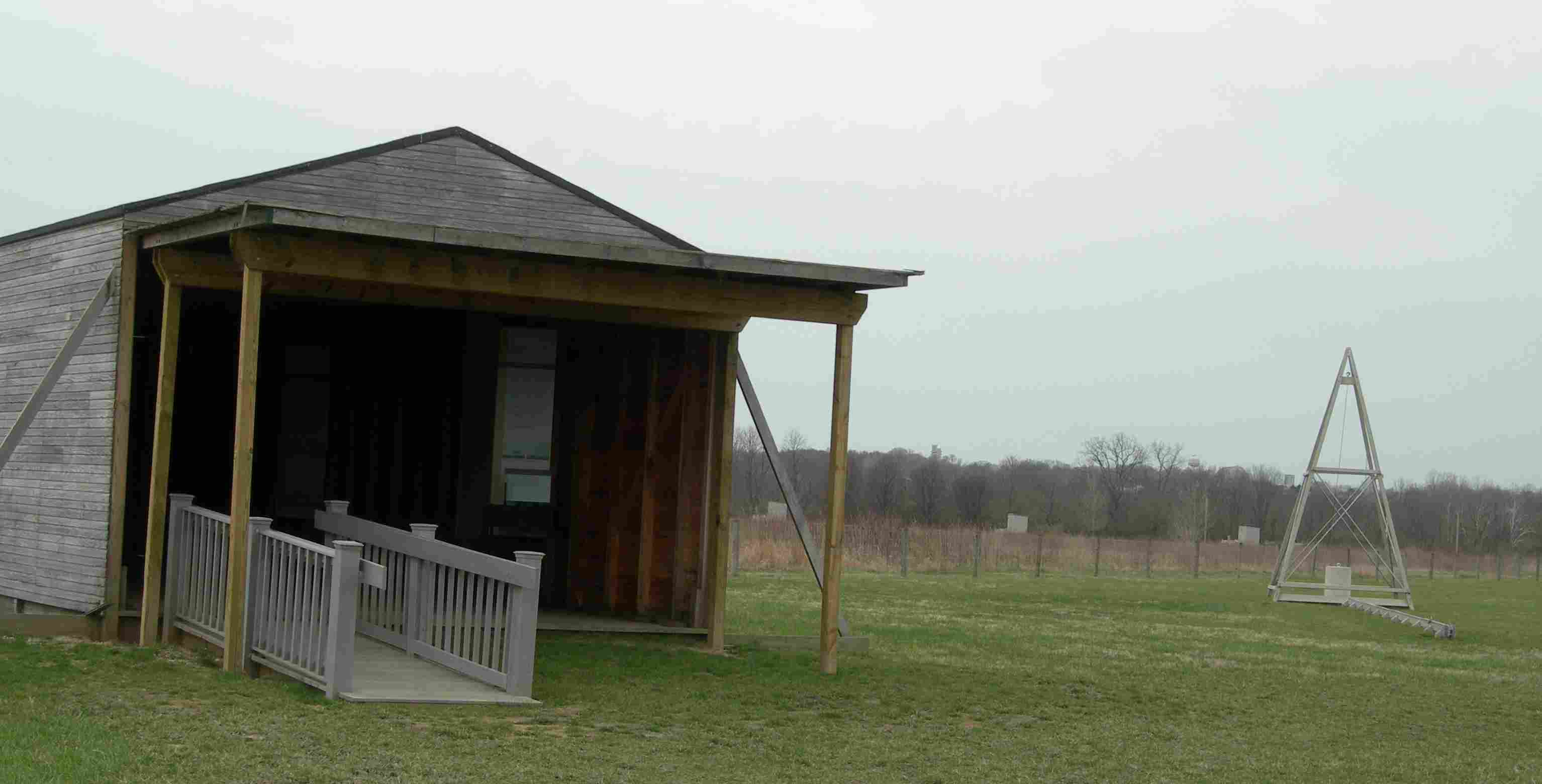
Birthplace of Flight marker (left), and reproduction of the Wright brothers' 1905 hangar and catapult (right)
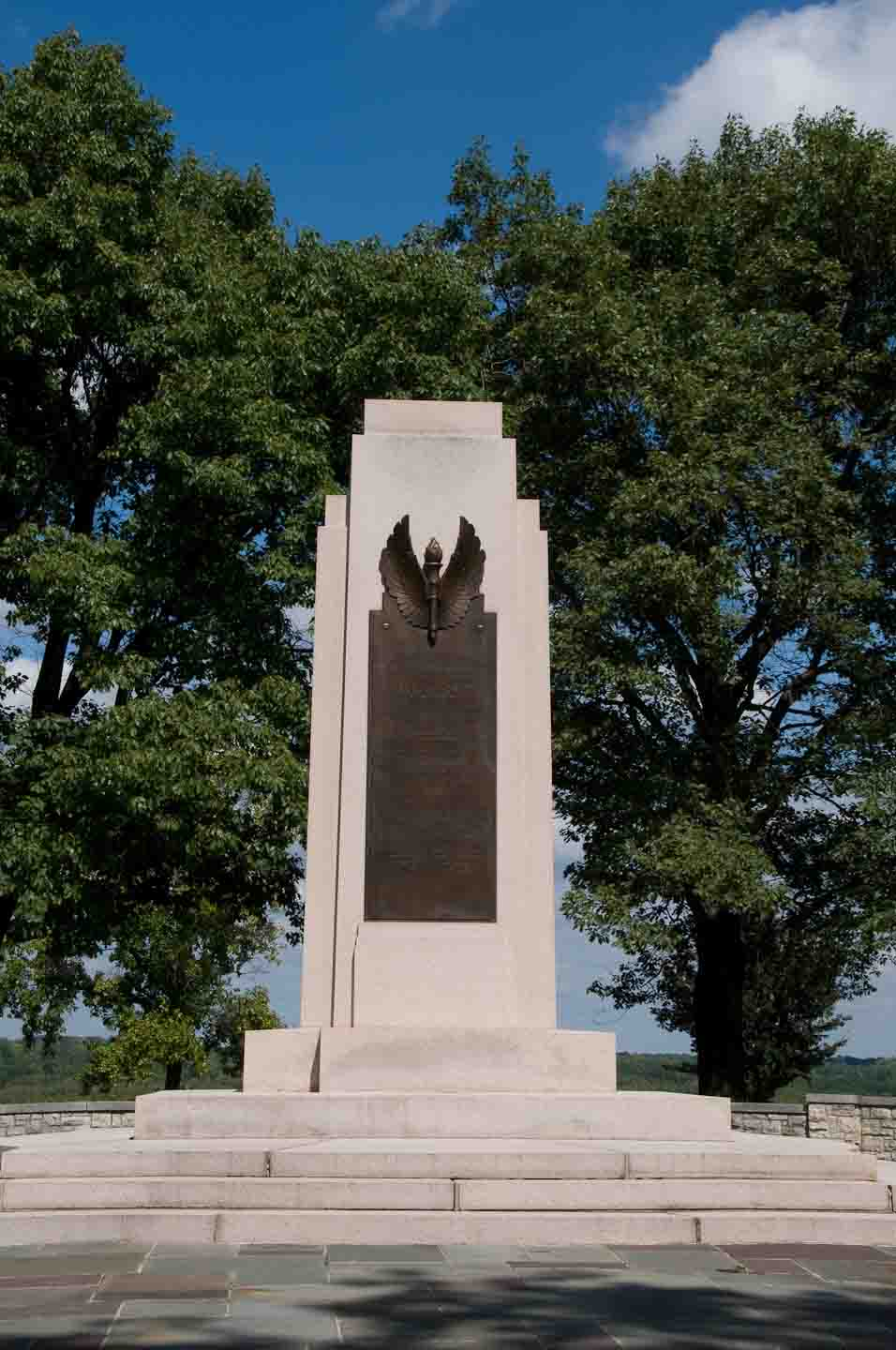
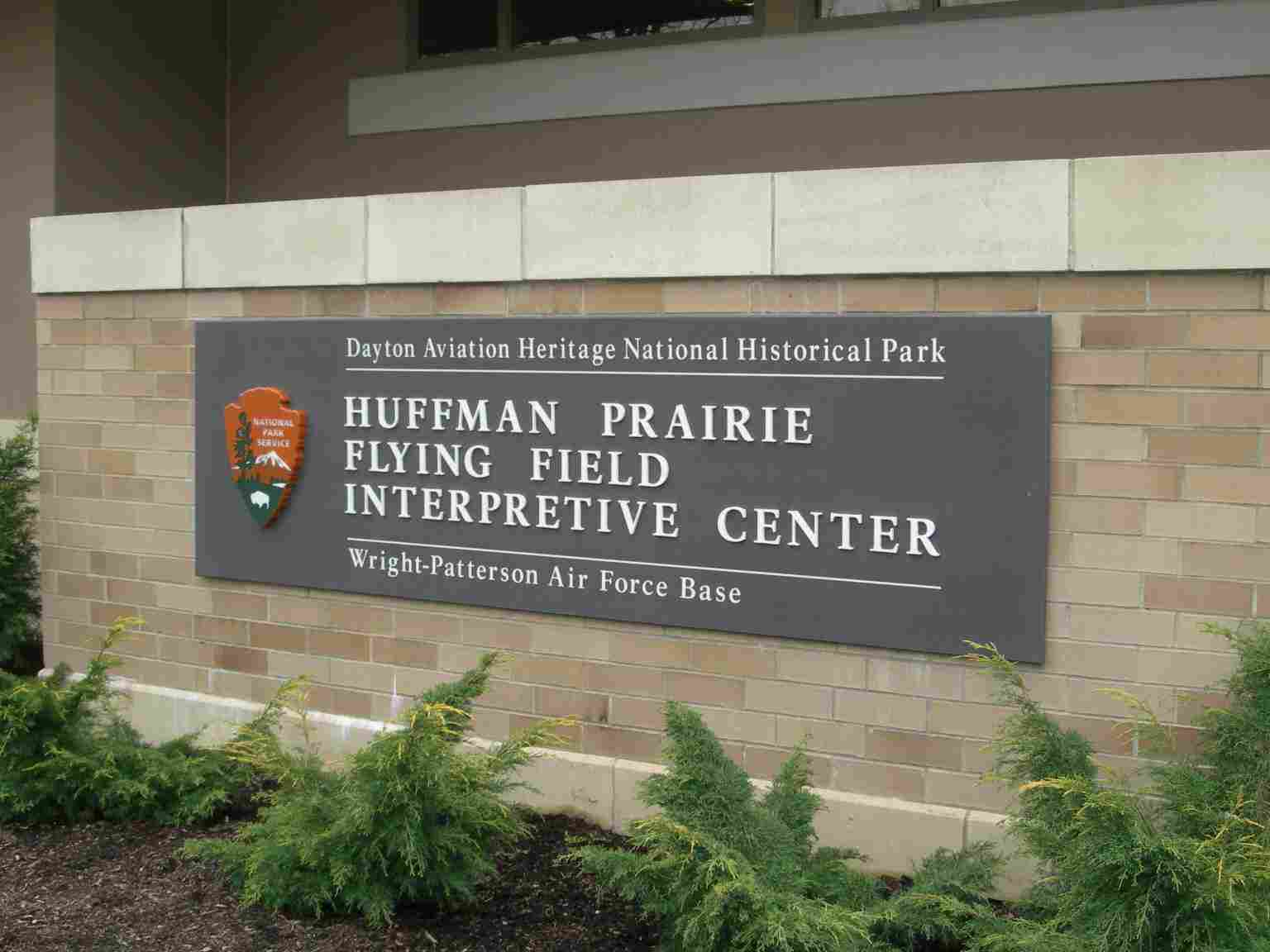
Wright Brothers Memorial, on Wright Brothers Hill (left) overlooking the Huffman Prairie, and Interpretative Center (right)

The National Park Service currently operates this historic site where visitors may see the place where the Wrights developed the world's first practical airplane as well as replicas of their 1905 hangar and launching catapult. While the historic flying field is mowed short, simulating the grazed pasture used by the Wrights and allowing its use for re-enactment flights, an adjacent area of tall-grass prairie is maintained unmowed, managed instead using late-season controlled burns. A nature trail winds among the prairie's tall grasses, diverse wildflowers, and occasional shrubs. The Huffman Prairie area is located within the Air Force Base, with a separate entrance and fencing between it and an adjacent runway and other modern base facilities.

The associated Huffman Prairie Flying Field Interpretive Center is located about 2 miles (3.2 km) from the flying field on Wright Brother Hill, near the Wright Brothers Memorial, overlooking Huffman Prairie and other parts of the Air Force Base. This National Park Service facility addresses the specific problems Orville and Wilbur Wright encountered while they were perfecting their flying machine, their first demonstration flights in the United States and in Europe, their exhibition team, and their manufacturing facility in Dayton, Ohio. The center contains a Wright Flyer flight simulator visitors can try out, highlights the continuing legacy of Orville and Wilbur Wright as embodied in the development of Wright-Patterson Air Force Base, and overviews the continuing aeronautical research at this Air Force facility.

Huffman Prairie Flying Field was designated as a National Historic Landmark in 1990, is one element of the Dayton Aviation Heritage National Historical Park and was added to the U.S. World Heritage Tentative List as part of the Dayton Aviation Sites listing in 2008. In 1986, 109 acres (44 ha) of the natural portion of the Huffman Prairie was designated as an Ohio Natural Area. It is a component of the National Aviation Heritage Area.
