= 1901 in aviation =

This is a list of aviation-related events from 1901:

== Events ==
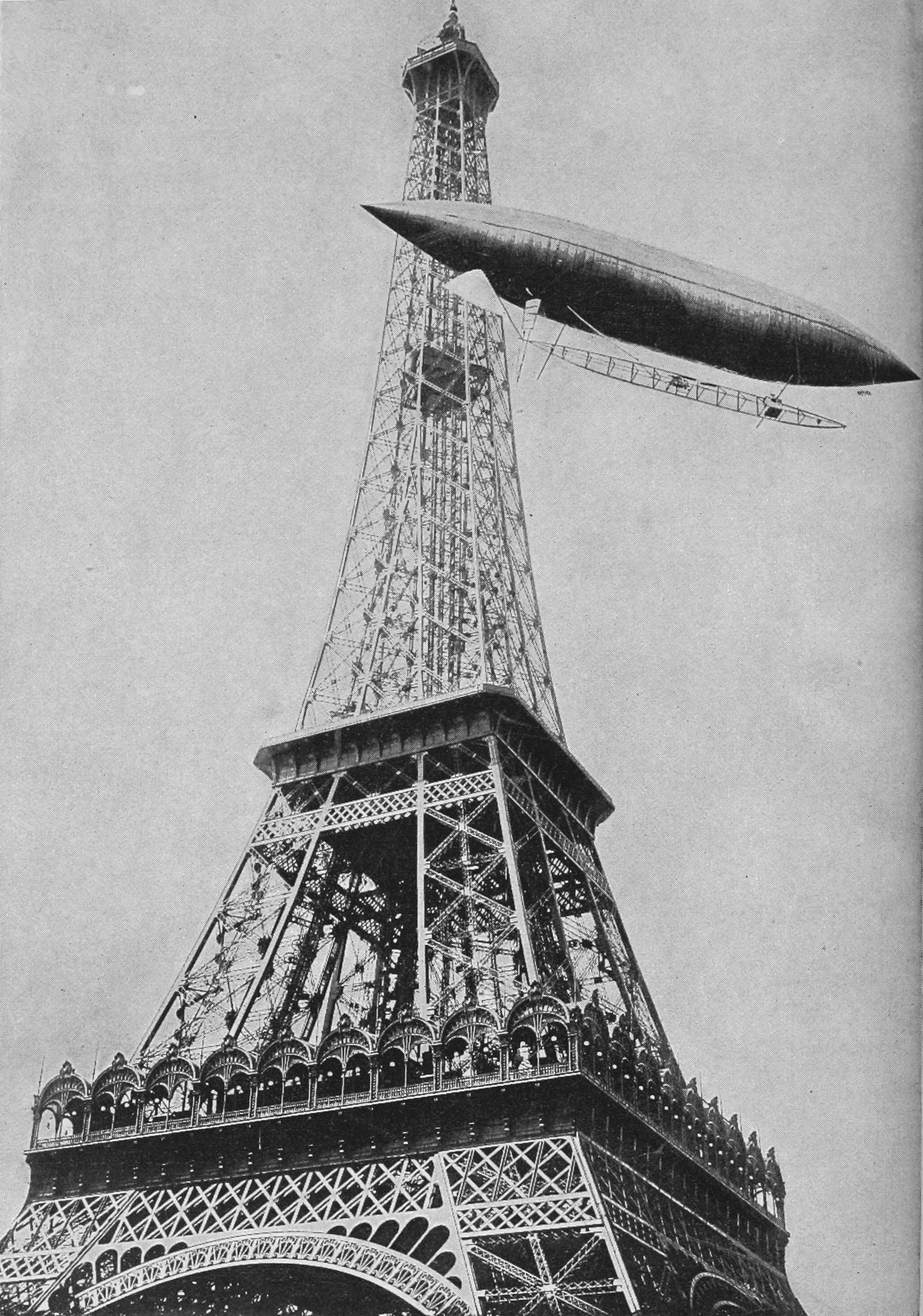
Santos-Dumont at the Eiffel Tower.

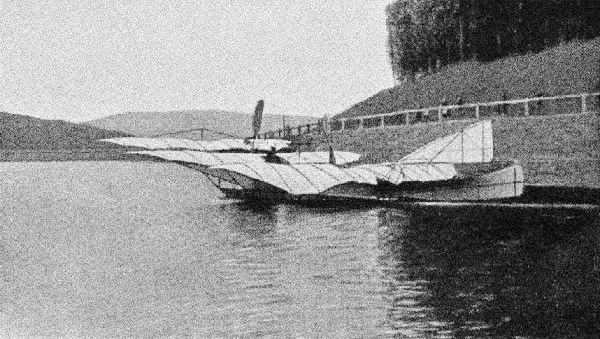
Kress' triplane.

- At the start of the 20th century, French Navy uses shipboard balloons and man-lifting kites. They are a major user of them.
- The French Navy torpedo boat tender Foudre operates a spherical balloon experimentally during naval maneuvers in the Mediterranean Sea.

=== January – December ===
- 10 January – German meteorologist and aerologist Arthur Berson and artillery officer Alfred Hildebrandt travel from Berlin, Germany, to Markaryd, Sweden, in a balloon, becoming the first people to cross the Baltic Sea by air.
- 11 July – The Wright brothers arrive for their second season at Kitty Hawk, North Carolina, during which they will test their 1901 glider.
- 27 July – Wilbur Wright makes 17 flights in the Wright 1901 glider on the first day of the glider's flight trials at Kitty Hawk.
- 31 July – In a 7½-hour flight from Berlin-Tempelhof to Briesen, Germany, German meteorologists Arthur Berson and Reinhard Süring climb to 10,800 meters (35,433 feet) in the free balloon Preussen, setting a world altitude record for human flight which will stand until 27 May 1931.
- 8 August – Wilbur Wright achieves a flight of 389 feet (118.5 m) at Kitty Hawk, North Carolina, in the Wright 1901 glider.
- 3 October – Wilhelm Kress trials his Drachenflieger twin-hulled tandem triplane seaplane, the first powered marine aircraft, in Austria-Hungary. It begins to become airborne when Kress slows and tries to turn to avoid an obstruction, capsizing the aircraft.
- 19 October – Brazilian Alberto Santos-Dumont collects the FF100,000 (US$50,000) Deutsch de la Meurthe prize by flying his dirigible Number 6 from the Aero Club at Saint-Cloud, Paris, around the Eiffel Tower, and back in only 29 minutes 30 seconds despite a stiff headwind on the return leg.
- 29 October – The Aero Club of the United Kingdom, predecessor of the Royal Aero Club, is established.
- 22 November – The Wright brothers begin wind tunnel experiments at Dayton, Ohio, to optimise the wing design of what will become their 1902 glider. During their experiments, which last into December, they will in essence develop the modern understanding of aerodynamics.

== Births ==
- 19 October – Maxine (Blossom) Miles, née Forbes-Robertson, English aviation engineer (d. 1984)
