= 1903 in aviation =

This is a list of aviation-related events from 1903:

== Events ==
=== January–December ===
- 1 January – Konstantin Tsiolkovsky deduces the Basic Rocket Equation in his article Explorations of outer space with the help of reaction apparatuses.
- 12 February - The world's first successful heavier-than-air aircraft engine, which will power the Wright brothers' first airplane in December 1903, runs for the first time in Dayton, Ohio.
- 16 February – Traian Vuia presents to the Académie des Sciences of Paris the possibility of flying with a heavier-than-air mechanical machine and his procedure for taking off, but is rejected for being a utopia, adding the comments: The problem of flight with a machine which weighs more than air can not be solved and it is only a dream.
- 23 March – The Wright brothers file an application for a patent for an airplane based on the design of their Glider No. 3.
- 31 March – Richard Pearse is reputed to have made a powered flight in a heavier-than-air craft, a monoplane of his own construction, that crash lands on a hedge. This date is computed from evidence of eyewitnesses as the flight was not well documented at the time. The flight is claimed to have been around 150 feet (45 m) on his farm at Upper Waitohi, near Timaru in south Canterbury, New Zealand.
- April 24 – Charles Frederick Page files an application for a patent for his airship, the first to be granted a patent in the United States.
- 11 May – Richard Pearse is claimed to have made a flight of around 1,000 yards (900 m), landing in the semi-dry bed of the Ōpihi River.
- 27 June – 19-year-old American socialite Aida de Acosta becomes the first woman to fly a powered aircraft solo when she pilots Santos-Dumont's motorized dirigible, “No. 9”, from Paris to Château de Bagatelle in France.
- 18 August – Karl Jatho makes a flight with his motored aircraft in front of four people. His craft flies up to 200 feet (60 m) a few feet above the ground.
- 7 October – Samuel Langley conducts the first tests of his full-sized man-carrying version of his earlier model aerodromes. The pilot, Charles Manly, nearly drowns when the machine slides off its launch apparatus atop a houseboat and falls into the Potomac River.
- 12 November – The Lebaudy brothers make a controlled dirigible flight of 54 km (34 mi) from Moisson to Paris, France.
- 19 November – Léon Y. K. Levavasseur demonstrates his Antoinette engine, designed as a lightweight powerplant specifically for aircraft.
- 8 December – Second attempt by Charles Manly to fly Langley's repaired full-sized aerodrome. As with the October 7 attempt the machine fails to fly, tripping on its launch gear and somersaulting into the Potomac River, nearly killing Manly. A surviving photograph captures the machine upended on its side as it falls off the houseboat. Langley himself was absent at this attempt but the machine's failure to fly ended his government (i.e. U.S. Army) funded attempts at building a successful full sized man-carrying flying machine.
- 17 December – The Wright Brothers make four flights in their Flyer at Kitty Hawk, North Carolina following years of research and development. Orville Wright takes off first and flies 120 ft (37 m) in 12 seconds. This is frequently considered the first controlled, powered heavier-than-air flight and is the first such flight photographed. On the fourth effort, Wilbur flies 852 ft (260 m) in 59 seconds.

== Births ==
- 9 January – Melitta Schenk Gräfin von Stauffenberg, German test pilot (shot down 1945)
