= Wright Glider =

Gliders built by the Wright brothers

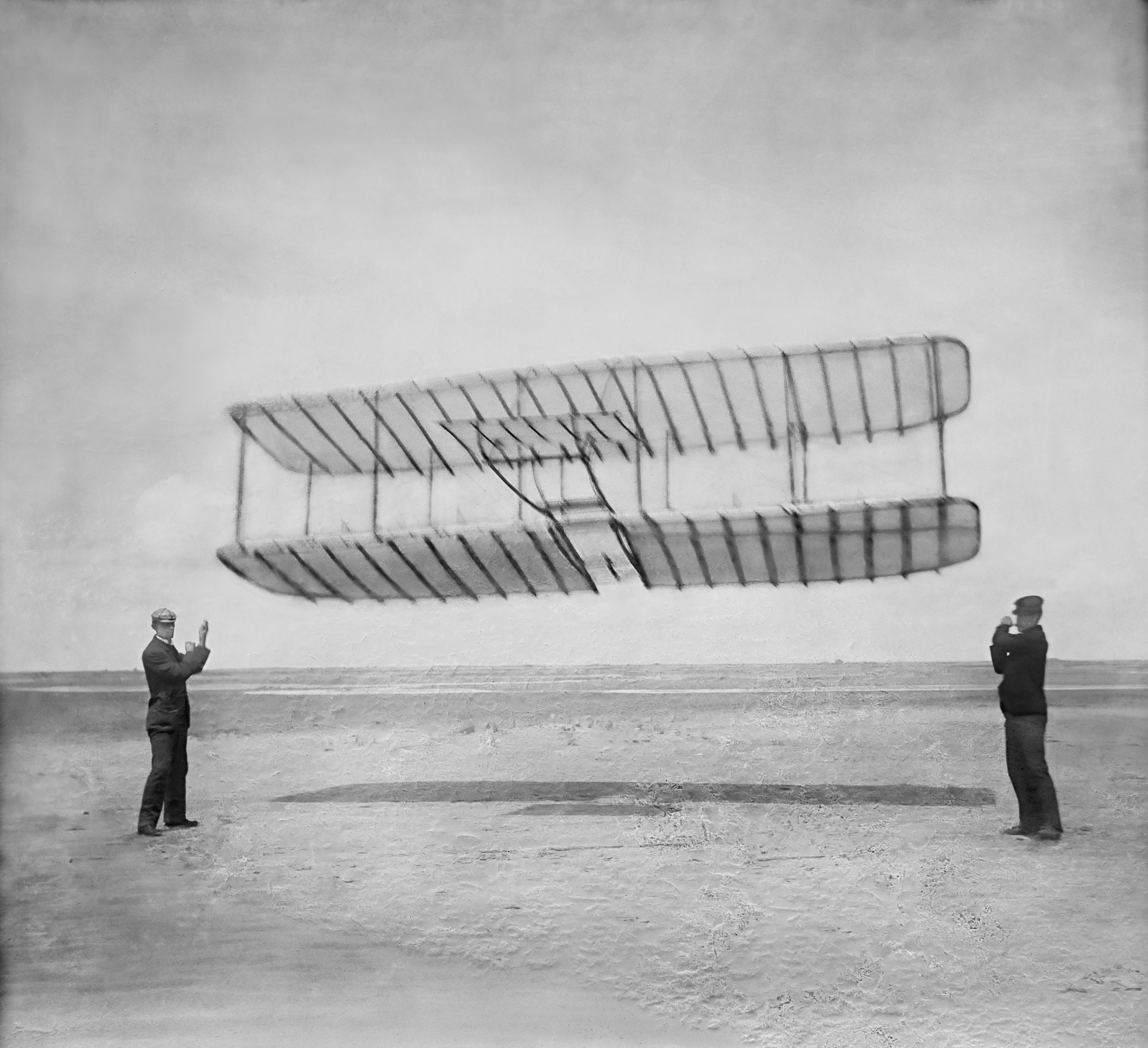
- Wilbur (left) and Orville flying their 1901 glider as a kite

General information
- Type: Experimental glider
- National origin: United States
- Designer: Orville and Wilbur Wright
- Number built: 1 kite, 4 gliders

History
- Developed into: Wright Flyer

The Wright brothers designed, built and flew a series of three manned gliders in 1900–1902 as they worked towards achieving powered flight. They also made preliminary tests with a kite in 1899. In 1911 Orville conducted tests with a much more sophisticated glider. Neither the kite nor any of the gliders were preserved, but replicas of all have been built.

== 1899 kite ==
The 1899 kite, which Wilbur flew near his home in Dayton, Ohio had a wingspan of only 5 feet (1.5 m). This pine wood and shellacked craft, although too small to carry a pilot, tested the concept of wing-warping for roll control that would prove essential to the brothers' solving the problem of controlled flight. The Wrights burned the craft along with other trash in 1905.

== 1900 glider ==
The 1900 Wright Glider was the brothers' first to be capable of carrying a human. Its overall structure was based on Octave Chanute's two-surface glider of 1896. Its wing airfoil was derived from Otto Lilienthal's published tables of aerodynamic lift. The glider was designed with wing-warping capability for full-size testing of the concept first tried on the 1899 Wright Kite.

On 23 September 1900, Wilbur wrote from Kitty Hawk, "My idea is merely to experiment and practice with a view to solving the problem of equilibrium. When once a machine is under proper control under all conditions, the motor problem will be quickly solved. I am constructing my machine to sustain about five times my weight...trussed like a bridge." Weighing 52 pounds (24 kg), the glider had a wingspan of 17.5 feet (5.3 m), a wing area of 155 square feet (14.4 m^{2}), while the wings were curved with a ratio of 1-in-22. In 1924, Orville wrote, "...we retained the elevator in front for many years because it absolutely prevented a nose dive such as that in which Lilienthal and many others since have met their deaths." Harry B. Combs noted, "...because the elevator was forward instead of behind, the aircraft, when it stalled, instead of spinning out and killing them the way a conventional aircraft would have done, simply parachuted to the ground in a flat position. The forward elevator also served as a visual indicator of the airplane's attitude in flight." The flyer would operate the craft from a prone position on the bottom wing, so as to reduce wind resistance.

The glider was first flown as an unmanned kite on October 5, 1900 near Kitty Hawk, North Carolina. Next, Wilbur rode as pilot while men on the ground held tether ropes attached to the airborne craft. Subsequently, Wilbur made about a dozen free flights on a single day, concluding the season's test efforts. The brothers abandoned the glider when they broke camp on 23 October, and it eventually disappeared in the region's severe storms. The fabric covering of the wing components was given to the wife of helper Bill Tate, whose family Wilbur first stayed with at Kitty Hawk in 1900. Mrs. Tate allegedly used the material to make dresses for her daughters.

Afterwards, Wilbur wrote, "longitudinal balancing and steering were effected by means of a horizontal rudder projecting in front of the planes. Lateral balancing and right and left steering were obtained by increasing the inclination of the wings at one end and decreasing their inclination at the other." The brothers had demonstrated two thirds of the eventual three-dimension control system (the glider did not possess a vertical rudder).

== 1901 glider ==
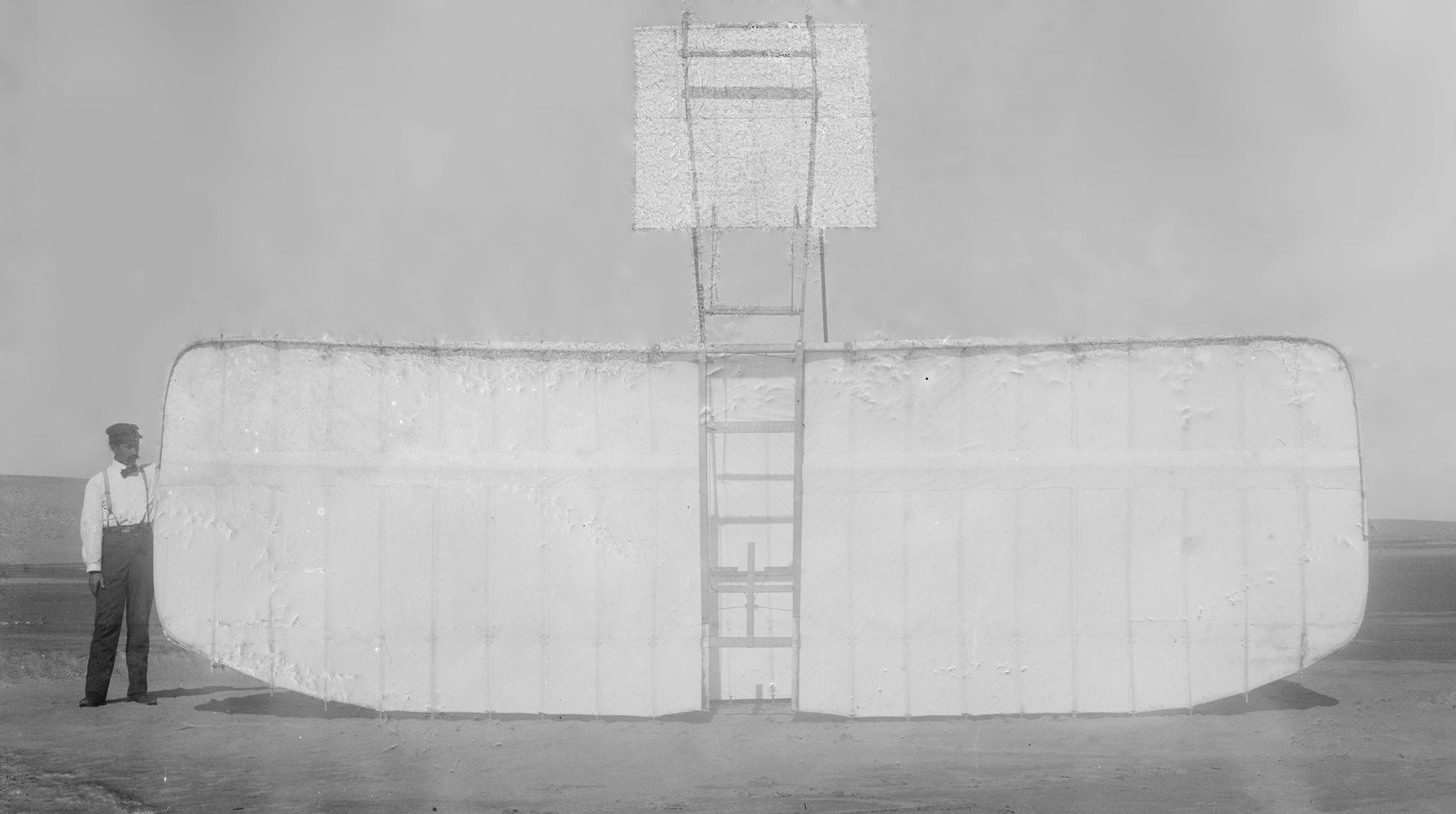
Orville with the 1901 glider, its nose pointing skyward

The 1901 Wright Glider was the second of the brothers' experimental gliders. They tested it over the Kill Devil Hills, four miles south of Kitty Hawk. The glider was similar to the 1900 version, but had larger wings. It first flew on July 27, 1901, and was retired on August 17. During this time it made between 50 and 100 free flights, in addition to tethered flights as a kite.

Operating from Big Kill Devil Hill once again, the new glider now had a 22 feet (6.7 m) wingspan, a chord of 7 feet (2.1 m), a wing area of 290 square feet (27 m^{2}), and weighed 98 pounds (44 kg). However, the camber was increased to a ratio of 1-in-12, with a blunt edge. This new wing design required Wilbur to apply full elevator deflection to get the glider flying, and Wilbur encountered stalls for the first time. However, the forward placement of the elevator allowed the glider the descend in a floating manner, rather than fall off into a spin. Wilbur noted that with light winds, "the center of pressure was in front of the center of gravity," while with increasing wind speed, the center of pressure moved aft, until with strong winds, "the center of pressure had reached a point even behind the center of gravity." This discovery led the brothers to reduce the wing depth of curvature. Wilbur noted that with the modification, "...we made glide after glide, sometimes following the ground closely, and sometimes sailing in the air." They also measured pressure at various angles of incidence, and noted the pressure was not at a right angle to the chord as expected, but inclined forward, overcoming structural resistance as well as generating lift. Yet the measured lift was only one third of what they had calculated it should be. That led them to doubt the Smeaton coefficient used to compute that lift, and to doubt the calculations made by Otto Lilienthal and Samuel Langley. The glider was also used to initiate a turn using wing-warping, which led to a surprise. Wilbur noted that the, "Upturned wing seems to fall behind, but at first rises." This would require a third means of controlling the glider, besides wing-warping and elevator deflection.

The wing ribs flexed under the weight of the pilot, distorting the airfoil shapes of the wings. The brothers fixed the trouble, but the wings still produced much less lift than expected, and wing-warping sometimes made the glider turn opposite the intended direction: it was the discovery and first description of adverse yaw. After testing concluded, the brothers stored the glider in their camp shed. The shed and glider were badly damaged later by windstorms. The wing uprights were salvaged for the 1902 Glider, but the rest was abandoned.

According to Combs, "When the Wrights first tested their 1900 glider on Big Kill Devil Hill, they had observed their calculations to be in error. Actually, the glider, to their bitter disappointment, produced about one half the computed lift. They had observed that the drag, or resistance of the total frame when it was carrying no weight and was therefore flown at a very flat angle of attack, was very much less than they had anticipated, perhaps more than half less." The discrepancy was due to the Wrights using a published value of 0.005 for the pressure coefficient of air (Smeaton coefficient). Convinced this coefficient value was in error, they derived a smaller value 0.0033 from their experiments, explaining why the encountered less lift, and drag, than originally computed, and expected.

== 1902 glider ==
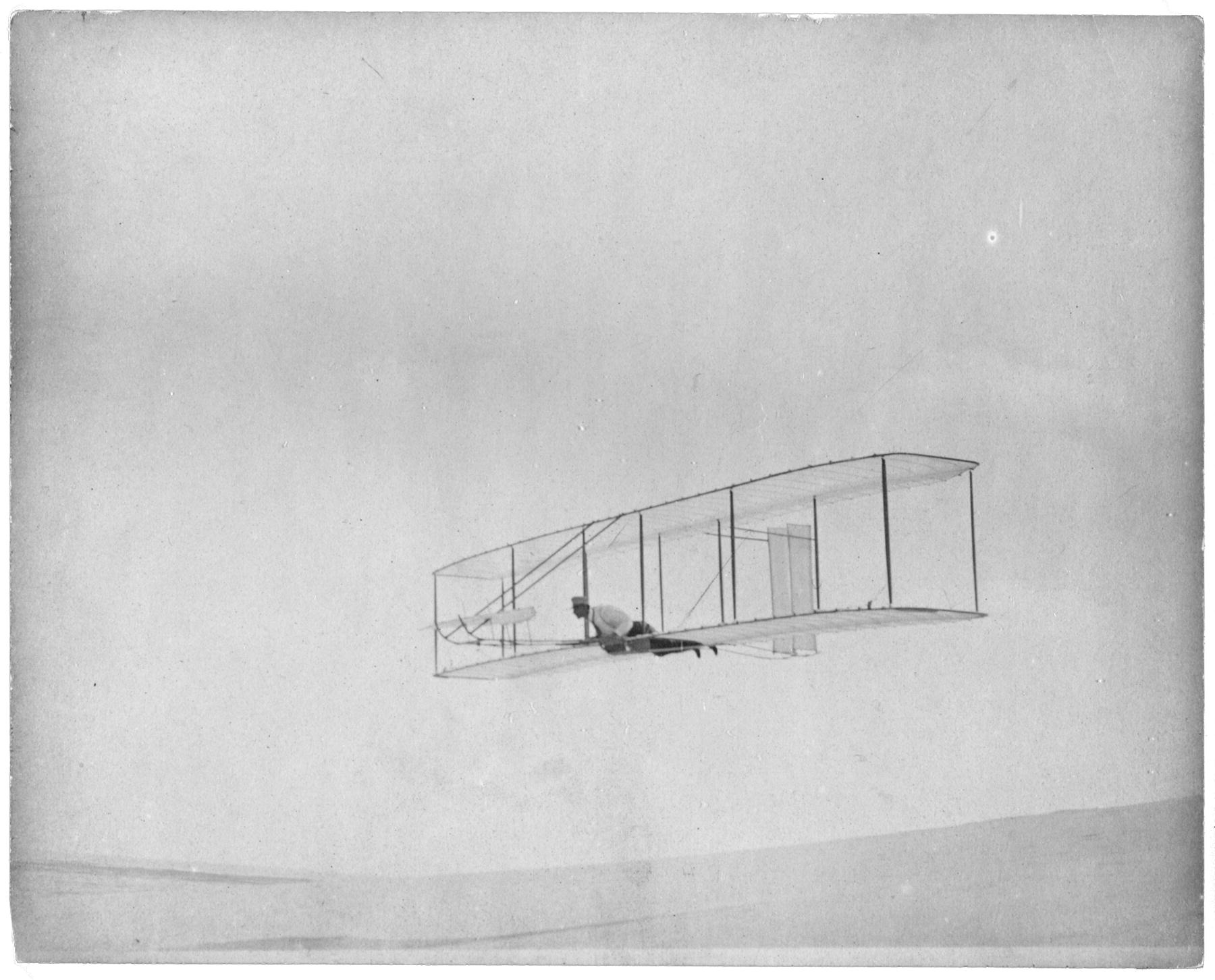
The 1902 Wright Glider (Wilbur piloting) on one of its early test flights before replacement of the fixed double rear vertical rudder with a single steerable rudder

The 1902 Wright Glider was the third free-flight glider built by the brothers. This was their first glider to incorporate yaw control by use of a rear rudder, and its design led directly to the powered 1903 Wright Flyer.

The brothers wind tunnel tested about 200 wing configurations, varying the aspect ratios, curves, cambers, dihedral, and anhedral in monoplane and multiwing combinations. Each airfoil was made from sheet metal, with welded leading edges. Wilbur described using a "wind straightener...a number of narrow vertical surfaces," so as to obtain "a current very nearly constant in direction. The instrument itself was mounted in a long square tube or trough having a glass cover..." Measuring 6 feet (1.8 m) long and 16 inches (41 cm) square, the wind was provided by a fan, connected by gears to a small internal combustion engine, all designed and built by the brothers. The resulting new glider, according to Wilbur, was "...32 feet (9.8 m) x 5 feet (1.5 m) spreading an area of 305 square feet (28.3 m^{2}) altogether. The curvature is about 1 in 25. The indications are that it will glide on an angle of about 7° to 7½° instead of 9½° to 10° as last year." Significantly, the peak of the camber was now about a third of the chord from the leading edge. The forward elevator was now smaller at 15 square feet (1.4 m^{2}) and in the shape of a small wing. The glider included a hip cradle to control the wing warping, and two, fixed, vertical rudders, each measuring about 1 foot (0.30 m) by 6 feet (1.8 m).

The brothers designed the 1902 glider during the winter of 1901/02. The wing design was based on data from extensive tests of miniature airfoils in their homemade wind tunnel. They built the components of the glider in Dayton and completed assembly at their Kill Devil Hills camp in September 1902. Flights took place between 19 September and 24 October. In order to cope with their 1901 discovery of adverse yaw in the glider, the Wrights tested a double fixed rear rudder, hoping to improve turning control, but several times the pilot was unable to stop turning and collided with the ground. "The addition of a fixed vertical vane in the rear increased the trouble, and made the machine absolutely dangerous." The brothers decided to remove one rudder, then make the remaining rudder steerable to achieve better control.

The new rudder was ready by 6 October, measured 5 feet (1.5 m) high, 14 inches (36 cm) wide, and had left or right movement of 30 degrees. Turns were coordinated by attaching the rudder to the same wires controlling wing warping. According to Combs, "In the last weeks of October at Kitty Hawk, they made more than a thousand gliding flights. They flew more than 600 feet on a number of occasions, and up to 26 seconds for a single flight. They flew in winds of more than 30 miles per hour." Most importantly, both brothers had flown, with Orville's first flight on 23 September. Wilbur noted, "We now hold all the records! The largest machine we handled in any kind of weather, made the longest distance glide (American), the longest time in the air, the smallest angle of descent, and the highest wind!!!"

In September 1903 they found their 1902 glider had survived the winter, though its building had been blown off its foundation 2 feet (0.61 m). They used the 1902 glider to practice flying, while preparing the powered Wright Flyer. They put up a new building measuring 44 feet (13 m) by 16 feet (4.9 m) by 9 feet (2.7 m), and built a stove to stay warm, as they made several gliding flights. On 3 October, they set a world glider endurance record of 43 seconds, then in November, they flew a new record of 1 minute and 12 seconds.

One of their photographs shows they installed a second vertical fin as part of the steerable rear rudder, matching the original design and also that of the powered Flyer's twin rear rudder. The glider was last flown in November 1903. After their successful powered flights, they put the glider back in storage at camp before returning home for Christmas. When they next visited Kitty Hawk in 1908 to test their improved Wright Flyer III, Outer Banks weather had taken its toll: the storage shed and glider inside were wrecked. Today a salvaged piece of wingtip from the 1902 Glider is preserved at the National Air and Space Museum a few feet from the 1903 Wright Flyer.

=== Specifications ===
Source: 1902 Wright Glider - National Air and Space Museum

General characteristics

- Crew: 1
- Length: 16 ft 1 in (4.9 m)
- Wingspan: 32 ft 1 in (9.8 m)
- Height: 8 ft 0 in (2.4 m)
- Wing area: 305 sq ft (28.3 m^{2})
- Empty weight: 117 lb (53 kg)

== 1911 glider ==
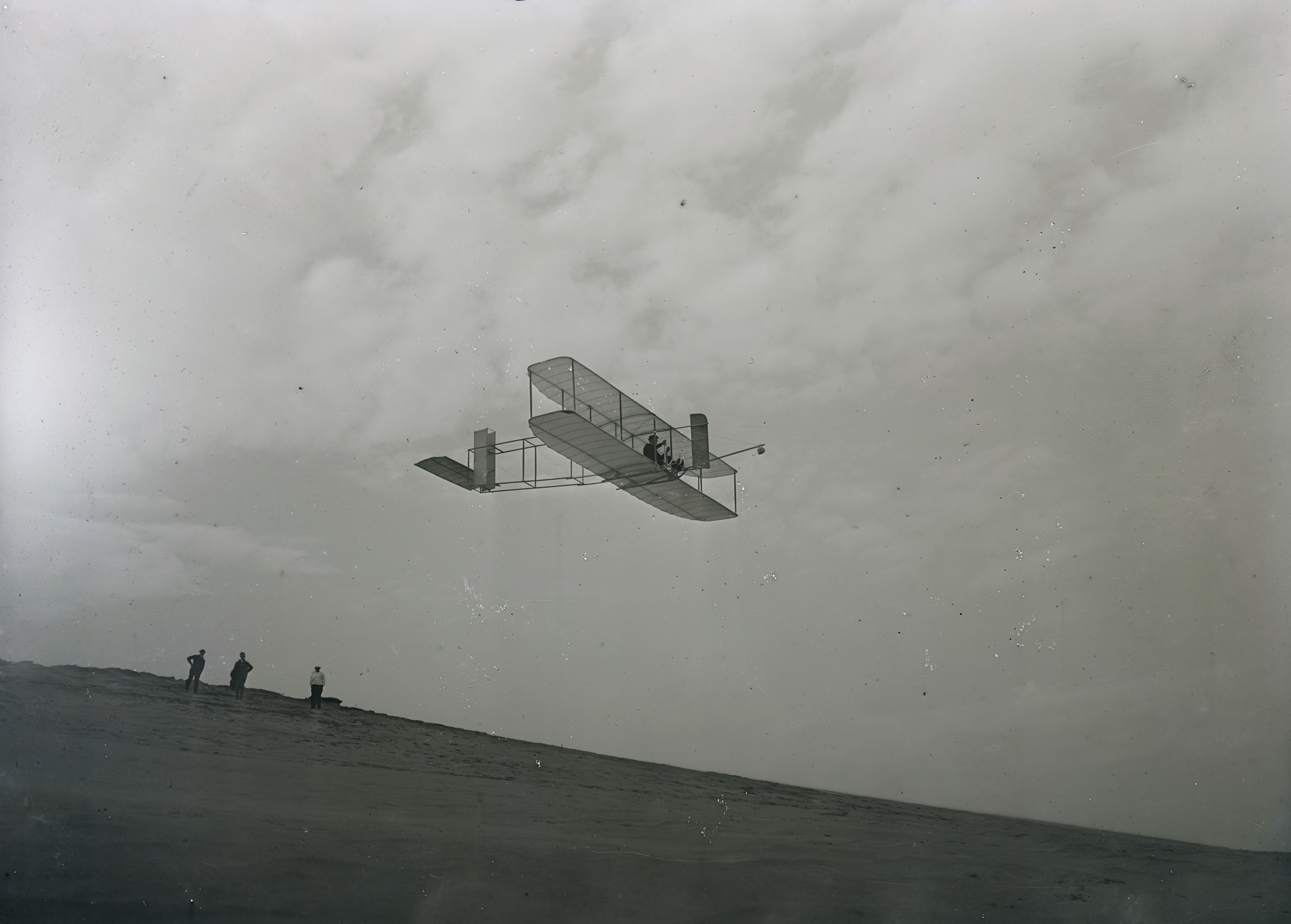
The 1911 glider over the Kill Devil Hills. Library of Congress Wright Collection.

In 1911 Orville Wright returned to the Kill Devil Hills with a new glider, accompanied by his English friend Alec Ogilvie. Orville intended to test an automatic control system on the glider, but did not because of the presence of reporters (he eventually perfected the system in a powered airplane in 1913). The glider had what was then becoming a conventional tailplane, rather than the front-mounted elevator or canard. The pilot also was seated with hand controls, rather than lying prone in a cradle, as with the original gliders. On October 24 Orville soared in the glider above Kill Devil Hill in a 40 miles per hour (64 km/h) wind for 9 minutes 45 seconds, far exceeding the brothers' previous gliding durations. The record stood for ten years until broken in Germany in 1921 by Wolfgang Klemperer.

General characteristics

- Crew: 1
- Length: 21 ft 6 in (6.5 m)
- Wingspan: 32 ft 0 in (9.8 m)
- Height: 9 ft 10 in (3 m)
- Wing area: 300 sq ft (28 m^{2})
- Empty weight: 170 lb (77 kg)

== Replicas ==
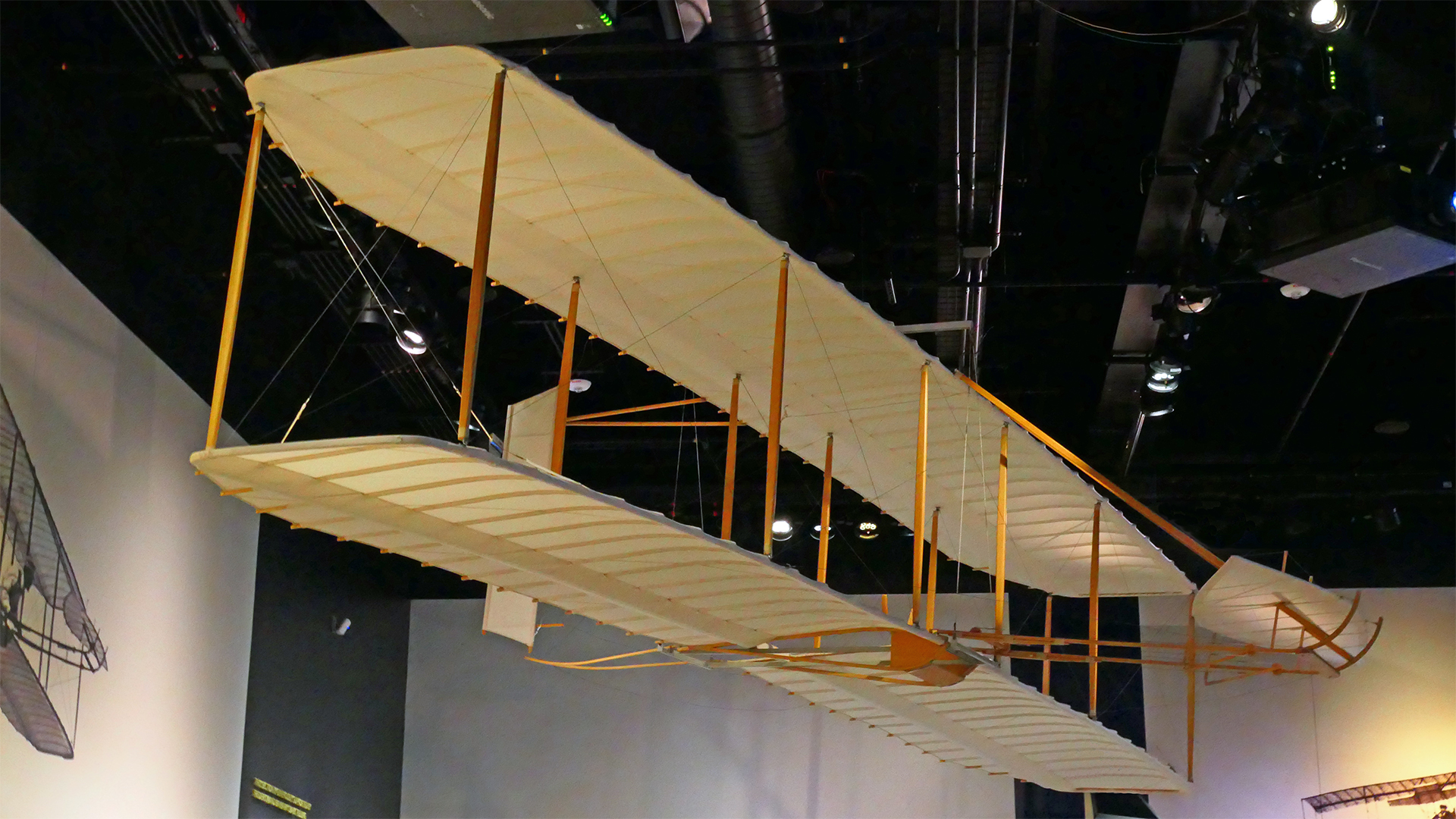
Replica of 1902 Wright Glider on display at the Smithsonian National Air and Space Museum. A fragment of wing ribbing from the original 1902 glider is also on display in the exhibit.

A number of replicas of the gliders exist. Wright brothers historian Rick Young of Richmond, Virginia has built 9 accurate working replicas of all of the Wright gliders and the 1903 Flyer. Young's 1902 gliders have appeared in numerous films and television documentaries, including a 1986 IMAX film On the Wing. One of his 1902 replicas is on display at the Smithsonian National Air and Space Museum's Wright Brothers gallery. The Virginia Aviation Museum at Richmond International Airport is home to the Wright 1899 Kite, the 1900, 1901 and 1902 gliders and the 1903 Flyer, all built by Young. In 2011, Young researched and built a Wright 1911 glider replica that was displayed during the Soaring 100 event at the Wright Brothers National Monument to commemorate the 100th anniversary of Orville Wright's record-setting glide.

A replica of the 1902 glider is on display at the Dayton Aviation Heritage National Historic Park in Dayton Ohio.

Another replica of the 1902 glider is also on display at the U.S. National Soaring Museum in Elmira, New York.

A full-scale replica of the 1902 glider was constructed and is on display at the San Diego Air & Space Museum in San Diego, California.

Another replica, a half-scale model, is on display at the Wings Over the Rockies Air and Space Museum in Denver, Colorado.

A team led by Nick Engler of the Wright Brothers Aeroplane Company has also built replicas of all three gliders.

A replica of the 1911 glider was built by Ernest Schweizer for the 75th anniversary of Orville's soaring flight. It has hung in the National Soaring Museum in Elmira, New York since 1986.

Some replicas are flown in modern times.
