= 1987 in aviation =

- Years in aviation: 1984 1985 1986 1987 1988 1989 1990
- Centuries: 19th century · 20th century · 21st century
- Decades: 1950s 1960s 1970s 1980s 1990s 2000s 2010s
- Years: 1984 1985 1986 1987 1988 1989 1990

This is a list of aviation-related events from 1987.

== Events ==
- Lauda Air begins scheduled service.

=== January ===
- During January and February, the United States Navy conducts proof-of-concept tests of Pioneer (later RQ-2 Pioneer) unmanned aerial vehicles aboard the battleship USS Iowa (BB-61) in the Caribbean Sea to see if they can spot effectively for naval gunfire. Although four of the five Pioneers are lost during the tests, they demonstrate their ability to detect targets for Iowa's 16-inch (406-mm) guns.
- January 1 – United States Coast Guard HH-65 Dolphin and United States Navy H-3 Sea King helicopters help rescue people trapped inside the Dupont Plaza hotel in Puerto Rico after a fire breaks out there late on December 31, 1986.
- January 3 – Varig Flight 797, a Boeing 707-379C, develops engine trouble after departing Abidjan, Ivory Coast. It crashes while attempting to return to the airport, killing 50 of the 51 people on board.
- January 7 – French Air Force jets attack the Libyan Air Force base in Ouadi Doum to avenge a raid by Libya against the French military three days before.
- January 9 – In the Iran–Iraq War, an Iranian Hawk surface-to-air missile shoots down an Iraqi Air Force MiG-25 (NATO reporting name "Foxbat").
- January 14 – Iranian Hawk missiles shoot down two Iraqi Air Force Tupolev Tu-22 (NATO reporting name "Badger") bombers.
- January 15
  - Iraq claims to have shot down an Islamic Republic of Iran Air Force F-14 Tomcat in air-to-air combat.
  - Iraq claims its aircraft have flown over 500 combat missions in support of Iraqi ground forces since January 14.
  - Since January 1, Iraq has conducted airstrikes against five ships in the Persian Gulf and 30 economic and urban targets in Iran, while Iran has carried three airstrikes, all against economic and urban targets in Iraq.
- January 22 – Iran claims to have shot down 57 Iraqi aircraft since January 1, while Iraq admits to the loss of 15.
- January 28 – An Iranian Hawk missile shoots down an Iraqi MiG-23 (NATO reporting name "Flogger") flying at an altitude of 13,000 feet (4,000 meters) over the front lines at Basra, Iraq.
- January 30 – Since January 15, Iraq has conducted airstrikes against two ships in the Persian Gulf and 18 economic and urban targets in Iran, while Iran has carried out 12 airstrikes, all against urban and economic targets in Iraq.
- January 31
  - During the month, Iraq has conducted over 200 long-range air and ballistic missile strikes against 35 Iranian cities, including Qom, Nahawand, Ramhormoz, Isfahan, and Dezful. Iran claims that the raids have killed over 3,000 civilians in a single week, but later revises this claim to say that the raids killed over 1,800 Iranians and injured over 6,200. Iran claims to have shot down 69 Iraqi aircraft during the month, while Iraq admits to the loss of no more than 38.
  - During the month, Iran and Iraq have struck more targets in the Persian Gulf than in any other month of the Iran-Iraq War since it began in September 1980.

=== February ===
- During early and mid-February, the Iraqi Air Force conducts continual strikes against the 13 major cities in western Iran and against Tehran.
- During the month, a defecting Islamic Republic of Iran Air Force colonel says in Mujahideen-e-Khalq-sponsored press conferences that only one-third of Iran's 65 F-4 Phantom IIs, a third of its attack helicopters, 30 to 40 of its C-130 Hercules, six to ten of its F-14 Tomcats, and four of its tanker aircraft remain operational; that only one or two or its pre-Iran–Iraq War total of six P-3C Orion maritime patrol aircraft remain fully operational; that several C-130s had crashed due to poor maintenance; that two-thirds of Iran's 65 flyable fighter aircraft were not fully functional; that all of Iran's RF-4E Phantom II reconnaissance aircraft had been shot down or lost in accidents; that Iran had shot down 55 of its own aircraft due to radar and identification-friend-or-foe problems, including a Dassault Falcon jet transport shot down by a Hawk surface-to-air missile in early February; that Iran had too few technical experts to keep its remaining aircraft flying; and that 180 Iranian pilots had defected, many with their aircraft, and that Iranian pilots were briefed on their missions only an hour or so ahead of time so that they would not have time to plan defections.
- February 1 – People Express Airlines and New York Air cease operations, and People Express, Frontier Airlines (which had ceased operations in August 1986), New York Air, and several commuter airlines merge into Continental Airlines.
- February 9 – A single Islamic Republic of Iran Air Force plane drops bombs on Basra, Iraq.
- February 11 – British Airways is privatised.
- February 14 – Since January 1, Iraq has conducted 75 airstrikes against Iranian economic installations.
- February 15
  - Iraq claims to have lost three aircraft over Iranian cities since 14 February, at least of them to an Iranian surface-to-air missile.
  - Since February 1, Iraq has conducted airstrikes against four ships in the Persian Gulf and 27 economic and urban targets in Iran.
- February 18 – The latest phase of major Iraqi airstrikes against Iranian cities and Iranian ballistic missile strikes against Iraqi cities, which began on January 9, ends. Iran claims that Iraqi aircraft have struck 35 Iranian cities and towns, killing 3,000 Iranians and injuring 9,000.
- February 28 – Since February 16, Iraq has conducted airstrikes against five ships in the Persian Gulf and eight economic and urban targets in Iran

=== March ===
- Grumman delivers the last of 712 Grumman F-14 Tomcat fighters produced to the United States Navy. Production has included 557 F-14A (of which 18 later were converted into F-14Ds), 38 F-14A+ (later redesignated F-14B), and 37 F-14D aircraft for the U.S. Navy and 80 F-14As for the Imperial Iranian Air Force, of which 79 were delivered to Iran and one retained by the United States after the 1979 Iranian Revolution.
- March 5 – American race car driver Don Yenko is killed when the Cessna 210 Centurion he is piloting lands hard near Charleston, West Virginia, veers off the runway, hits a bank of dirt, falls into a ravine, and crashes. His three passengers also die.
- March 10 – The Pan Am Boeing 747-121 Clipper Ocean Pearl, operating as Flight 125 with 245 people on board, experiences pressurization problems during climbout from Heathrow Airport in England, and returns to the airport. An investigation finds that latching problems had allowed the forward cargo door to come ajar. A similar door problem will lead to a fatal accident aboard United Airlines Flight 811 in February 1989.
- March 21 – American entertainer Dean Paul "Dino" Martin, the son of singer and actor Dean Martin, is killed when the California Air National Guard F-4C Phantom II he is piloting enters a maximum takeoff climb, flies into clouds, and crashes into a wall of granite on Mount San Gorgonio in California's San Bernardino Mountains while flying inverted at a speed of 560 miles per hour (900 kilometres per hour)r). His weapon systems officer also dies.
- March 27 – Pacific Western Airlines purchases Canadian Pacific Air Lines, and the two airlines amalgamate to form Canadian Airlines.
- March 29 – The United States Navy disbands United States Naval Reserve Light Photographic Reconnaissance Squadron 206 (VFP-206), its last squadron equipped with specialized photographic reconnaissance aircraft and the last equipped with any version of the Vought F-8 Crusader.
- March 31 – Since March 1, Iraq has conducted airstrikes against eight ships in the Persian Gulf and four urban and economic targets in Iran. Iran has carried out one airstrike targeting Persian Gulf shipping but none against urban and economic targets in Iraq.

=== April ===
- After purchasing and merging with Canadian Pacific Airlines and Nordair, Pacific Western Airlines announces that the name of the new combined airline will be Canadian Airlines International.
- April 1
  - The Government of India′s Bureau of Civil Aviation Security, becomes an independent agency of the Ministry of Civil Aviation. Previously, it had been a department of the Directorate General of Civil Aviation.
  - Western Airlines ceases to exist as it merges with Delta Air Lines. Western had operated since April 1926.
- April 2 – A Royal Air Force Vickers VC10 sets a new record time between the United Kingdom and Australia, landing in Perth, Australia, after a flight of 16 hours 1 minute.
- April 4 – Garuda Indonesia Flight 035, a Douglas DC-9-32, strikes a pylon and crashes on approach to Medan-Polonia Airport in Medan on Sumatra in Indonesia. A fire following the crash kills 23 of the 45 people on board; all 22 survivors are injured.
- April 10 – Johan Åhling of Sweden introduces the "Mosquito", a foot-launched powered hang glider harness.
- April 11 – British charter airline Air 2000 begins operations with a leased Boeing 757-200.
- April 13 – The Iranian Karbala 9 offensive ends. Since Iran launched its Katbala 4 offensive on the night of December 23–24, 1986, the Iraqi Air Force has lost between 70 and 90 aircraft, and during March and April it was lost several aircraft per week.
- April 30 – Since April 1, Iraq has conducted five airstrikes against shipping in the Persian Gulf and seven urban and economic targets in Iran. Iran has carried out no airstrikes against Persian Gulf shipping or urban and economic targets in Iraq.

=== May ===
- May 4 – American Eagle Flight 5452, a CASA C-212 operated by Executive Airlines, crashes on landing at Eugenio María de Hostos Airport in Mayagüez, Puerto Rico, killing both pilots. The other four people on board, all passengers, survive with minor injuries.
- May 9 – The LOT Polish Airlines Ilyushin Il-62M Tadeusz Kościuszko, operating as LOT Flight 5055 bound for New York City, catches fire due to an engine failure soon after take-off from Okęcie Airport and crashes into the Kabaty Woods nature reserve on the outskirts of Warsaw, Poland, killing all 183 persons on board. It is the deadliest aviation disaster of 1987.
- May 17 – In the USS Stark incident, an Iraqi Air Force Dassault Mirage F1 jet hits the United States Navy guided-missile frigate USS Stark (FFG-31) with two Exocet antiship cruise missiles, badly damaging her and killing 37 and wounding 21 of her crew.
- May 29
  - To create an "imaginary bridge" between the Western world and the Communist Bloc and defuse tensions between the two, Mathias Rust, a 19-year-old West German pilot, makes an unauthorized flight from Helsinki-Malmi Airport in Helsinki, Finland, through supposedly impregnable Soviet air defenses and lands his rented Reims Cessna F172P adjacent to Red Square in Moscow in the Soviet Union. He is arrested. His flight results in the firing of many senior Soviet military personnel, including the Minister of Defense, Marshal of the Soviet Union Sergei Sokolov, and the Commander-in-Chief of the National Air Defense Forces, Chief Marshal Alexander Koldunov.
  - Pacific Southwest Airlines becomes a division of USAir.
- May 31 – Since May 1, Iraq has conducted six airstrikes against shipping in the Persian Gulf and five against urban and economic targets in Iran. Iran has carried out eight airstrikes against Persian Gulf shipping and two against urban and economic targets in Iraq.

=== June ===
- June 4 – In Operation Poomalai, five Indian Air Force Antonov An-32 (NATO reporting name "Cline") transport aircraft airdrop supplies by parachute into the city of Jaffna, Sri Lanka, to aid Tamil Tiger rebels who have been besieged there by Sri Lankan government forces during the Sri Lankan Civil War. Five Mirage 2000 fighters escort the An-32s, but the Indian aircraft meet no opposition.
- June 11 – An unidentified warplane attacks the Greek tanker Ethnic in the Persian Gulf near Kuwait.
- June 19–20 – The Iraqi Air Force strikes the tanker Tenacity in the Persian Gulf and the western jetty at Iran's Kharg Island.
- June 21 – Air France pilot Partick Fourticq and friend Henri Pescarolo once again enter the record books, completing an around-the-world flight aboard a Lockheed Model 18 Lodestar in 88 hours 19 minutes.
- June 27 – Philippine Airlines Flight 206, a Hawker Siddeley HS 748, crashes into Mount Ugu near Itogon, Benguet, in the Philippines, killing all 50 people on board. It is the second-worst aviation accident in Philippine history at the time.
- June 30 – Since June 1, Iraq and Iran each has conducted a single airstrike against shipping in the Persian Gulf. Iraq has conducted a single airstrike against urban and economic targets in Iran, while Iran has carried out none against urban and economic targets in Iraq.

=== July ===
- July 3 – Richard Branson and Per Lindstrand become the first people to complete a transatlantic flight in a hot-air balloon, aboard the balloon Virgin Atlantic Flyer.
- July 24
  - The Government of Australia′s Department of Aviation is absorbed by the new Department of Transport & Communications, which is created on the same date.
  - Operation Ernest Will – the American military protection of Kuwaiti-owned tankers from Iranian attacks in the Persian Gulf – begins, covered by United States Navy forces including F-14 Tomcat, F/A-18 Hornet, A-6 Intruder, and EA-6B Prowler aircraft from the aircraft carrier USS Constellation (CV-64) in the Indian Ocean. The operation will continue for 14 months.
- July 28 – Iraq shoots down a Syrian Air Force fighter that mistakenly flies over Iraqi territory.
- July 31 – Since July 1, Iraq has conducted five airstrikes against shipping in the Persian Gulf and six against urban and economic targets in Iran. Iran has carried out four airstrikes against Persian Gulf shipping, but none against urban and economic targets in Iraq.

=== August ===
- During the month, the United States Navy deploys eight RH-53D Sea Stallion minesweeping helicopters to the Persian Gulf to assist in the clearing of Iraqi and Iranian naval mines.
- August 8 – A United States Air Force E-3 Sentry airborne early warning and control aircraft vectors two U.S. Navy F-14A Tomcat fighters from the aircraft carrier USS Constellation (CV-64) to an encounter with an Islamic Republic of Iran Air Force F-4 Phantom II fighter approaching a U.S. P-3C Orion maritime patrol aircraft in a threatening manner and refusing to be warned off. One F-14A fires two AIM-7F Sparrow air-to-air missiles at the F-4, scoring no hits, and the F-4 breaks off and returns to Iran. The entire encounter takes place beyond visual range via radar.
- August 9 – US airline TranStar Airlines (formerly known as Muse Air), a subsidiary of SouthWest Airlines operating out of Dallas Love Field, ceases operation and is shut down.
- August 10 – The Iraqi Air Force bombs Iranian oil facilities for the first time in 25 days, claiming to fly 110 sorties, attacking the oil refinery at Tabriz and oil sites at Biki Hakima, Marun-e Jayezan, Karanj, and Gachsaran.
- August 15 – Since August 1, Iraq has conducted two airstrikes against urban and economic targets in Iran. Iran has carried out none against urban and economic targets in Iraq.
- August 16 – A McDonnell Douglas MD-82 of Northwest Airlines operating as Flight 255 crashes on takeoff from Detroit Metropolitan Wayne County Airport in Romulus, Michigan. The crash kills all but one of the 157 people on the plane, as well as two on the ground; only a seriously injured four-year-old girl survives. Among the dead is National Basketball Association player Nick Vanos. It remains the deadliest aviation accident with a sole survivor in American history.
- August 17 – In the Philippines, Manila International Airport is renamed Ninoy Aquino International Airport.
- August 30
  - Iraq resumes airstrikes in the Persian Gulf after a 45-day hiatus. Iraqi Air Force aircraft strike Kharg Island, Sirri Island, and Lavan Island, setting fire to at least one storage tanker.
  - The Government of Israel cancels the IAI Lavi programme.
- August 31
  - Thai Airways Flight 365, a Boeing 737-2P5, crashes into the Andaman Sea while on approach to Ko Phuket in Phuket Province, Thailand, killing all 83 people on board.
  - Since August 1, Iraq has conducted no airstrikes against shipping in the Persian Gulf, while Iran has carried out three. Since 16 August, however, the pace of air attacks on urban and economic targets has increased sharply, with Iraq striking 13 such targets in Iran and Iran hitting seven in Iraq.

=== September ===
- September 1 – In three straight days of air raids beginning on August 30, the Iraqi Air Force has hit Iranian tankers, oil facilities in the Persian Gulf, oil facilities ashore in Iran, and factories.
- September 13 – A fully armed Soviet Air Forces Sukhoi Su-27 (NATO reporting name "Flanker") intercepts a Royal Norwegian Air Force Lockheed P-3 Orion maritime patrol aircraft flying over the Barents Sea and makes three close passes, colliding with P-3 on the third pass. The Su-27 then disengages, and both aircraft return to base safely.
- September 15
  - The pace of Iraqi and Iranian airstrikes against shipping in the Persian Gulf and urban and economic targets on each other's territory has increased sharply during the first half of September. Since September 1, Iraq has conducted 22 airstrikes against Persian Gulf shipping and 35 against urban and economic targets in Iran, while Iran has conducted 10 airstrikes against shipping and eight against urban and economic targets in Iraq.
  - A Eurocopter AS565 Panther sets new time-to-altitude records for helicopters in its class.
- September 16 – Iraq begins a new series of airstrikes against Iranian ships and oil facilities. Iran responds, and by September 19 both sides are striking inland oil targets.
- September 21 – Two United States Army OH-6A Cayuse light attack helicopters equipped with night vision devices and operating from the United States Navy guided-missile frigate USS Jarrett (FFG-33) as part of Operation Prime Chance observe the Iranian naval landing craft Iran Ajr laying naval mines at night in the Persian Gulf. The helicopters fire on Iran Ajr, disabling her and killing three to five (sources differ) members of her crew. U.S. Navy SEALs soon board and seize Iran Ajr, which U.S. forces scuttle on 26 September.
- September 30 – Since September 16, Iraq has conducted 19 airstrikes against shipping in the Persian Gulf and 19 against urban and economic targets in Iraq. Iran has carried out seven airstrikes against Persian Gulf shipping and three against urban and economic targets in Iraq.

=== October ===
- October 3 – After United States Air Force E-3A Sentry airborne early warning and control aircraft detect 48 to 60 Iranian speed boats moving from Kharg Island across the Persian Gulf toward the Khafji oil field in Kuwait, Royal Saudi Air Force F-15 Eagle and Tornado aircraft join Royal Saudi Navy and United States Navy warships in moving toward them. After detecting the movement of the Saudi and American forces, the Iranian boats turn away and return to Iran.
- October 5 – The Iraqi Air Force begins a new series of long-range strikes targeting tankers loading at Iran's Larak Island, scoring major hits in the vicinity of Larak Island for the first time. The attack is the 21st Iraqi airstrike against Persian Gulf shipping since late August. Although it fails to sink or set afire any ships, it does hit four tankers, including Seawise Giant, the world's largest ship.
- October 8
  - A force of American helicopters including three United States Army MH-6 Little Bird night surveillance/attack helicopters attacks an Iranian naval force of a corvette and three speedboats approaching the barge Hercules, employed as a floating American base near Farsi Island in the Persian Gulf. The helicopters sink one Boghammer speedboat and damage two Boston Whaler-type boats, killing or mortally wounding eight Iranian crewmen, and United States Navy SEALs take six other Iranian crewmen prisoner.
  - The Iraqi Air Force hits a Greek-owned merchant ship, killing one crewman. The strike brings the total number of Iraqi Air Force antishipping raids since October 1 to 12, and the number of ships Iraq and Iran have hit in the Persian Gulf since October 1 to nine, with seven crewmen killed and four injured in the attacks. The Iraqi Air Force has flown some 50 sorties a day against Persian Gulf shipping since October 5 and has lost one Mirage F-1 since October 1.
- October 12 – Since January 1, Iraq has made 60 air attacks against shipping in the Persian Gulf, three using bombs and the remainder using air-to-surface missiles, while Iran has conducted no air attacks against Persian Gulf shipping. The total of Iraqi air attacks against Persian Gulf shipping since 1984 has reached 185 – five using bombs, four using rockets, and 176 using air-to-surface missiles, while Iran's total since 1984 stands at 37.
- October 15
  - Since October 1, Iraq has conducted 15 airstrikes against shipping in the Persian Gulf and 12 against urban and economic targets in Iran. Iran has carried out eight airstrikes against Persian Gulf shipping and six against urban and economic targets in Iraq.
  - Aero Trasporti Italiani Flight 460, an ATR-42-312, crashed 15 minutes after takeoff from Milan, Italy, killing all 37 occupants on board.
- October 19 – In retaliation for a series of Iranian Silkworm missile strikes against Kuwait, a U.S. Navy force attacks Iran's Rustam oil platform in the Persian Gulf. Three U.S. Navy aircraft – two F-14 Tomcats and an E-2C Hawkeye – cover the operation. The only Iranian response is to launch a single Islamic Republic of Iran Air Force F-4 Phantom II, which turns away as soon as it detects the size of the American force.
- October 20 – Attempting to make an emergency landing at Indianapolis International Airport in Indianapolis, Indiana, a U.S. Air Force A-7D-4-CV Corsair II crashes into the nearby Airport Ramada Inn. The pilot survives, but nine people in the hotel die.
- October 23 – The last F-104 Starfighter is phased out of German Air Force service.
- October 24
  - Iran claims that three Islamic Republic of Iran Air Force fighter aircraft have flown within 10 miles (16 km) of a U.S. Navy warship in the Persian Gulf despite warnings not to do so.
  - A Pan American World Airways office in Kuwait is damaged by a terrorist bomb.
- October 28 – Iraq claims hits on three Iranian tankers in an airstrike in the Persian Gulf. In fact, no ships are damaged.
- October 31
  - British Airways accepts the airline's first women pilots.
  - In late October, Iraqi Air Force aircraft strike the Agha Jari oil field in southwestern Iran, an Iranian oil refinery in Shiraz, and tankers shuttling oil cargoes in the Persian Gulf for Iran, hitting a supertanker in use as a storage hulk. Since October 16, Iraq has conducted nine airstrikes against shipping in the Persian Gulf and four against urban and economic targets in Iran. Iran has carried out one airstrike against Persian Gulf shipping and four against urban and economic targets in Iraq.

=== November ===
- The British Department for Transport′s Accidents Investigation Branch is renamed the Air Accidents Investigation Branch.
- November 4 – Iraqi Air Force aircraft hit the National Iranian Tanker Company's tanker Taftan as she loads oil at Kharg Island. It is the first successful Iraqi antishipping strike since October 21.
- November 14
  - Iraq claims to have conducted air raids against Iranian oil fields at Abed al-Khan, Marun-e Jayezan, and Kaj Saran.
  - The Canadian airline Air Transat begins operations.
- November 15
  - Continental Airlines Flight 1713, a McDonnell Douglas DC-9-14 with 82 people on board, crashes while taking off from Stapleton International Airport in Denver, Colorado, during a snowstorm. Twenty-eight people lose their lives and all 54 survivors are injured, 28 of them seriously.
  - Iraq claims that its air force has hit 15 ships in the Persian Gulf since November 9, but it has damaged only three ships. Since November 1, Iraq has conducted 18 air strikes against shipping in the Persian Gulf and 14 against urban and economic targets in Iran. Iran has carried out three air strikes against Persian Gulf shipping and eight against urban and economic targets in Iraq.
- November 17 – Iraqi Air Force aircraft conduct a major raid against the Iranian nuclear reactor under construction at Bushehr, killing one West German technician and injuring several other West Germans working on the reactor.
- November 19 – Iraqi Air Force aircraft carry out another major raid against the Iranian nuclear reactor at Bushehr.
- November 20 – Iraq claims that it has hit 21 ships in air attacks in the Persian Gulf since November 8, but in fact has damaged only four.
- November 22 – Iran claims to have fired on four American helicopters operating over the Persian Gulf, although no such incident appears to have occurred.
- November 23 – Ryan Air Service Flight 103, a Beechcraft 1900C registered as N401RA, crashes on landing at Homer Airport, Alaska, United States. Out of the 21 occupants onboard, only 3 survives whereas the other 18 dies.
- November 28 – South African Airways Flight 295, a Boeing 747-244BM Combi Helderberg, suffers a catastrophic in-flight fire in the cargo area and crashes into the Indian Ocean east of Mauritius, killing all 159 people on board.
- November 29 – A bomb planted by North Korean agents explodes over the Andaman Sea aboard a South Korean Boeing 707-3B5C operating as Korean Air Flight 858, destroying the airliner and killing all 115 people on board.
- November 30 – Since November 16, Iraq has conducted 12 airstrikes against shipping in the Persian Gulf and 10 against urban and economic targets in Iran. Iran has carried out seven airstrikes against Persian Gulf shipping, but none against urban and economic targets in Iraq.

=== December ===
- During the month, Iraq focuses it air campaign against Iran on strikes against shipping in the Persian Gulf, although the Iraqi Air Force also occasionally raids Iranian dams and oil refineries.
- December 7 – David Burke, an angry former employee of USAir, the parent company of Pacific Southwest Airlines, shoots both pilots of Pacific Southwest Airlines Flight 1771, a BAe 146, while it is cruising at 22,000 feet (6,700 m) over the central California coast. No longer under control, the plane pitches down (planes pitch nose up or nose down; they do not pitch "forward") and accelerates, crashing into the ground at a speed of around 700 mph (1,100 km/h) near Cayucos, California, killing all 43 people on board.
- December 8 – A Peruvian Naval Aviation Fokker F27 chartered by the Peruvian association football club Alianza Lima crashes into the Pacific Ocean off the Ventanilla District of Callao, Peru, killing 43 of the 44 people on board. Among the dead are José Casanova, Luis Antonio Escobar, José González Ganoza, Alfredo Tomassini, Johnny Watson, and 11 other players; head coach Marcos Calderon and nine other coaches and team staff; eight cheerleaders; three referees; two Peruvian Navy passengers; and five crew members. The pilot is the only survivor.
- December 15 – Since December 1, Iraq has conducted eight airstrikes against shipping in the Persian Gulf and seven against urban and economic targets in Iran. Iran has carried out five airstrikes against Persian Gulf shipping and two against urban and economic targets in Iraq.
- December 21 – Air Littoral Flight 1919, an Embraer EMB 120 of Air Littoral (operating for Air France), crashed in Bordeaux-Mérignac Airport, France, during landing killing all 16 occupants on board.
- December 22 – The Iraqi Air Force conducts an unusually long-range raid, striking shipping around Iran's Larak Island. The raid hits four supertankers employed as storage ships there, including the world's largest ship, Seawise Giant.
- December 31 – Iraq claims that it has hit four ships in the Persian Gulf since December 26, although none actually have been damaged. Since December 16, Iraq has conducted nine airstrikes against shipping in the Persian Gulf and a single airstrike against urban and economic targets in Iran. Iran has carried out 10 airstrikes against Persian Gulf shipping, but none against urban and economic targets in Iraq. During 1987, Iraq has conducted 83 attacks – mostly by air – on shipping in the Persian Gulf, an increase from 65 in 1986, while Iran has conducted 80, mostly by using surface warships, speedboats, and naval mines. Since 1984, Iraq has attacked 215 ships in the Persian Gulf, destroying 49 and badly damaging nine, while Iran has destroyed 16. Despite the Iraqi and Iranian antishipping campaigns, Iranian oil exports for 1987 are 40 percent higher in 1987 than in 1986 and both Iranian and Iraqi oil exports have increased during the second half of 1987.

== First flights ==
=== February ===
- February 13 – Fokker 50 – First production aircraft.
- February 19 — Boeing E-6 Mercury — First production aircraft.
- February 22 – Airbus A320

=== March ===
- March 9 – Yakovlev Yak-141
- March 19 – Glaser-Dirks DG-500M

=== April ===
- April 15 — Glaser-Dirks DG-600
- April 30 – Promavia Jet Squalus

=== May ===
- May 15 — Starfire Firebolt
- May 16 – Boeing VC-25

=== June ===
- June 10 – Boeing Vertol Model 360
- June 24 – Grob/E-Systems/AlliedSignal Egrett

=== July ===
- July 1 – Questair Venture
- July 20 – PZL M-24 Dromader Super
- July 28 – Wheeler Express

=== August ===
- August 17 – Sukhoi Su-33 (NATO reporting name "Flanker-D")
- August 31 – Mitsubishi H-60

=== October ===
- October 9 – EHI EH101, later rebranded as the AgustaWestland AW101

=== November ===
- November 24 – F-14D Tomcat

=== December ===
- AEA Maverick
- December 29 – Scaled Composites AT^{3}

== Entered service ==
April – Tu-160 in Soviet Air Forces (184th Guards Heavy Bomber Regiment in Pryluki)

== Deadliest crash ==
The deadliest crash of this year was LOT Polish Airlines Flight 5055, a Ilyushin Il-62M which crashed in Warsaw, Poland on 9 May, killing all 183 people on board.
