= Deaths in December 1987 =

The following is a list of notable deaths in December 1987.

Entries for each day are listed alphabetically by surname. A typical entry lists information in the following sequence:

- Name, age, country of citizenship at birth, subsequent country of citizenship (if applicable), reason for notability, cause of death (if known), and reference.

== December 1987 ==
=== 1 ===
- James Baldwin, 63, African-American novelist, playwright and poet (Go Tell It on the Mountain), stomach cancer.
- Donn F. Eisele, 57, American Air Force officer and NASA astronaut (Apollo 7), heart attack.
- Buddy Fogelson, 87, American army colonel, businessman and horse & cattle breeder, husband of Greer Garson.
- Punch Imlach, 69, Canadian NHL ice hockey coach and general manager (Toronto Maple Leafs, Buffalo Sabres), heart attack.
- Wyman Roberts, 72, American basketball player.

=== 2 ===
- Edward Barnsley, 87, English designer and maker of furniture.
- Juan Alberto Melgar Castro, 57, Honduran army officer, president of Honduras, heart attack.
- Robert Filliou, 61, French artist (Fluxus).
- Ferdinando Glück, 86, Italian Olympic cross-country skier (1928).
- Trygve Henrik Hoff, 49, Norwegian singer, composer and writer.
- Luis Federico Leloir, 81, French-born Argentinian physician and biochemist, Nobel laureate in Chemistry, heart attack.
- Hubert Noël, 63, French film actor.
- Myrta Silva, 60, Puerto Rican singer, songwriter and television producer (Sonora Matancera).
- Ernst Steinhoff, 79, Nazi German rocket scientist.
- Princess Red Wing, 91, American tribal elder.
- Yakov Zeldovich, 73, Soviet physicist (black hole evaporation).

=== 3 ===
- Andrew Foster, 62, American pioneer of deaf education in African countries, plane crash.
- Robert Haskell, 84, American politician, Governor of Maine.
- George Seawright, appr. 36, Scottish-born Northern Irish politician, paramilitary in Ulster Volunteer Force, assassinated.
- Yevgeny Tolstikov, 74, Soviet polar explorer, Hero of the Soviet Union.
- Dorin Liviu Zaharia, 43, Romanian musician and composer.

=== 4 ===
- Carlos Colás, 70, Cuban baseball player.
- Pericle Fazzini, 74, Italian painter and sculptor (The Resurrection).
- Bryan Fowler, 89, British polo player and Olympian (1936).
- Meinrad von Lauchert, 82, Nazi German Wehrmacht general.
- Arnold Lobel, 54, American author of children's books (Frog and Toad, Mouse Soup), cardiac arrest.
- Rouben Mamoulian, 90, Georgian-born American film and theatre director (Oklahoma!, Carousel).
- Constantin Noica, 78, Romanian philosopher, essayist and poet.
- Giorgio Prodi, 59, Italian medical scientist and i know

=== 5 ===
- Ye Beihua, 80, Chinese Olympic footballer (1936).
- Pappy Daily, 85, American country music record producer, co-founded record label Starday Records.
- Leonid Dimov, 61, Romanian postmodernist poet and translator, heart attack.
- Bobby Garrett, 55, American NFL footballer (Green Bay Packers), heart attack.
- Daud Kamal, 52, Pakistani poet.
- Rudolf Mentzel, 87, German chemist and Nazi policy-maker.
- Molly O'Day, 64, American country music vocalist, cancer.
- Conny Plank, 47, German record producer and musician, laryngeal cancer.
- Eugene Siler, 87, American politician, member of the U.S. House of Representatives (1955-1965).

=== 6 ===
- George Bernhardt, 68, American football player.
- James Dobson, 67, American film and television actor (Flying Leathernecks), heart attack.
- Jim Johnson, 42, American MLB player (San Francisco Giants).
- Peter Lorenz, 64, German politician, kidnapped by militants, heart attack.
- Ilmari Pakarinen, 77, Finnish Olympic gymnast (1932, 1936).
- David J. Schwartz, 60, American motivational writer and coach (The Magic of Thinking Big).
- Izler Solomon, 77, American orchestra conductor, heart failure.
- Walt Stickel, 65, American NFL player (Chicago Bears, Philadelphia Eagles).
- Ba Swe, 72, Prime Minister of Burma.

=== 7 ===
- Gareth Bennett, 58, British Anglican priest, suicide. (body found on this date)
- Michael Crossley, 75, British World War II Royal Air Force flying ace.
- Michael Hornby, 88, British vice chairman of retail chain WHSmith.
- Jane Mouton, 57, American management theorist.
- Jaime Ongpin, 49, Filipino businessman and politician, Secretary of Finance, suicide.
- Helen Porter, 88, British botanist from Imperial College London.
- Ken Richardson, 72, American MLB player (Philadelphia Athletics, Philadelphia Phillies).
- Denis Rogers, 70, New Zealand doctor and local politician (Mayor of Hamilton), heart attack.

=== 8 ===
- Fay Baker, 70, American actress and writer (The House on Telegraph Hill), breast cancer.
- Sigrid Helliesen Lund, 95, Norwegian peace activist, notably in World War II.
- Joe Gray Taylor, 67, American historian and writer.
- Yolanda Vadiz, 28, Puerto Rican soprano, carbon monoxide poisoning.
- Ulfert Wilke, 80, German-born American painter, museum director and art collector (abstract expressionism), stroke.
- Notable individuals killed in the 1987 Alianza Lima plane crash:
  - Marcos Calderón, 59, Peruvian football coach and player (Sport Boys, Peru).
  - Luis Antonio Escobar, 18, Peruvian international footballer (Club Alianza Lima, Peru).
  - José González Ganoza, 33, Peruvian international footballer (Club Alianza Lima, Peru).
  - Alfredo Tomassini, 23, Peruvian footballer (Club Alianza Lima).
  - Johnny Watson, 24, Peruvian footballer (Club Alianza Lima).

=== 9 ===
- Prince Ernest Augustus of Hanover, 73, German prince, head of the House of Hanover.
- Diana Forbes-Robertson, 72, British writer, stroke.
- François Gall, 75, Hungarian-French modern impressionist painter, heart attack.

=== 10 ===
- Giovanni Arpino, 60, Italian writer and journalist (L'ombra delle colline).
- Jascha Heifetz, 86, Lithuanian-born American violinist, complications from a fall.
- Carlota Jaramillo, 83, Ecuadorian pasillo singer, complications from a fall.
- Stylianos Kyriakides, 77, Greek Cypriot marathon runner and Olympian.
- Slim Lonsdorf, 82, American basketball player.
- Whitey Moore, 75, American MLB player (Cincinnati Reds, St. Louis Cardinals).
- Denis Sanders, 58, American film director and producer (A Time Out of War), heart attack.
- Slam Stewart, 73, American jazz double bass player, heart failure.
- Ollie West, 73, American baseball player.
- John Wickström, 60, Swedish Olympic speed skater (1952).

=== 11 ===
- G. A. Kulkarni, 64, Indian writer of short stories.
- Emil Mazuw, 87, German governor of the Province of Pomerania, convicted of war crimes.
- William Thornton Mustard, 73, Canadian physician and cardiac surgeon, heart attack.
- Rosi Wolfstein, 99, German socialist politician.

=== 12 ===
- Bodil Begtrup, 84, Danish women's rights activist, chairman of the United Nations Commission on the Status of Women.
- Clifton Chenier, 62, American musician, pioneer of zydeco, kidney disease.
- Enrique Jorrín, 60, Cuban charanga violinist, composer and music director.
- Nolan Leary, 98, American actor and playwright.
- Pinky Tomlin, 80, American songwriter, bandleader and actor, heart attack.

=== 13 ===
- Julien Darui, 71, French international footballer (CO Roubaix-Tourcoing, France).
- Bil Dwyer, 80, American cartoonist and humourist (Dumb Dora).
- Bernard Epton, 66, American politician, member of the Illinois House of Representatives, coronary.
- Na. Parthasarathy, 54, Indian writer of Tamil historical novels.
- Josefina Passadori, 87, Italian-born Argentine writer and poet.
- Elias Porter, 73, American psychologist.
- Stanisław Radkiewicz, 84, Polish communist activist, Minister of Public Security.
- Claude T. Smith, 55, American band conductor and composer.
- George Wunder, 75, American cartoonist and comic illustrator (Terry and the Pirates), heart attack.

=== 14 ===
- Copi, (Raúl Damonte Botana), 48, Argentinian writer, cartoonist and playwright, AIDS.
- Merlyn Hans Dethlefsen, 53, American officer of the U.S. Air Force, Medal of Honor recipient.
- Tim Dinsdale, 63, British cryptozoologist, attempted to prove existence of Loch Ness Monster, heart attack.
- Siegfried Haß, 89, Nazi German Wehrmacht general, Knight's Cross of the Iron Cross recipient.
- Milt Josefsberg, 76, American screenwriter, stroke.
- Georg Knöpfle, 83, German international footballer, coach and Olympian (FSV Frankfurt, Germany).
- Valentina Kulagina, 85, Russian painter and designer of books, posters and exhibitions.
- Mogens Lassen, 86, Danish architect and designer.
- Nikos Stavridis, 77, Greek film and theatre actor.
- J. P. Strom, 69, American law enforcement officer, chief of the South Carolina Law Enforcement Division, heart attack.
- John Winterton, 89, British Army officer, Military Governor and Commander of the Free Territory of Trieste.

=== 15 ===
- Seitnebi Abduramanov, 73, Soviet soldier in the Red Army, recipient of the Order of Glory.
- François Borde, 88, French Olympic rugby union player (1920).
- Septima Poinsette Clark, 89, American educator and civil rights activist.
- George Fulford, 85, Canadian businessman and politician, House of Commons member.
- Ángel Infante, 73, Mexican actor and singer.
- Ivo Lapenna, 78, Italian law professor, president of the Universal Esperanto Association.
- Ray Malavasi, 57, American NFL football coach (Los Angeles Rams, Denver Broncos), heart attack.
- Ragnvald Martinsen, 81, Norwegian Olympic cyclist (1928).
- Pierre Massé, 89, French economist, engineer, applied mathematician and high official in the French government.
- Tiny Moore, 67, American Western swing musician.
- P. Ramamurthi, 79, Indian politician, Communist Party of India member.
- Elisabeth Zaisser, 89, German politician, East German Minister of Education.
- Alfred Zerbel, 83, Nazi German Wehrmacht officer, West German Bundeswehr general.

=== 16 ===
- Leonard Beecher, 81, English-born Anglican Archbishop of East Africa.
- Alfons Bērziņš, 71, Latvian Olympic long track speed skater (1936).
- Hob Broun, 37, American author, asphyxiation.
- Minnie Evans, 95, American artist.
- Albert P. Morano, 79, American politician, member of the U.S. House of Representatives (1951-1959), cerebral hemorrhage.
- Monroe M. Redden, 86, American politician, member of the United States House of Representatives (1947-1953).
- John Russell, 66, British politician, member of the House of Lords.

=== 17 ===
- Bernardus Johannes Alfrink, 87, Dutch cardinal, Archbishop of Utrecht.
- Irving Allen, 82, Austro-Hungarian–born American theatre and film producer and director (Climbing the Matterhorn).
- Georges Burou, 77, French gynecologist (sex reassignment surgery), drowned.
- Arkady Raikin, 76, Soviet comedian, actor and director.
- Lucy Walker, (Dorothy Lucie Sanders), 80, Australian romance novelist.
- Linda Wong, 36, American pornographic actress, drug overdose.
- Marguerite Yourcenar, 84, Belgian-born French-American novelist and essayist (Memoirs of Hadrian).

=== 18 ===
- Dimitrije Bašičević, 66, Yugoslavian artist, curator and art critic.
- Leslie Harley, 75, Australian Olympic boxer (1936).
- Chaudhary Rahim Khan, 64, Indian politician, Member of Parliament.
- Warne Marsh, 60, American tenor saxophonist, heart attack.

=== 19 ===
- Murat Aitkhozhin, 48, Soviet molecular biologist.
- Ralph Waldo Christie, 94, American admiral in the U.S. Navy.
- Hermann Claasen, 87, German photographer.
- Cornelius Cook 78, American baseball player.
- Leo Jung, 95, American architect of Orthodox Judaism.
- John F. O'Leary, 61, American administrator of Federal Energy Administration and director of U.S. Bureau of Mines, cancer.
- C. Donald Peterson, 69, American politician, member of the Minnesota House of Representatives, cancer.
- Esther Shiner, 63, Canadian municipal politician, deputy mayor of New York.
- André de la Varre, 83, American filmmaker of travel documentaries.

=== 20 ===
- Ruben Ecleo Sr., 53, Filipino cult leader, founded the Philippine Benevolent Missionaries Association.
- Jake Eisenhart, 65, American Major League baseball player (Cincinnati Reds).
- Eric Harrison, 94, British army officer and Olympic athlete (1924).
- Al Millar, 58, Canadian NHL player (Boston Bruins).
- Dan Sikes, 58, American professional golfer, complications from stomach surgery.

=== 21 ===
- Fred R. Feitshans Jr., 78, American film editor (Wild in the Streets).
- Carl E. McGowan, 76, American lawyer and U.S. circuit judge, cancer.
- Ralph Nelson, 71, American film and television director, writer and actor (Lilies of the Field, Father Goose, Charly), cancer.
- Robert Paige, 76, American actor and TV newscaster and political correspondent (Son of Dracula), aortic aneurysm.
- Arsène Piesset, 68, French Olympic long-distance runner (1948).
- Joe Sherman, 97, American MLB player (Philadelphia Athletics).
- Herb Stock, 87, American NFL player (Columbus Tigers).
- Henry Strater, 91, American painter and illustrator, founded the Ogunquit Museum of American Art.

=== 22 ===
- A. N. Alcaff, 62, Indonesian actor and film director.
- Henry Cotton, 80, English professional golfer, three-time British Open winner.
- Nils Eklöf, 83, Swedish Olympic runner (1928).
- Roderick Firth, 70, American philosopher, professor of philosophy at Harvard, pneumonia.
- Gustav Fröhlich, 85, German actor and film director (Metropolis), complications after surgery.
- Bobby Hogue, 66, American MLB player.
- Rudolph Kampman, 73, Canadian NHL player (Toronto Maple Leafs).
- Mimí Langer, 77, Austrian-born Latin American psychoanalyst and human rights activist, cancer.
- Paule Marrot, 85, French textile designer.
- John McMichael, 39, Northern Irish loyalist (Ulster Defence Association), car bomb.
- Dudley Meredith, 52, American AFL footballer (Buffalo Bills).
- Dorothy M. Needham, 91, English biochemist (muscle biochemistry).
- Geoffrey Parsons, 77, English lyricist.
- José do Patrocínio Oliveira, 83, Brazilian musician and voice actor.
- Luca Prodan, 34, Italian-Scottish musician based in Argentina (Sumo).
- T. Ranganathan, 62, Indian-born American Carnatic musician.
- Alice Terry, 88, American film actress and director (The Four Horsemen of the Apocalypse), Alzheimer's disease.

=== 23 ===
- Paschoal Silva, 87, Brazilian footballer (Brazil).

=== 24 ===
- Asfò Bussotti, 62, Italian Olympic long-distance runner (1952).
- Roy M. Davenport, 78, American rear admiral in the U.S. Navy.
- Nino Espinosa, 34, Dominican Major League baseball player (New York Mets), heart attack.
- Eugen Kogon, 84, German historian and Nazi concentration camp survivor.
- John Wesley Hanes II, 95, American investment banker, Under Secretary of the Treasury, Alzheimer's Disease.
- Betty Noyes, 75, American singer and actress (Singin' in the Rain).
- Josef Myrow, 77, Russian Empire–born American composer ("You Make Me Feel So Young"), Parkinson's disease.
- M. G. Ramachandran, 70, Indian actor and politician, Chief Minister of Tamil Nadu, heart attack and stroke.
- Manoug Parikian, 67, Turkish-born British concert violinist.
- Sara Scuderi, 81, Italian opera singer.
- Joop den Uyl, 68, Dutch politician and journalist, Prime Minister of the Netherlands, brain tumour.
- Kulwant Singh Virk, 66, Indian author, stroke.

=== 25 ===
- Alexander Gregory Barmine, 88, Soviet Army defector to the U.S.A., stroke
- Ruth Bonner, 87, Soviet Communist activist.
- Jimmy Fuller, 95, American baseball player.
- Harry Holm, 85, Danish Olympic gymnast (1920).
- John H. Humphrey, 72, British bacteriologist and immunologist, co-founded the British Society for Immunology.
- Vadim Knizhnik, 25, Soviet physicist (Knizhnik–Zamolodchikov equations), heart attack.
- Gene "Bowlegs" Miller, 54, American trumpeter and band leader, stroke.
- Zita Moulton, 104, American model and actress of theatre and film.
- Nat Tarnopol, 56, American record producer, heart failure.
- Victor Whitsey, 71, British Church of England Bishop of Hertford and Chester, sexual abuser.

=== 26 ===
- J. A. Baker, 61, English author (The Peregrine), cancer.
- S. M. Banerjee, 68, Indian politician, trade unionist and communist sympathiser, member of the Lok Sabha.
- Dorothy Bliss, 71, American carcinologist, cancer.
- Neil Colville, 73, Canadian NHL ice hockey player (New York Rangers).
- Raymond Eugene Plummer, 74, American district judge.
- Melford Stevenson, 85, English barrister and High Court judge, heart attack.
- Rade Sunara, 73, Yugoslavian Olympic rower (1936).
- Leslie Thompson, 86, Jamaican-born English jazz trumpeter and trombonist.
- Luis E. Valcárcel, 96, Peruvian historian, anthropologist and writer, Minister of Education.

=== 27 ===
- Rewi Alley, 90, New Zealand-born Chinese writer and political activist, member of the Chinese Communist Party.
- John Astor, 64, British politician, Member of Parliament.
- Manoj Basu, 86, Indian writer of Bengali novels and short stories.
- Shanti Devi, 61, Indian woman who claimed to remember her previous life.
- Priscilla Dean, 91, American theatre and silent-screen actress (The Gray Ghost), complications from a fall.
- Josef Grohé, 85, German Nazi Party official, Gauleiter of Gau Cologne-Aachen.
- Bernard Hailstone, 77, English painter.
- Lefty Holmes, 80, American baseball player.
- Vivian Hultman, 84, American NFL player.
- Tetsuo Imai, 75, Japanese Olympic middle-distance runner (1936).
- Theodore Pike, 83, Irish colonial administrator and rugby union international, governor of British Somaliland.
- Stepan Popel, 78, Ukrainian chess champion.
- Wilbur Schramm, 80, American scholar and authority on mass communication.
- Anthony West, 73, English author and literary critic, son of H. G. Wells, stroke.

=== 28 ===
- Happy Akhand, 27, Bangladeshi rock singer and songwriter (Miles.
- Hank Bartos, 74, American NFL player (Washington Redskins).
- George I. Forsythe, 69, American general of the U.S. Army.
- John Hunt, 82, British general practitioner, co-founded the Royal College of General Practitioners.
- Edward Kleban, 48, American musical theatre composer and lyricist, throat cancer.
- Charles Malik, 81, Lebanese diplomat, philosopher and politician, Lebanese representative to the U.N., kidney failure.
- Jim Murphy, 84, Irish Olympic boxer (1932).
- Joseph Sittler, 83, American Lutheran minister and theologian, cancer.

=== 29 ===
- John F. Aiso, 78, American nisei military leader, lawyer and judge, head injury sustained in a mugging.
- Sheldon Andelson, 56, American higher education administrator and a political fund-raiser, AIDS.
- Patrick Bissell, 30, American ballet dancer (American Ballet Theatre), overdose.
- Hal Griggs, 87, American NFL player.
- Brigitte Heinrich, 46, German journalist and politician, member of the European Parliament, heart attack.
- Jun Ishikawa, 88, Japanese author, lung cancer.
- Knud Jacobsen, 73, Danish Olympic cyclist (1936).
- Wilbert E. Moore, 73, American sociologist, president of the American Sociological Association.
- Ulysses Kae Williams, 66, American DJ, record label owner and producer.
- Yanina Zhejmo, 78, Soviet actress.

=== 30 ===
- Leslie Arliss, 86, English screenwriter and director (The Man in Grey, The Wicked Lady).
- Datta Naik, 60, Indian film music director.
- Manolo Urquiza, 67, Cuban-born media personality.
- Max Walter, 82, German Olympic weightlifter (1936).
- Theodore Zichy, 79, British actor, photographer and film director, suicide.

=== 31 ===
- Alessandro D'Ottavio, 60, Italian Olympic boxer (1948).
- George Doherty, 67, American NFL footballer, college coach and athletics administrator, heart attack.
- Merle Evans, 96, American cornet player and circus band conductor (Ringling Bros. and Barnum & Bailey Circus).
- Randall Garrett, 60, American science fiction and fantasy author (Lord Darcy).
- Gene Leggett, 52, American Methodist minister, defrocked for being homosexual, hepatitis.
- Leo Steiner, 47–48, American restauranteur, co-owner of Carnegie Deli, brain tumour.
- Jerry Turner, 58, American television news anchorman, esophageal cancer.

=== Unknown date ===
- Malcolm Butler, 75, Northern Irish international footballer (Accrington Stanley, Ireland).
- Michael Clemente, 79, New York mobster in the Genovese crime family.
- Dorothy K. Haynes, 68–69, Scottish horror and supernatural writer, breast cancer.
- Kurt Frederick Ludwig, 83–84, Nazi German spy.
- Birendra Nath Mazumdar, 82, Indian medical officer in the Royal Army Medical Corps.
- Marcus Owen, 52, Welsh professional snooker player.
- Ian Wilson, 86, English actor.
