= José Casanova =

José Casanova is the name of:

- José Casanova (footballer), Peruvian footballer
- José Casanova (sociologist), American sociologist
