= Aero Engineers Australia =

Aeronautical Engineers Australia
- Founded: 1978
- Headquarters: Adelaide, Australia
- Products: Aeronautical Engineering Services, Aircraft Weight Control, Flammability Testing, Flight Testing, Systems Integration, Project Management
- Number of employees: 45+
- Parent: Nova Systems
- Subsidiaries: Airline Technical Services

Aeronautical Engineers Australia (AEA) is an Australian aeronautical engineering consultancy and aircraft technical service provider. It is the largest civil aircraft design organisation in the Asia Pacific region and is now headquartered in Adelaide.

== History ==
AEA was established by Graham Swannell in Perth in 1978 in order fill the gap in airworthiness people authorised to approve the design of modifications and repairs in Western Australia. Originally starting with a few desks in a part-owned hangar at Jandakot Airport, the practice grew and moved to its current location at 1 Eagle Drive in 1990. In 1995, the company established its second office at Parafield Airport in Adelaide to widen its client base and better serve existing customers in the Adelaide region. In 2000, AEA joined with HSJ aviation and founded its third office at Sydney's Bankstown Airport. The company has since gone on to establish offices at Brisbane and Melbourne.

In 2003, a Cessna 404 crashed at Jandakot Airport. On investigation, the Australian Transport Safety Bureau found a replacement bush used in one of the engine fuel pumps and approved by AEA had seized, causing the engine to fail shortly after takeoff. The pilot chose to turn the plane around to attempt a landing at the airport. However the plane’s speed fell below the best airspeed and it crashed in bushland. The pilot's quick actions saved the lives of three passengers. The families and employer of the victims are suing the Civil Aviation Safety Authority though AEA, as many of the other companies involved have since ceased trading.

In 2010 AEA was bought by the Nova Defence Group to expand Nova's business into the commercial sector.

== Services ==
AEA provides a variety of services to the general aviation industry, including the design and certification of aircraft modifications, repairs and testing of aircraft components, aircraft weight control (aircraft reweighs, trimsheets and loading systems) in accordance with Civil Aviation Order 100.7 (CAO 100.7), design and manufacture of aircraft components (such as cargo nets, replacement parts, survey installations, equipment frames, skis, etc.) under a Production Certificate and Civil Aviation Safety Regulation Part 21 (CASR 21), flammability testing to FAR/JAR25.853 and similar provisions, systems integration, flight and performance testing, aircraft design, aeronautical consultancy, civil/military platform design etc.

Additionally Airline Technical Services was established as a wholly owned subsidiary of AEA to provide speciality services to the airline sector, and Swannell Racing now provides roll cage homologation services to the local racing industry.

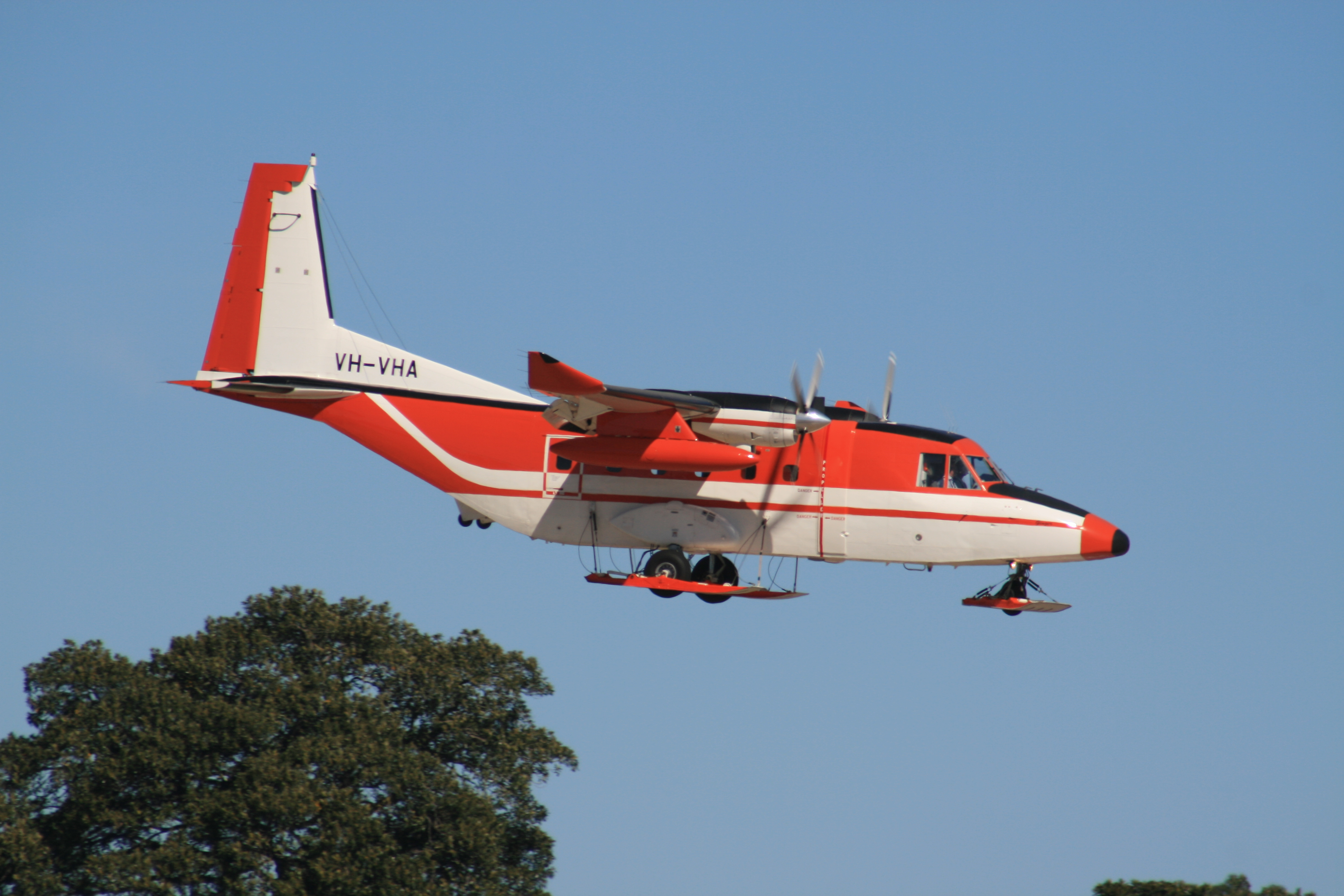
CASA 212-400 with AEA designed skis

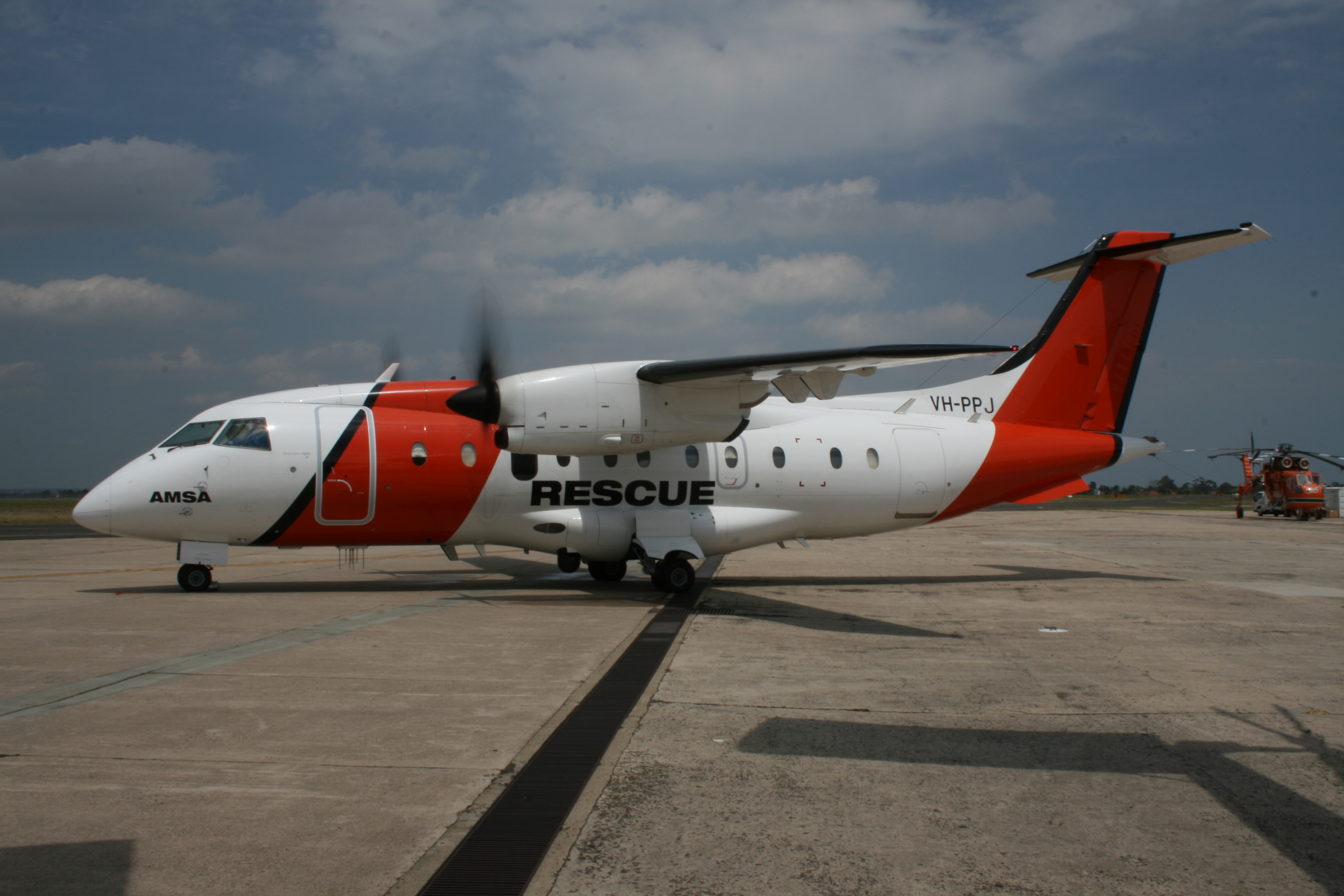
Dornier 328 with AEA Inflight Opening Door

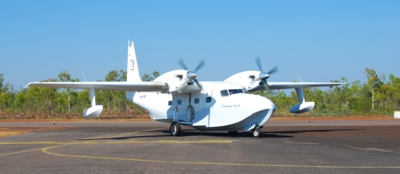
Grumman Turbo Mallard

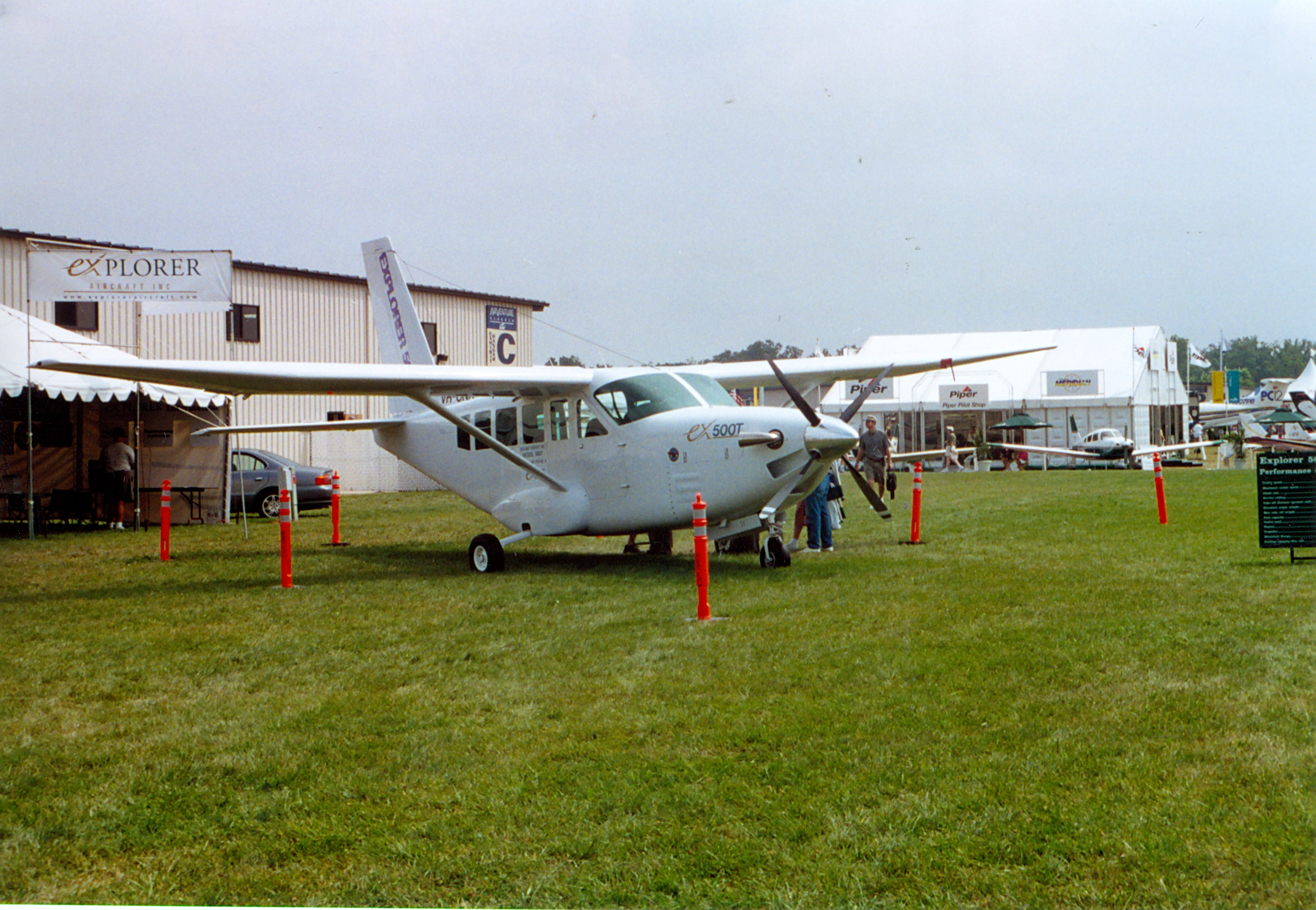
Explorer 500T

== Major projects ==
- CASA 212 Skiplane for Skytraders
- Fokker 50 Hardened Cockpit Door for Skywest and Alliance Airlines
- Dornier 328 Inflight Opening Door for AeroRescue
- Grumman G-73 Turbo Mallard Conversion for Paspaley Pearling
- Pilatus PC-12 Aeromedical Conversion for the Royal Flying Doctor Service
- Cessna 441 Life Extension Program for TAE

== Aircraft designs ==
Since the 1980s, AEA has also been involved in the design of a number of whole aircraft projects including the Eagle 150B and the Explorer.

The Explorer is a high-performance but rugged utility aircraft that can perform a wide variety of roles at a lower cost than other equivalent aircraft. It was developed to cope with the harsh Australian conditions and unprepared dirt strips but still deliver a 180 kn cruise, almost 1000 nmi range and economical performance. The aircraft utilises the latest in aerofoil design, a carbon fibre fuselage shell, a unique retractable undercarriage, flat cabin floor, and a newly devised construction method that minimises construction and assembly time. The aircraft was initially developed as the 350R but now incorporates the 500T turbine variant and the stretched 750T.

AEA conceived, designed and developed the Explorer and started Explorer Aircraft Australia Pty Ltd to develop and market the family of aircraft. As the Explorer project grew, this role was passed onto Explorer Aircraft Inc. which is now located in Houston, Texas. To date, no funding has been received to continue the project to the development stage.

- Eagle Aircraft 150B---- (1997) Single-engine two-seat civil utility aircraft with conventional tailplane and canard surfaces. Composite construction
- AEA Maverick------------ (1987) Single-engine one-seat sport aircraft of composite construction
- Explorer 500R------------ (1998) Single-engine high-wing transport aircraft. Piston engine
- Explorer 500T------------ (2000) Turboprop version of 500R
- Explorer 750T------------ (____) Stretched version of 500T

== Role ==
Under Civil Aviation Regulation 42U (CAR42U), any modification or repair that is carried out on an Australian aircraft must be done in accordance with 'approved data'. This approved data is usually contained within the aircraft's manuals (aircraft maintenance manual, structural repair manual, component maintenance manuals etc.) issued by the aircraft's manufacturer. However, sometimes there is damage to the aircraft that is outside the scope of these manuals or the operator wishes to modify the aircraft to help it perform a specific function (aerial firefighting, search and rescue) or alter the aircraft in some other way. To ensure that the aircraft continues to be airworthy (i.e. safe to fly), the repair or modification must be examined by an aeronautical engineer so that the many complex factors that affect aircraft flight, structures and systems can be assessed and the design change approved as airworthy. To do this the engineer assesses the design of the modification or repair against the airworthiness requirements for the aircraft and then must justify that the design meets these requirements through the use of analysis, testing and experience. If the design has been shown to meet the airworthiness requirements it may be approved under Civil Aviation Regulation 35 (CAR35) and is hence 'approved data', satisfying CAR42U.

Provisions similar to CAR42U exist for how to and what to use when performing maintenance on an aircraft under CAR42V. If maintenance personnel wish to deviate from the aircraft's approved maintenance data, the materials and procedures need to be approved under CAR36A.

AEA, along with other similar approved persons around Australia, is an approved design authority under CAR35 and CAR36 (for the approval of replacement components). AEA is also approved under the Papua New Guinea Civil Aviation Rules Part 146 which mirrors CAR35 for PNG registered (P2 registered) aircraft.
