= AEA Maverick =

It was a retired plane made by aero engineer australia

General information
- Type: Light Sport Aircraft
- National origin: Australia
- Manufacturer: Aero Engineers Australia
- Designer: Graham Swannell and Geoff Danes

History
- First flight: December 1987

The Aero Engineers Australia (AEA) Maverick is a single-seat sportsplane of conventional configuration. Constructed largely of composite materials, it is powered by a 75 kW (100 hp) Continental O-200A engine and is capable of manoeuvres with loads of up to +6 or −3 g.

The sole example of the aircraft was registered as VH-JOX and resides in New South Wales, Australia. This aircraft first flew in December 1987.

== Specifications (AEA Maverick) ==
General characteristics

- Crew: one, pilot
- Length: 5.41 m (17 ft 9 in)
- Wingspan: 5.79 m (19 ft 0 in)
- Height: 1.83 m (6 ft 0 in)
- Wing area: 5.6 m^{2} (60 sq ft)
- Empty weight: 295 kg (650 lb)
- Gross weight: 477 kg (1,050 lb)
- Powerplant: 1 × Continental O-200A , 75 kW (101 hp)

Performance

- Maximum speed: 363 km/h (226 mph, 196 kn)
- Wing loading: 85 kg/m^{2} (17.4 lb/sq ft)
- Power/mass: 160 W/kg (0.10 hp/lb)
