= Javier Heraud =

Peruvian poet

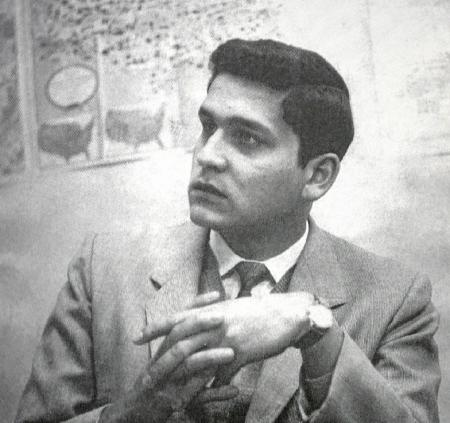
- Born: Javier Heraud Pérez; January 19, 1942; Lima, Peru
- Died: May 15, 1963 (aged 21); Puerto Maldonado, Peru
- Education: Markham College, Pontifical Catholic University of Peru
- Occupations: Poet, Revolutionary
- Writing career
- Language: Spanish
- Years active: 1960–1963
- Genre: Poetry
- Notable works: El río, El viaje, Estación reunida

Javier Heraud Pérez (Latin American Spanish: [xaˈβjeɾ eˈɾawð ˈpeɾes], French: [ʒavje eʁo, ʁavje -]; 1942–1963) was a Peruvian poet and member of the Ejército de Liberación Nacional (ELN). In his early life he studied at Markham College and later he continued his studies at Pontifical Catholic University of Peru.

In January 1963, a group led by the 21-year-old poet Javier Heraud and Alain Elías crossed through Bolivia, where they picked up weapons, and entered southern Peru. Plagued by Leishmaniasis infection however, the 15 member team decided to enter the city of Puerto Maldonado to seek out medical supplies. The local police were warned of the group's advance, and on May 15 Heraud was shot in the chest and killed while he drifted past the town in a dugout canoe.

== Publications ==
- El río (1960)
- El viaje (1961)
- Estación reunida (1961)

=== Work published in anthologies ===
- Ricardo Silva Santisteban (anthologist): Antología general de la traducción en el Perú (General anthology of translation in Peru). Lima, Universidad Ricardo Palma - Editorial Universitaria, 2016.
