= 1986 in aviation =

This is a list of aviation-related events from 1986.

== Events ==
=== January ===
- January 9 – The United Kingdom's Secretary of State for Defence, Michael Heseltine, resigns amidst a political furore over the future of Westland Helicopters. Two weeks later, Leon Brittan, the Trade and Industry Secretary, also will resign.
- January 14 – French singer and songwriter Daniel Balavoine, French motorcycle racer Thierry Sabine, and French search-and-rescue helicopter pilot François-Xavier Bagnoud die when their Eurocopter AS350 Écureuil crashes into a sand dune in Mali during a sandstorm. The other two people on board, a reporter and her photographer, also die.
- January 28 – VASP Flight 210, a Boeing 737, accidentally tries to take off from a taxiway, and slams into a dyke, killing 1 passenger.
- January 28 – The Space Shuttle Challenger exploded 73 seconds later after the launch. The explosion killed all seven crew members inside the shuttle.
- January 31 – Boeing completes its purchase of de Havilland Canada.

=== February ===
- French Air Force Jaguar ground-attack aircraft help the government of Chad beat back an invasion from Libya by Chadian rebel and Libyan troops.
- February 6 – Last flight of the Airlink helicopter shuttle service between London Gatwick and London Heathrow Airports.
- February 7 – A United States Air Force C-141B Starlifter departs François Duvalier International Airport outside Port-au-Prince, Haiti, carrying Haitian president Jean-Claude Duvalier into exile in France.
- February 12 – United States Navy aircraft carriers commence exercises in the Gulf of Sirte, off the coast of Libya, challenging that country's territorial claims to those waters.
- February 17
  - During the first week of an Iranian ground offensive against al-Faw, Iraq, Iraq claims to have flown up to 355 fighter and 134 attack helicopter sorties per day against Iranian forces, losing 15 to 30 aircraft. Bad weather and Iranian use of the cover of darkness have made the Iraqi air operations ineffective.
  - Using thermals, American pilot Robert Harris sets a world altitude record for gliders, piloting a Burkhard Grob 102 to 49,000 feet (14,935 meters). The record will stand until August 2006.
- February 21 – On February 21, 1986, USAir Flight 499, a scheduled domestic passenger flight operated by a McDonnell Douglas DC-9-31, overran the runway and crashed at Erie International Airport. One passenger suffered minor injuries, while the other 17 passengers and 5 crew were uninjured.
- February 25 – A small fleet of American military helicopters evacuates deposed President of the Philippines Ferdinand Marcos and his entourage from Manila to Clark Air Force Base. The following day, he goes into exile in Hawaii.

=== March ===
- March 3 – An Iranian helicopter attacks a Turkish tanker in the Persian Gulf. It is the first of several Iranian helicopter attacks against ships in the Persian Gulf.
- March 13 – The Iraqi Air Force bombs the Qotar Bridge, an important link between Iran and Turkey.
- March 24 – Combat breaks out in the Gulf of Sidra between Libyan military forces and an American naval force which includes the aircraft carriers USS Saratoga (CV-60), USS America (CV-66), and USS Coral Sea (CV-43). Two Libyan MiG-23 fighters engage in a dogfight with two U.S. Navy F-14 Tomcats, although none of the aircraft involved fire at each other; Libyan forces ashore fire surface-to-air missiles (SAMs) at American aircraft, scoring no hits; and U.S. Navy aircraft attack Libyan radars, SAM sites, and warships, sinking two vessels.
- March 25 – An Antonov An-32 belonging to the Indian Air Force disappeared somewhere over the Arabian Sea along with seven occupants on board.
- March 31
  - Since fighting over al-Faw, Iraq, began on 9 February, Iran claims to have shot down an average of seven Iraqi fighters a day, while Iraq claims to have shot down several Iranian F-4 Phantom II fighters. The Iraqi Air Force has flown several hundred sorties per day during the fighting, and claims to have flown 18,648 sorties over al-Faw since 9 February.
  - The center landing gear tire of the Mexicana Boeing 727-264 Veracruz, operating as Flight 940, explodes in flight after being inappropriately filled with compressed air instead of nitrogen. Before the plane can reach an airport to make an emergency landing, it breaks in half, catches fire, and crashes on El Carbón mountain near Maravatío, Michoacán, Mexico, killing all 167 people on board. It remains the deadliest aviation accident in Mexican history and the deadliest involving a Boeing 727.

=== April ===
- April 2 – A bomb planted by the Arab Revolutionary Cells terrorist group explodes over Argos, Greece, aboard Trans World Airlines Flight 840, a Boeing 727-231 with 122 people on board on a flight from Rome, Italy, to Athens, Greece. The explosion blows four passengers, all Americans and one of them a nine-month-old baby, out of the plane and they fall to their deaths; the rapid decompression of the cabin that follows injures seven other passengers, and the aircraft makes an emergency landing.
- April 14–15 (overnight) – 18 United States Air Force F-111Fs of the 48th Tactical Fighter Wing and a United States Navy force of 15 A-6E Intruders, six A-7E Corsair IIs, and six F/A-18 Hornets from the aircraft carriers USS Saratoga (CV-60), USS America (CV-66), and USS Coral Sea (CV-43) attack Libya in Operation El Dorado Canyon, with the loss of one F-111 and its two-man crew. The U.S. Air Force component of the raid is the first U.S. bomber mission launched from British soil since 1945; refused permission to fly over France and Spain, the F-111s make a 2,800-mile (4,500-km) flight down the Atlantic Ocean and across the Mediterranean Sea to reach Libya from England; they must be refueled several times in the air and their round-trip flight takes 14 hours.
- April 17 – Israeli security guards at London Heathrow Airport discover explosives in the luggage of an Irish woman attempting to board an El Al airliner. Her Jordanian fiancé, Nezar Hindawi, is arrested for planting the bomb without her knowledge in an effort to destroy the airliner.
- April 18 – French aircraft industrialist Marcel Dassault (born Marcel Bloch) dies at 94.
- April 27 – Jane Dornacker survives her first crash, with the pilot Bob Banes, of an Enstrom F-28C into the Hackensack River.
- April 28 – Pan American World Airways resumes service to the Soviet Union, using a Boeing 747 from John F. Kennedy International Airport in New York.

=== May ===
- May 3
  - A bomb believed to have been planted by the Liberation Tigers of Tamil Eelam detonates aboard Air Lanka Flight 512, the Lockheed L-1011-385 TriStar City of Colombo, while it is on the ground at Bandaranaike International Airport in Katunayake, Sri Lanka, with 148 people on board. The explosion rips the plane in two, killing 21 people and injuring 41.
  - China Airlines Flight 334, a Boeing 747-2R7F/SCD registered as B-198, was hijacked by the captain after subduing the first officer and the flight engineer. He diverted the aircraft to China to defect over there. A year later, in 1987, the other pilots were reunioned with their families.
- May 7
  - The Iraqi Air Force carries out a major air raid against Tehran, Iran, setting Iran's largest oil refinery ablaze and damaging one of its processing units. It is the last Iraqi air attack against Tehran until December 13.
  - Self-taught American aircraft designer Al Mooney dies, aged 80.
- May 16 – The movie Top Gun, which glamorizes United States Navy aviation, opens in theaters in the United States.
- May 23 – The Iraqi Air Force raids Iran's Yarchin arms factory.
- May 24 – American astronaut Stephen Thorne is riding as a passenger in an Aerotec Pitts S-2 aerobatic plane performing maneuvers near Santa Fe, Texas, when its pilot becomes distracted by a short circuit in the electrical system. The plane spins into the ground, killing both Thorne and the pilot.
- May 26 – Michel Vaujour escapes from a jail in Paris, France, in a helicopter flown by his wife, a newly graduated helicopter pilot.
- May 29 – June 1 – The 5th FAI World Rally Flying Championship takes place in Castellón de la Plana, Spain. Individual winners are 1. Krzysztof Lenartowicz and Janusz Darocha (Poland), 2. Carlos Eugui Aguado and Jose Anizonda (Spain), 3. (tie) Wacław Nycz and Marian Wieczorek (Poland) and Witold Świadek and Andrzej Korzeniowski (Poland). Team winners are 1. Poland, 2. West Germany, 3. Spain.

=== June ===
- Iran takes delivery of night vision goggles for its AB-212 helicopter pilots and subsystems giving the AB-212s the capability to fire AS.12 air-to-surface missiles in night anti-ship attacks.
- June 4 – Los Angeles, California's KFI radio "Eye in the Sky" traffic reporter Bruce Wayne is killed when his Cessna 177B Cardinal suffers engine problems just after takeoff from Fullerton Municipal Airport in Fullerton, California, strikes the top of an unoccupied semi-trailer truck, and crashes and explodes in an industrial area one-half mile (0.8 km) from the runway. Two weeks later, he would have celebrated his 25th year as a Los Angeles-area flying traffic reporter.
- June 9 – The Iraqi Air Force launches the first of two raids against Iran's satellite dish at Assadabad.
- June 17 – The last flight ever by a Boeing B-47 Stratojet takes place when B-47E-25-DT 52-0166, restored to flight status for a one-time-only ferry move, flies from Naval Weapons Center China Lake, California, to Castle Air Force Base, California, for museum display.
- June 18 – Two Grand Canyon sightseeing aircraft – a Helitech Bell 206 helicopter and Grand Canyon Airlines Flight 6, a de Havilland Canada DHC-6 Twin Otter – collide over Grand Canyon National Park in Arizona and crash, killing all five people on the helicopter and all 20 on board the Twin Otter.
- June 22 to 28 – The Federation Aeronatique Internationale holds the 5th World Helicopter Championships at Castle Ashby in Northamptonshire, England.
- June 24 – Iraqi aircraft fly over Iran's Sirri Island for the first time, but do not attack Iranian facilities or shipping there.
- June 30 – Continental Airlines emerges from bankruptcy with improved asset and cash flow positions and a more competitive route structure, with service to every large city in the United States from its hubs at Denver, Colorado, and Houston, Texas.

=== July ===
- The chief of the Iraqi Navy, Rear Admiral Abed Mohammed Abdullah, claims that Iraq has destroyed 58 Iranian tankers, 85 other merchant ships, and 40 supply ships since the Iran–Iraq War began in September 1980.
- Royal Air Maroc's first Boeing 757 sets a new nonstop distance record for the type on its delivery flight, flying 9,103 km (5,653 miles) from Seattle, Washington, to Casablanca, Morocco, the longest Boeing 757 flight since a flight of 7,907 kkm (4,910 miles) from Tokyo to Seattle in November 1982. The plane carries 38 people and a payload of 10,645 kg (23,467 pounds) and uses 37,563 liters (9,923 U.S. gallons; 7,939 Imperial gallons) of fuel.
- Royal Air Maroc becomes the first African airline to introduce the Boeing 757 into service.
- July 1 – The Piasecki PA-97 Helistat, an experimental American heavy-lift aircraft combining a blimp envelope with four Sikorksy H-34J helicopter fuselages, disintegrates and crashes at Naval Air Engineering Station Lakehurst in Lakehurst, New Jersey, while taxiing after a hover test flight, killing one test pilot and injuring four others. The crash ends the Helistat program.
- July 2
  - The Iraqi Air Force makes its second attack on the Iranian satellite dish at Assadabad. The 9 June and 2 July attacks destroy the dish, knocking out most of Iran's international telephone and telex links for nearly two weeks.
  - Aeroflot Flight 2306 crashes during an emergency landing at the outskirts of Syktyvkar in the Soviet Union, killing 54 people.
- July 3 – Iraq announces that Iran has captured Mehran, Iran, in an assault that began on 20 June. Command and control problems have prevented the Iraqi Air Force from making the maximum use of its aircraft in opposing the Iranians. During the critical phase of the battle, it flew only 33 helicopter sorties despite a maximum capacity of over 500 sorties, and only 100 air-support missions despite a maximum capacity of over 300.
- July 15 – Flying the Rutan Voyager in a circuit over the Pacific Ocean off the coast of California, Dick Rutan and Jeanna Yeager complete a non-stop, unrefueled flight of 111 hours 44 minutes, covering 11,857 statute miles (19,093 km). The flight breaks the previous unrefueled endurance record of 84 hours 32 minutes set in May 1931 and the previous unrefueled non-stop distance record of 11,336 statute miles (18,254 km) set by a U.S. Air Force B-52 Stratofortress in January 1962.
- July 20 – After a three-month lull, the Iraqi Air Force resumes the bombing of area targets in Iran.
- July 27 – An Iraqi Air Force raid on Arak, Iran, kills at least 70 civilians.
- July 30 – Since July 20, Iraqi Air Force raids against Iran have struck a sugar factory, an oil refinery, military camps, and urban targets in Arak, Marivan, and Sanandaj.

=== August ===
- Iranian AB-212 helicopters attack a Greek cargo ship in the Persian Gulf with AS.12 air-to-surface missiles.
- During the month, the total number of ships struck in the Persian Gulf reaches 45 to 60 since January 1 and approximately 280 since 1983.
- August 10 – Iraqi Air Force aircraft strike the oil refinery at Tabriz, Iran.
- August 11 – A Westland Lynx fitted with special composite rotor blades sets a new helicopter world speed record of 249.09 mph (400.87 km/h) over a 15 km (9.3 mi) course.
- August 12 – Iraqi aircraft raid Iran's Sirri Island for the first time, hitting three tankers there.
- August 16 – Using a Strela 2 (SAM-7 Grail) surface-to-air missile, the Sudan People's Liberation Army shoots down a Sudan Airways Fokker F-27 Friendship 400M taking off from Malakai, Sudan, killing all 60 people on board.
- August 17 – First flight of Tsunami, an experimental purpose-built racing aircraft.
- August 18 – Iranian aircraft attack the Liberian tanker Akarita off the United Arab Emirates' Fateh oil terminal, setting the ship afire. All 39 of Akarita's crew safely abandon the badly damaged ship.
- August 20 – The first test-flight of a propfan engine, the General Electric GE-36, occurs.
- August 22 – A United States Air Force F-15A Eagle performs the fourth of five test launches of the ASM-135 anti-satellite missile. The missile's third stage, the Miniature Homing Vehicle (MHV) interceptor, is pointed at a star to simulate targeting a satellite, and the test is fully successful.
- August 24 – Frontier Airlines files for bankruptcy and ceases operations.
- August 31 – Aeroméxico Flight 498, a McDonnell Douglas DC-9-32 with 64 people on board, and a privately owned Piper PA-28-181 Archer collide in mid-air over Cerritos, California. The collision decapitates all three people on the Archer and both aircraft crash, also killing everyone on board the DC-9 and 15 people on the ground, a total death toll of 82. Eight people on the ground suffer injuries.
- By late August, Iraqi Air Force aircraft have flown 120 sorties against Iran's Kharg Island over the preceding twelve months.

=== September ===
- September 2 – Iraqi fixed-wing aircraft, helicopters, and artillery strike up to 2,000 Iranian Islamic Revolutionary Guard Corps troops attempting to move by small boat from Ras-ol-Bisheh, Iran, to the Al Amayah and Al Bakr oil platforms in the Persian Gulf. None arrive at the Al Bakr platform, and the strikes stop all but 130 of them from arriving at the Al Amayah platform. Iraqi paratroops soon land on and capture the Al Amayah platform.
- September 5 – Four armed men of the Abu Nidal Organization storm the Pan American World Airways Boeing 747-121 Clipper Empress of the Seas, operating as Flight 73 with 379 people on board, while it is on the ground at Jinnah International Airport in Karachi, Pakistan; the pilots, copilot, and flight engineer escape, grounding the plane. The hijackers soon murder one passenger; after power aboard the aircraft later shuts down, the hijackers open fire on the passengers and crew, prompting Pakistani Army Special Services Group commandos to storm the plane immediately as the hostages evacuate the aircraft via emergency exits. Nineteen more of the hostages die and 120 are injured.
- September 7 – Iraqi Air Force aircraft strike Iranian oil-loading points on Lavan Island in the Persian Gulf.
- September 9 – Delta Air Lines and Western Airlines agree to merge. The merger will be completed in April 1987.
- September 16 – Iraqi Air Force aircraft conduct a highly successful series of raids against Iran's Kharg Island, temporarily forcing Iran to reduce its oil exports.
- September 19 – Sichuan Airlines is founded. It will begin flight operations in July 1988.
- September 23 – An Iranian helicopter hits a British merchant ship with an air-to-surface missile in the Persian Gulf.
- September 25 – Iranian AB-212 helicopters hit the British tanker Pawnee with AS.12 air-to-surface missiles in the Persian Gulf. The attack brings the total number of anti-shipping strikes in the Persian Gulf since March 1984 to 144.
- September 29
  - Iraqi Air Force aircraft conduct an exceptionally successful raid against the Iranian oil terminal at Kharg Island.
  - A United States Air Force F-15A Eagle performs the fifth and final test launch of the ASM-135 anti-satellite missile. The missile's third stage, the Miniature Homing Vehicle (MHV) interceptor, is pointed at a star to simulate targeting a satellite, and the test is fully successful.
- September 30 – Trans International Airlines ceases operations and is dissolved.

=== October ===
- October 6 – The Iraqi Air Force conducts another exceptionally successful raid against Iran's oil terminal on Kharg Island, temporarily closing out the last two operational terminals there. Iran's oil exports fall to half of normal levels.
- October 19 – President Samora Machel of Mozambique is among 34 people killed in the crash of the Mozambican presidential plane, a Tupolev Tu-134, in the Lebombo Mountains near Mbuzini, South Africa, during a flight from Lusaka, Zambia, to Maputo, Mozambique. There are 10 survivors.
- October 20 – Aeroflot Flight 6502 crashes in Kuybyshev (now Samara), in the Soviet Union, killing 70 people.
- October 21 – British Airways is offered for public sale by the British government.
- October 22 – While WNBC 660 AM flying traffic reporter Jane Dornacker – a former rock musician, actress, and comedian – makes a traffic report over Manhattan in New York City, her Enstrom F-28F Falcon helicopter suffers a mechanical failure at an altitude of 75 feet (23 meters) due to the installation of an improper clutch, strikes a fence, and crashes into the Hudson River. It was Dornacker's second helicopter crash of the year while reporting traffic, and the broadcast captures her saying "Hit the water! Hit the water! Hit the water!" as the helicopter goes down. The pilot William Pate survives with serious injuries, but Dornacker dies on the way to the hospital.
- October 25
  - Piedmont Airlines Flight 467, a Boeing 737-200 with 119 people on board, overruns the end of the runway while landing at Charlotte/Douglas International Airport in Charlotte, North Carolina. There are no fatalities, but 34 people are injured, three of them seriously.
  - Michael Sergio is arrested immediately after he parachutes onto the field at Shea Stadium in Queens, New York, displaying a "Let's Go Mets" banner during the first inning of the sixth game of the 1986 World Series between the New York Mets and Boston Red Sox. He later is sentenced to six months in jail after refusing to reveal the identity of the pilot of the airplane from which he parachuted.
- October 26 – Trans World Airlines acquires Ozark Airlines and merges Ozark into its operations.

=== November ===
- November 3 – While attempting to land at Zahedan Airport in Zahedan, Iran, an Islamic Republic of Iran Air Force C-130 Hercules military transport plane crashes into a mountain, killing all 103 people on board.
- November 6 – A British International Helicopters Boeing 234LR Chinook helicopter crashes into the North Sea while on approach to land at Sumburgh Airport in the Shetland Islands, killing 45 of the 47 people on board and injuring both survivors. It is history's worst civilian helicopter disaster.
- November 14 – A wheel-well stowaway inside a Boeing 707 survives a flight from Panama to Miami at an altitude of 39,000 feet (10,242 meters).
- November 25 – WKRC radio flying traffic reporter Nancy McCormick and her pilot are killed when their Bell 206B helicopter flies into fog and crashes into rising terrain in Cincinnati, Ohio.
- November 25–26 – The Iraqi Air Force conducts a two-day series of major air raids against Iran, employing 54 aircraft and striking a Hawk surface-to-air missile site near Dezful, Iran, an Islamic Republic of Iran Army base, an air base, the Andimeshk railroad station, and the oil transshipment site on Larak Island. The Larak Island strike on November 25 is Iraq's first there; the Iraqi Air Force uses Mirage F-1EQ-5 fighters flying 1,560 miles (2,512 km), demonstrating a new reach for Iraqi aircraft, and hits several ships – raising to 90 the number of tankers hit in the Persian Guklf during 1986 – although two Iraqi Mirages are forced to land in Saudi Arabia when they run low on fuel. On the day of the Larak Island strike, Iraqi Air Force aircraft fly a total of 164 combat sorties, many of them over the front lines with Iran.
- November 27 – Iraq conducts its 250th airstrike against Iran' Kharg Island and claims to have knocked out all oil loading capabilities there.

=== December ===
- During the month, the U.S. Navy conducts the first shipboard trials of the Pioneer (later RQ-2 Pioneer) unmanned aerial vehicle aboard the battleship USS Iowa (BB-61) in the Chesapeake Bay.
- December 2 – An Air France Concorde returns to Paris after an 18-day around-the-world trip with 94 passengers.
- December 11 – The United States Department of Transportation approves the merger of Delta Air Lines and Western Airlines. The merger will be completed in April 1987.
- December 13 – The Iraqi Air Force conducts its first air raid against Tehran since May 7, striking a power plant and an anti-aircraft installation.
- December 14–23 – The Voyager, piloted by Dick Rutan and Jeana Yeager, makes the first non-stop flight around the planet without refueling. The flight covers a distance of 42,432 km (26,366 statute miles), although the international governing body for aeronautic world records, the Fédération Aéronautique Internationale (FAI), accredits the distance as 40,212 km (24,972 statute miles). The flight nonetheless sets a new absolute word nonstop distance record.
- December 16 – Shareholders approve the merger of Delta Air Lines and Western Airlines, making Western a wholly owned subsidiary of Delta as an intermediary step along the way to a complete merger, which will be completed in April 1987.
- December 18 – George Younger, British Secretary of State for Defence, announces the cancellation of the AEW3 airborne early warning version of the Nimrod maritime patrol aircraft, with the American Boeing E-3 Sentry to be purchased instead.
- December 25 – Four men hijack Iraqi Airways Flight 163, a Boeing 737-270C with 106 people on board, during a flight from Baghdad, Iraq, to Amman, Jordan. Airline security personnel try to stop the hijacking, and during the struggle two of the hijackers' hand grenades explode; one of them detonates in the cockpit, causing the plane to crash near Arar, Saudi Arabia, killing 63 of those on board and making it one of the deadliest hijackings in history at the time. A group calling itself "Islamic Jihad," a widely used name for Hezbollah, claims responsibility.
- December 31 – During 1986, Iraq has made 57 air attacks against shipping in the Persian Gulf – one using bombs, four using rockets, and 52 using air-to-surface missiles – while Iran has conducted nine air attacks against Persian Gulf shipping. The total of Iraqi air attacks against Persian Gulf shipping since 1984 has reached 125 – two using bombs, four using rockets, and the rest using air-to-surface missiles – while Iran's total since 1984 has reached 37.

== First flights ==
- Fisher FP-606 Sky Baby

=== January ===
- January 3 - Elmwood Christavia Mk IV
- January 30 – Loehle 5151 Mustang

=== February ===
- February 15 – Beechcraft Starship

=== April ===
- April 25 – Air Tractor AT-503
- April 26 – Piasecki PA-97 Helistat, the largest dynamic lift aircraft in the world
- April 27 – Partenavia Mosquito

=== May ===
- May 19 - British Aerospace Hawk 200

=== July ===
- July 4 – Dassault Rafale A
- July 6 - Stemme S10
- July 18 - PZL M26 Iskierka

=== August ===
- August 6 – BAe ATP
- August 8 – British Aerospace EAP
- August 15 – Akaflieg Darmstadt D-40
- August 17 – Tsunami racing aircraft.

=== September ===
- September 23 – Piaggio P.180 Avanti

=== November ===
- November 17 – Mil Mi-34
- November 30 – Fokker 100

=== December ===
- December 8 – Beriev A-40 Albatros (NATO reporting name "Mermaid")
- December 31 – IAI Lavi

== Entered service ==
- Fisher FP-606 Sky Baby
- Early 1986 – Antonov An-124 Ruslan ("Condor") with Aeroflot

=== May ===
- Pioneer (later RQ-2 Pioneer) unmanned aerial vehicle with the United States Navy
- May 1 – Dassault Mirage IVP with the French Armée de l'Air

=== June ===
- Beechcraft Beechjet

=== October ===
- October 1 – AH-64 Apache with the United States Army 6th Cavalry Brigade

== Deadliest crash ==
The deadliest crash of this year was Mexicana de Aviación Flight 940, a Boeing 727 which crashed near Michoacán, Mexico, on 31 March, killing all 167 people on board.
