= Markham College =

- Colegio Markham
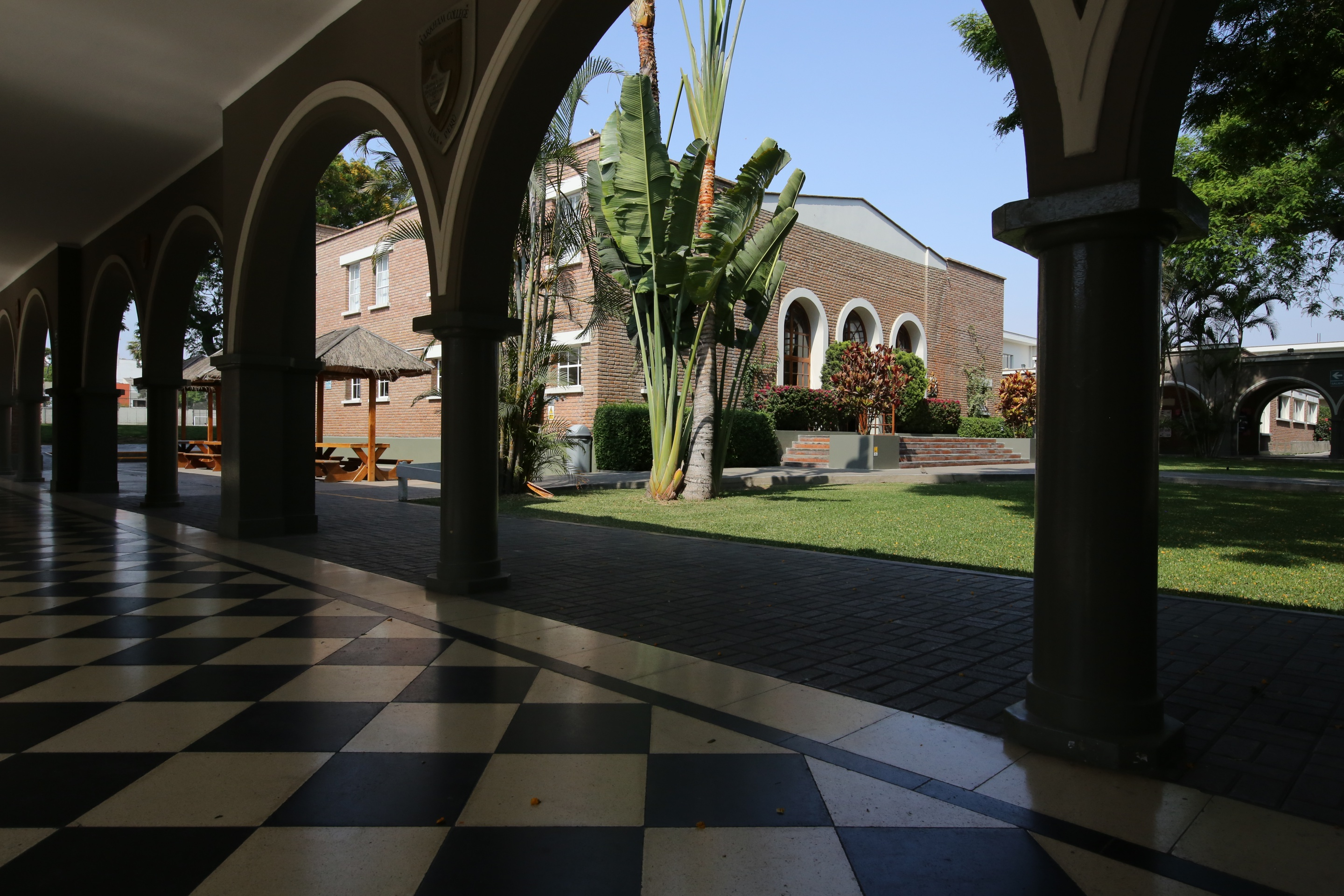

Location
- Calle Augusto Angulo 291; Miraflores, Lima; Peru; 12°07′30″S 77°00′59″W

Information
- Type: Private international school
- Motto: Latin: Studiis et rebus honestis (For honourable studies and pursuits)
- Religious affiliation: Nonsectarian
- Established: 1946
- Chairman of the Board of Governors: Gonzalo Aguirre Arriz
- Headmaster: Judy Cooper
- Grades: Nursery; Pre-Kindergarten; Kindergarten; Primary 1-6, Secondary 1-6
- Gender: Co-educational
- Enrollment: approx. 2 000
- Houses: Cochrane; Guise; Miller; Rowcroft
- Colors: Brown; Gold
- Yearbook: The Markhamian
- Affiliation: Round Square; G20 Schools Group; ADCA; UDCA; Latin American Heads Conference; International Baccalaureate Programme; University of Cambridge International Examinations; Duke of Edinburgh’s International Award; London College of Music (LCM)
- Primary language: English
- Website: www.markham.edu.pe

Markham College is a private, bilingual international school located in Lima, Peru. Founded by British immigrants in 1946, Markham promotes a mixture of British and Peruvian education. As of 2026, the school had approximately 2 000 students enrolled, between the ages of 3 to 18.

The school has 3 different campuses located in Miraflores and Santiago de Surco in Lima. In May 2024, a new primary school campus was opened in the Monterrico district of Santiago de Surco in Lima.

== History ==
The school was named after the British historian and explorer Sir Clements Robert Markham (1838–1916).

The first student, Rafael Peschiera entered Markham College in March 1946. By 1978, it had grown to about 1,200 students and it was necessary to acquire a second site. The transfer of the Lower School to this site began in 1979.

After 46 years as a single sex boys school, in 1992, the school became co-educational with girls being admitted.

In 2004, the school became part of Round Square, an internationally recognised organisation of schools which follows the ideals of Kurt Hahn, and Markhamian delegations have attended Round Square conferences both regionally and globally ever since. The school is also a member of the G20 Schools Group.

== Curriculum ==
Students fulfil the Peruvian national curriculum as well as the IGCSE (International General Certificate of Secondary Education) programme from the University of Cambridge. Many students subsequently enroll in the International Baccalaureate Diploma Programme.

Classes are mostly taught in English, with a small number of courses taught in Spanish. The study of French is compulsory from P6 to S1, becoming optional from S2 onwards.

At IGCSE level, for courses at secondary three and four, Markham offers classes in Additional Mathematics, Art & Design, Business Studies, Computer Studies, Co-ordinated (double) Science, Design and Technology (three options), Drama, First Language English, Food and Nutrition, French, Geography, History, Information Technology, Literature in both English and Spanish, Mathematics, Music, Physical Education and First and Foreign Language Spanish.

At IB Diploma level, Further Mathematics, Biology, Chemistry, Computer Science, Design Technology, Economics, English A and B, Film Studies, French B, Geography, Global Politics, History, Mathematics, Music, Physics, Psychology, Spanish A and B, Sports, Exercise and Health Science, Theatre Arts and Visual Arts are currently all being taught at Higher Level. In addition to those, Environmental Systems is also available at Standard Level.

All students are entered for University of Cambridge ESOL (PET) Preliminary English Test in their final year of Primary education and for the (FCE) First Certificate of English examination at the age of 14. Secondary 5 students who choose to follow the National Programme are entered for the Certificate of Advanced English (CAE).

== Sports and extracurricular activities ==
Apart from the academic curriculum, the school offers a variety of extra-curricular activities. These include several art courses, drama, music, sports such as football, hockey, cricket and rugby and many other activities such as Model United Nations or debating.

== Notable alumni ==
=== Sports ===
- Stefano Peschiera - bronze medal winner in sailing at the 2024 Summer Olympics
- Alfredo Tomassini - notable football player
- Felipe Pomar Rospigliosi - First ISF-ISA World Surfing Champion
- Richard Sinclair Jones Monteverde - notable sailing world champion
- Ramón Ferreyros Pomar - notable rally driver.

=== Arts and media ===
- Jaime Bayly Letts - writer, journalist & television personality
- Gonzalo Torres- notable actor, comedian, television personality and radio host
- César Alfredo Miro Quesada Bahamonde - notable novelist and writer
- Luis Llosa - notable film director and producer
- Josué Méndez - notable film director
- Diego Bertie Brignardello - contemporary actor
- Alonso Alegría Amézquita - notable playwright and theatre actor
- Javier Heraud Pérez - notable poet and guerrilla leader

=== Politics ===
- Pedro Pablo Kuczynski Godard - former President of Peru
- José Luis Silva Martinot - former Minister of Foreign Commerce and Tourism.
- Miguel Castilla Rubio - former Minister of Economy & Finance and current Peru ambassador to the US
- Juan Carlos Gamarra Skeels - diplomat and ambassador of Peru to the Holy Seat
- Javier Bedoya Denegri - deputy mayor of the San Isidro district.

=== Business ===
- Alex Fort Brescia - businessman and chairman of Grupo Brescia
- Richard Webb Duarte - former President of the Central Reserve Bank of Peru.

== In popular culture ==
- In a number of Jaime Bayly's novels, including Yo amo a mi mami and No se lo digas a nadie, the main characters (based on Bayly's experience in the school) attend Markham College.
- Julius, the main character in Alfredo Bryce's novel A World for Julius, enrolls in Markham College after his mother decides to switch him to a British-style school.
