= AEA Explorer =

Explorer
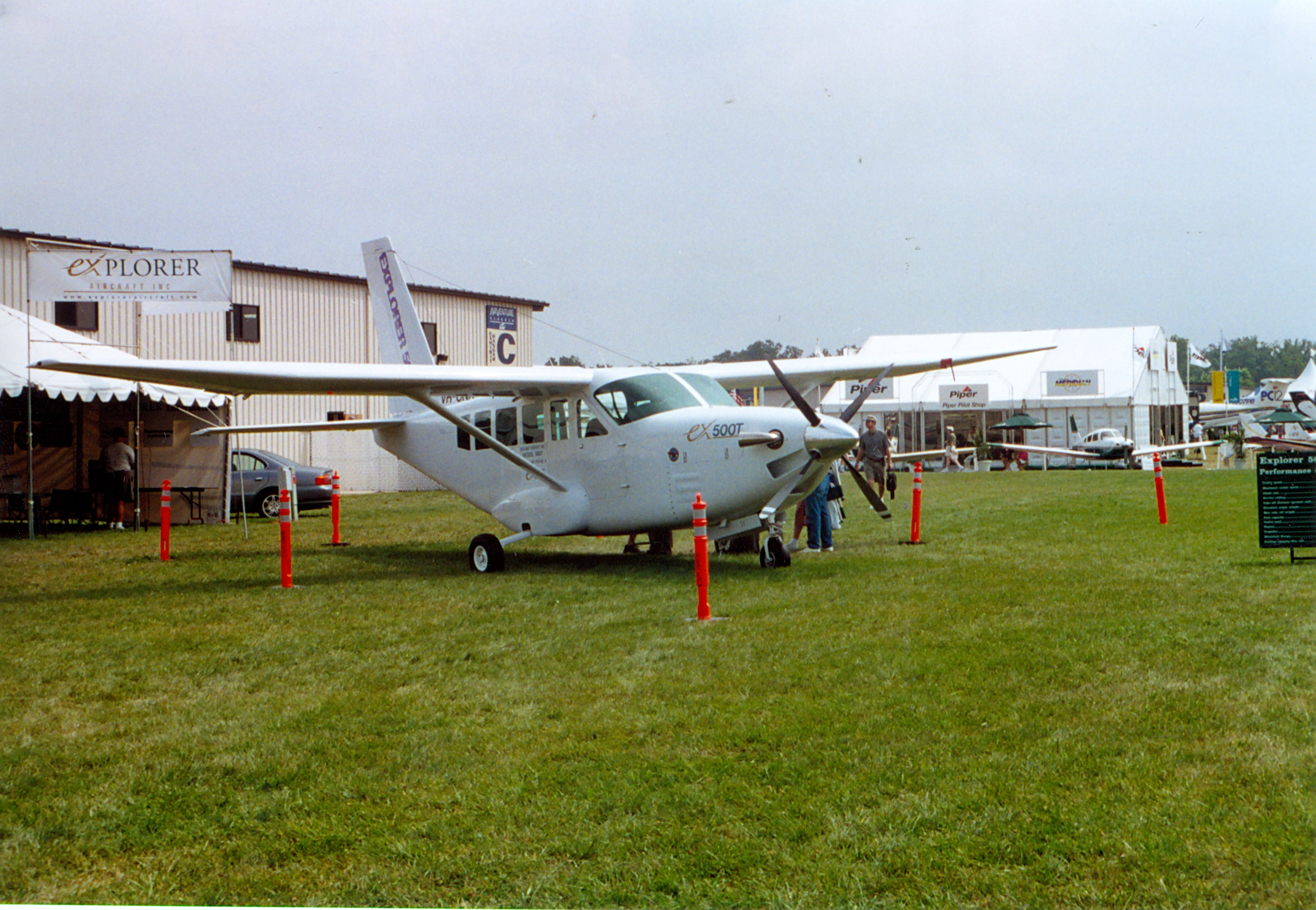

General information
- Type: Light Multirole
- National origin: Australia
- Manufacturer: Aero Engineers Australia (AEA)

History
- First flight: 23 January 1998

The AEA Explorer (sometimes called the Explorer Explorer) is a large single-engine utility aircraft.

== Design and development ==
The explorer is a single-engined strut-braced high-wing monoplane with a retractable tricycle landing gear that retracts into under-fuselage sponsons. The prototype, designated Explorer 350R first flew in 1998 and was soon exhibited on promotional tours of Australia and the United States.

The Explorer is currently being offered in two versions – the turboprop-powered version, the 500T (which first flew in 2000), and a stretched version of the 500T, designated 750T.

Explorer Aircraft was established in Jasper, Texas to market the aircraft for the US market.

== Specifications AEA 500T ==
Data from Jane's All The World's Aircraft 2003–2004

General characteristics

- Crew: 1
- Capacity: 9 passengers
- Length: 9.68 m (31 ft 9 in)
- Wingspan: 14.43 m (47 ft 4 in)
- Height: 4.72 m (15 ft 6 in)
- Wing area: 18.36 m^{2} (197.6 sq ft)
- Aspect ratio: 11.3:1
- Empty weight: 1,724 kg (3,800 lb)
- Max takeoff weight: 2,812 kg (6,200 lb)
- Fuel capacity: 277 US Gallons (1,049 L)
- Powerplant: 1 × Pratt & Whitney Canada PT6A-135B turboprop, 450 kW (600 shp)
- Propellers: 4-bladed Hartzell D9511FK-2

Performance

- Maximum speed: 380 km/h (236 mph, 205 kn)
- Cruise speed: 333 km/h (207 mph, 180 kn)
- Stall speed: 114 km/h (71 mph, 62 kn)
- Range: 1,759 km (1,093 mi, 950 nmi)
- Service ceiling: 7,620 m (25,000 ft)
- Rate of climb: 5.1 m/s (1,000 ft/min)

== See also ==
Aircraft of comparable role, configuration, and era

- Cessna Caravan
- Gippsland GA8
- Pacific Aerospace 750XL
