= Pearl Aviation =

Australian aviation company

Aeropearl
IATA	ICAO	Call sign
—	ADA	AUSCAL
- Founded: 1997
- Hubs: Brisbane Airport
- Fleet size: 2 Beechcraft King Air
- Parent company: Paspaley Pearling
- Headquarters: Darwin, Northern Territory

Pearl Aviation is an Australian aviation company that operates charter (some in support of the mining industry) navigational aid flight inspection services, flight centres and ground handling. It is part of the Paspaley Group. Its main base and flight centre is Darwin International Airport.

== History ==
Paspaley Aviation
IATA	ICAO	Call sign
—	—	PEARLING
- Hubs: Darwin Airport
- Fleet size: 3 Grumman G-73
- Parent company: Paspaley Pearling
- Headquarters: Darwin, Northern Territory

The airline was formed and started operations in 1964. It was acquired by Ansett Airlines in 1987. The company was divided into airline and non-airline operations and the non-airline operations were purchased in 1996 by Paspaley Pearling (which by that time had been operating aircraft to its pearl farms for over ten years) and renamed. One of the divisions of east–west that was purchased was an operation at Sydney Airport, conducting air ambulance flights for the Ambulance Service of New South Wales. In 2004 Pearl Aviation was awarded a ten-year contract to operate four Beechcraft Super King Airs configured as air ambulances for the Northern Territory Aerial Medical Service, after losing a similar Ambulance Service of New South Wales contract to the Royal Flying Doctor Service the previous year. In 2010 the Northern Territory Aerial Medical Service terminated the contract with Pearl Aviation.

AeroPearl is a joint venture between Pearl Aviation and Aerodata AG of Germany, based at Brisbane Airport. It operates under contract to Airservices Australia; it uses two Beechcraft Super King Airs to check the network of Australian civil aviation navaids, and has also performed similar work in various Asian countries.

== Fleet ==
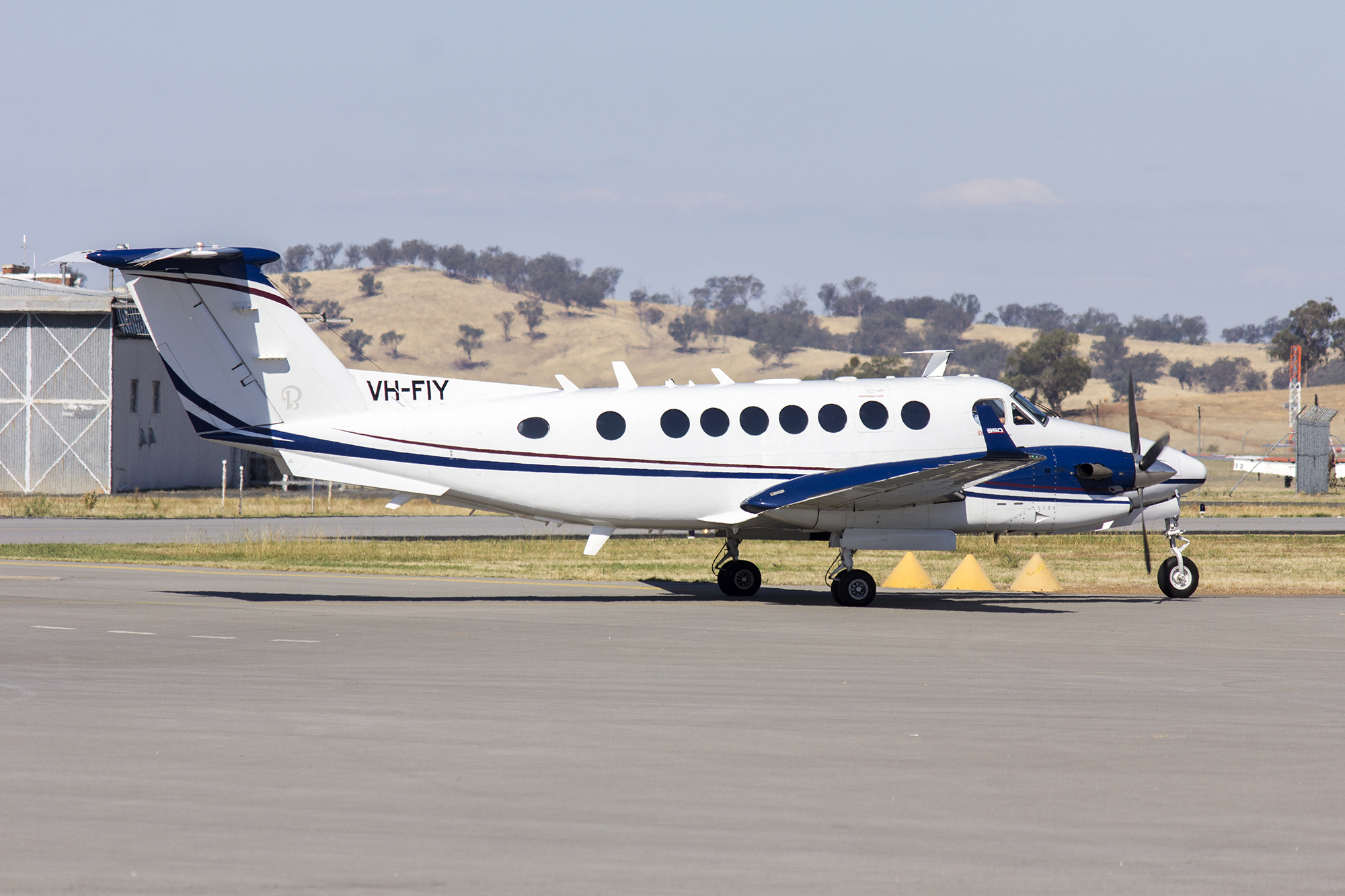
Super King Air 350 VH-FIY

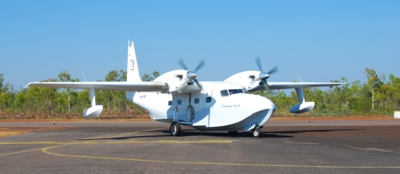
Grumman G-73AT turbine Mallard at Truscott Mungalalu

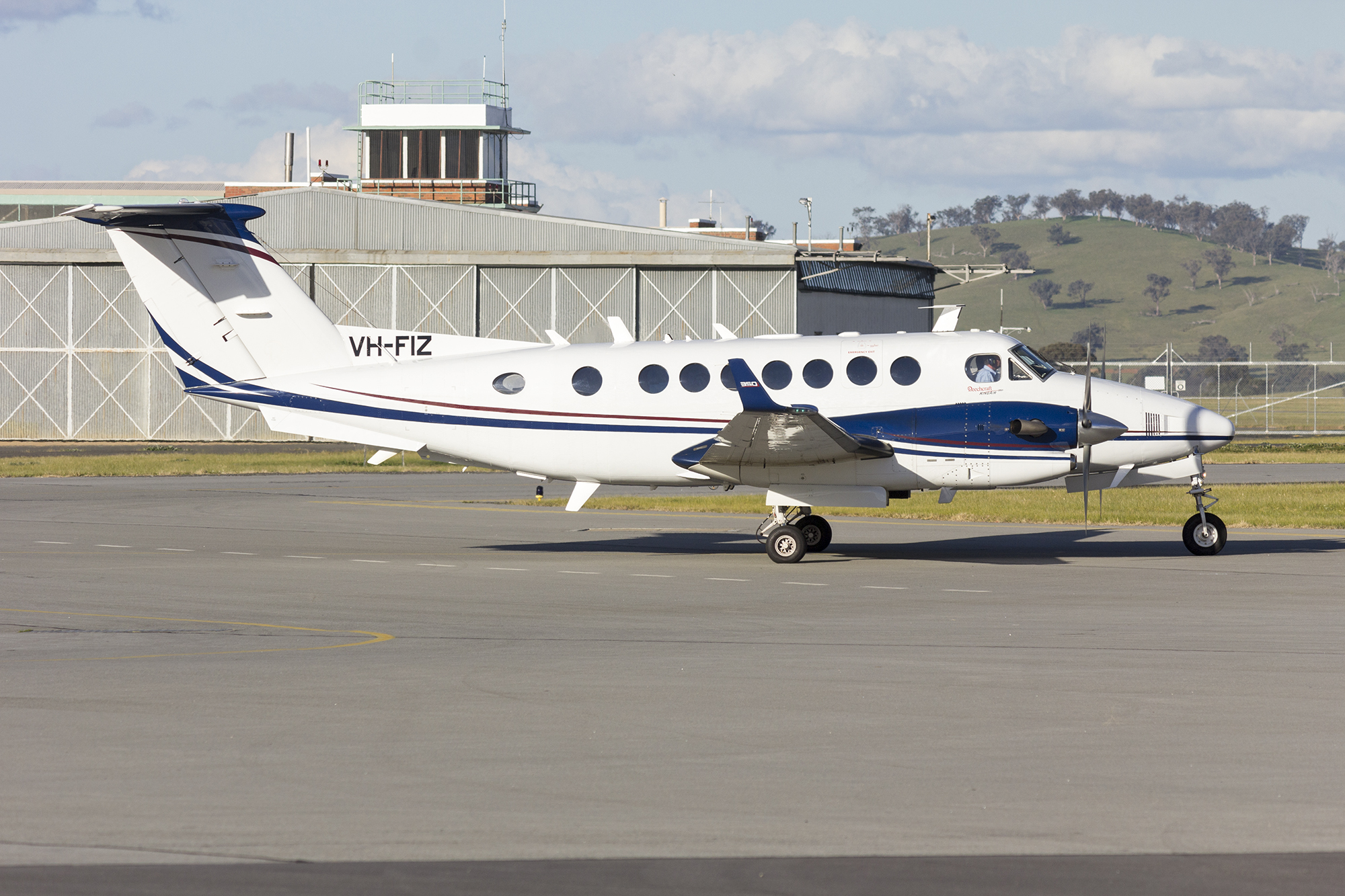
Super King Air 350 VH-FIZ

=== Current Fleet ===
As of November 2026 the Pearl Aviation Fleet includes:

- 2 Beechcraft Super King Air (Aeropearl)
  - VH-FIY
  - VH-FIZ
- 3 Grumman Mallard (Paspaley Aviation)
  - VH-PPE
  - VH-PPI
  - VH-PPT

=== Former fleet ===
As of November 2021 the Pearl Aviation fleet includes:

- 2 Beechcraft Super King Air
- Dornier 328
- 3 Grumman Mallard
- Dassault Falcon 900

The Dornier 328 aircraft were operated from four separate bases in Australia on a ten-year contract for the Australian Maritime Safety Authority (AMSA). Some 120 staff are involved in providing the service.

The Grumman Mallard aircraft are operated in support of the Paspaley Pearling Company's ship fleet.

In 2016 Pearl Aviation scaled back its charter services from Darwin due to reduced demand from the mining sector. At that time its fleet included the following aircraft:

- 11 Beechcraft Super King Air
- 4 Fairchild Metroliner
- 3 Cessna Citation II
- 1 IAI Westwind

At December 2009 the Pearl Aviation fleet consisted of:

- 3 Beechcraft B300 Super King Air 350

== See also ==
- List of airlines of Australia
