= Marun-e Jayezan =

Marun-e Jayezan مارون جايزان
- Village
- Location within Iran
- Coordinates: 30°51′17″N 49°50′11″E
- Country: Iran
- Province: Khuzestan
- County: Omidiyeh
- Bakhsh: Jayezan
- Rural District: Jayezan

Population (2006)
  - Total: 148
- Time zone: UTC+3:30 (IRST)
  - Summer (DST): UTC+4:30 (IRDT)

Marun-e Jayezan (Persian: مارون جايزان, also Romanized as Mārūn-e Jāyezān and Mārūn-e Jāyzān; also known as Mārūn) is a village in Jayezan Rural District, Jayezan District, Omidiyeh County, Khuzestan Province, Iran. At the 2006 census, its population was 148, in 31 families.
