= Cornelius Cook =

American baseball player

- Pitcher
- Born: September 20, 1909; Vincennes, Indiana, U.S.
- Died: December 19, 1987 (aged 78); Bloomington, Indiana, U.S.
- Threw: Left

Negro league baseball debut
- 1937, for the Indianapolis Athletics

Last appearance
- 1937, for the Indianapolis Athletics

Teams
- Indianapolis Athletics (1937)

Robert Cornelius Cook (September 20, 1909 – December 19, 1987) was an American Negro league pitcher in the 1930s.

A native of Vincennes, Indiana, Cook attended Bloomington High School in Bloomington, Indiana, where he played football and baseball. He played for the Indianapolis Athletics in 1937, and was inducted into the Monroe County Sports Hall of Fame in 2011. Cook died in Bloomington in 1987 at age 78.
