= J. A. Baker =

English author

John Alec Baker
- Born: 6 August 1926; Chelmsford, Essex, UK
- Died: 26 December 1987 (aged 61); Chelmsford, Essex, UK
- Occupation: Author

John Alec Baker (6 August 1926 – 26 December 1987) was an English author, best known for The Peregrine, which won the Duff Cooper Prize in 1967.

== Biography ==
Baker was born on 6 August 1926, the only son of engineering draughtsman Wilfred Baker and his wife Pansy, and lived all his life in Chelmsford, Essex, in eastern England. His secondary education was at King Edward VI Grammar School, Chelmsford. He was short-sighted, and in childhood was often absent from school with ill health, including rheumatic fever.

After several jobs in his early adulthood, he became the manager of the Chelmsford branch of The Automobile Association (AA) and later the manager of a Britvic depot.

On 6 October 1956 he married Doreen Grace Coe (1935–2006), a wages clerk at the AA. They had no children.

He read widely, and wrote both prose and poetry. His books are based largely on his observations of birds in the Essex countryside, especially in the area from Chelmsford to the coast, which he recorded in diaries from 1954 to 1963. There is no evidence that he took notes in the field; he wrote up what he had seen on returning home.

He was unable to drive, despite working for the AA, and travelled by bicycle. In later life he was progressively crippled by severe ankylosing spondylitis, a type of arthritis. From around 1970 his arthritis became increasingly severe, and by the 1980s he had to be driven to his favourite haunts by Doreen. He contracted cancer, likely as a result of drugs that alleviated his arthritis symptoms, and died on 26 December 1987.

== The Peregrine ==
Robert Macfarlane deemed The Peregrine "a masterpiece of twentieth-century non-fiction" in his introduction to the New York Review Books edition of the book. On the back jacket cover of the same edition, James Dickey states that the book "transcends any 'nature writing' of our time", while Barry Lopez declares the book "one of the most beautifully written, carefully observed and evocative wildlife accounts I have ever read". Werner Herzog called it the "one book I would ask you to read if you want to make films", and said elsewhere "... it has prose of the caliber that we have not seen since Joseph Conrad."

Baker appears to have destroyed many of his daily notes and, for The Peregrine, condensed observations from the years 1955 to 1965 into a single seven-month period from October to April, probably intended as 1962–63 to include the winter known as the Big Freeze. The book describes the author's ten-year obsession with the peregrines that wintered near his home in Chelmsford. The writing is lyrically charged throughout, as the author's role of diligent observer gives way to a personal transformation, as Baker becomes, in the words of James Dickey on the book's jacket cover, "a fusion of man and bird".

In January 2018, The Peregrine was included by the Arts and Humanities Research Council in a list of ten contenders to find the UK's favourite book about nature. (Note: When the result was announced at the end of January on the BBC Winterwatch programme The Peregrine did not make the top three. The poll was topped by Fingers in the Sparkle Jar by Chris Packham.)

Over the years, there has been much debate over the veracity of Baker's observations of the behaviour of peregrines. Conor Mark Jameson has suggested in his book Silent Spring Revisited (2012) and blog that their behaviour as recorded by Baker, which would certainly be aberrant, may really have happened if their nervous systems were damaged by poison.

The BBC broadcast a recording of The Peregrine read by David Attenborough in December 2019. It was available for a year at the BBC Radio 4 website.

== Other works and legacy ==
Baker's only other book is The Hill of Summer (1969), a lyrical and somewhat visionary account of summer's progress across the wilder parts of southern England. Though not as famous as The Peregrine, it enjoys much the same reputation for literary beauty and naturalist precision.

In 2011, Collins published a single-volume edition of his works, including The Peregrine, The Hill of Summer, and extracts from his diaries. It includes an introduction by Mark Cocker and notes by John Fanshawe, and provides information about Baker's personal life that had not previously been available.

In 2017, Collins published a 50th anniversary edition of The Peregrine with an introduction by Mark Cocker, notes by John Fanshawe, a new afterword by Robert Macfarlane, and Baker's article On the Essex Coast, first published in RSPB Birds magazine in 1971.

Chelmsford City Council has put a Blue Plaque at the entrance to the block of flats in Stansted Close, Chelmsford, where Baker lived when writing The Peregrine. The full citation and a biography of Baker is on the council's website.

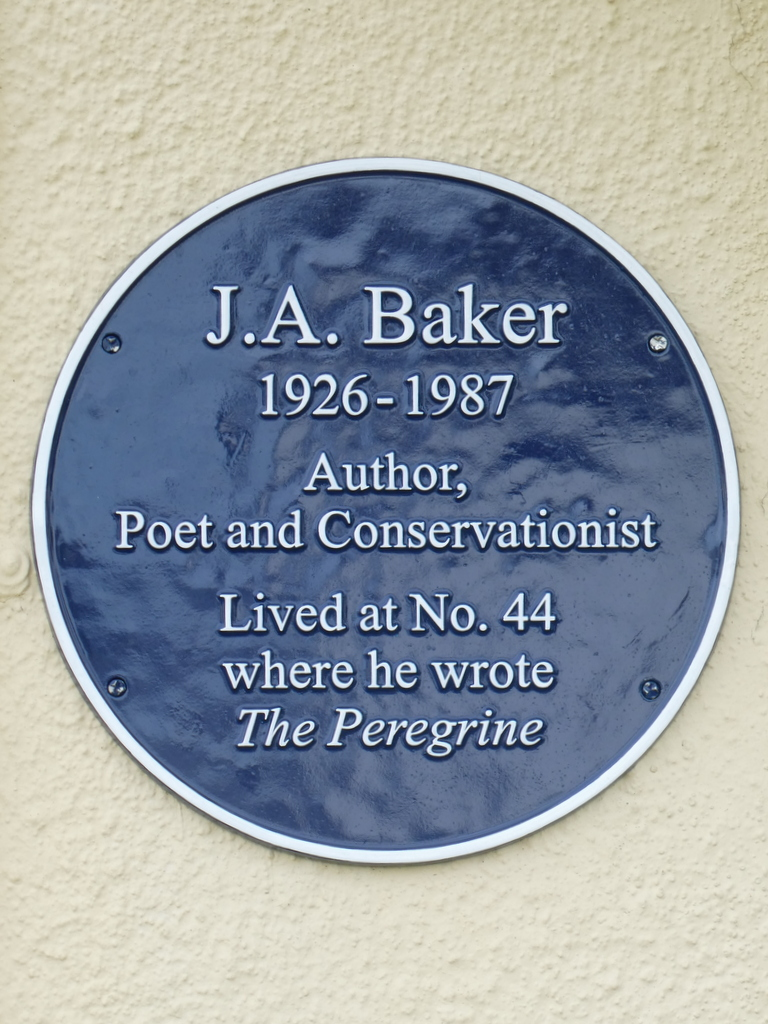
Chelmsford City Council Blue Plaque for J. A. Baker (erected February 2020)

Further recognition of Baker's importance to Chelmsford came with the announcement in November 2023 of an exhibition in Chelmsford Museum on his life and work. This ran from 23 March 2024 to 23 February 2025. More information about the exhibition is in another Chelmsford City Council press release dated 18 March 2024, and a blog by co-curator Sarah Harvey dated 7 October 2024 gives the background to the exhibition.

The University of Essex holds items associated with Baker, including his diaries, drafts of his books, corrected proofs, correspondence, and optical equipment he used when birdwatching. (Note: Miranda 10x50 binoculars and J.H. Steward 60x spotter scope.) The archive was catalogued in 2016 by Hetty Saunders and is now open to all those interested in Baker's life and work.

In October 2017, Little Toller Books published the first biography of Baker, My House of Sky: The life of J.A. Baker by Hetty Saunders. In addition to the biography, the book includes a preface by Robert Macfarlane, a selection of Baker's poetry, an article by John Fanshawe about the J. A. Baker Archive with photographs of some of the items, and a section with photographs of "Baker Country" taken by Christopher Matthews.
