= Joe Gray Taylor =

American historian and writer

- Born: February 14, 1920; Tipton County, Tennessee, U.S.
- Died: December 8, 1987 (aged 67); Lake Charles, Louisiana, U.S.
- Education: Memphis State University; Louisiana State University
- Occupations: Historian, writer

Joe Gray Taylor (February 14, 1920 – December 8, 1987) was an American historian and writer.

== Life and career ==
Taylor was born in Tipton County, Tennessee, the son of Bassil Gray Taylor, a carpenter and farmer, and Lennie Fee Shinault, a schoolmarm. He served in the armed forces during World War II. After his discharge, he attended Memphis State University, earning his BS degree in 1947 and his MA degree in 1948. He also attended Louisiana State University, earning his PhD degree in 1951, which after earning his degrees, he taught at Nicholls State College until 1953 and again from 1958 to 1963.

Taylor served as a professor in the department of history at McNeese State University from 1963 to 1987. During his years as a professor, in 1967, he served as president of the Louisiana Historical Association, and he wrote the books Negro Slavery in Louisiana, Louisiana Reconstructed, 1863-1877, Louisiana: A Bicentennial History, and Eating, Drinking, and Visiting in the South.

== Death ==
Taylor died on December 8, 1987, in Lake Charles, Louisiana, at the age of 67.
