= Alfredo Tomassini =

Peruvian footballer (1964–1987)

Alfredo Tomasini
Personal information
- Full name: Alfredo Tomasini Aita
- Date of birth: 24 June 1964
- Date of death: 8 December 1987 (aged 23)
- Position: Striker

Senior career*
Years	Team	Apps	(Gls)
1986–1987	Sporting Cristal		
1987	Alianza Lima		
- * Club domestic league appearances and goals

Alfredo Tomasini (24 June 1964 – 8 December 1987) was a Peruvian football player.

Nicknamed el Tanque Blanco, Tomasini was a forward for the club Sporting Cristal between 1985 and 1986 and Alianza Lima, until 1987 when he died in an airplane crash known as the 1987 Alianza Lima air disaster. He survived the initial crash but due to a broken leg was not able to stay afloat. His body was never recovered.

Tomasini was also an expert swimmer graduated from the British Markham College.
