= José González Ganoza =

Peruvian footballer (1954–1987)

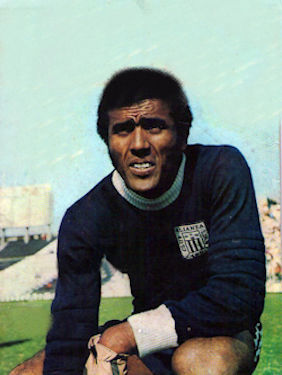
- González Ganoza in the mid-1970s

Personal information
- Full name: José Manuel González Ganoza
- Date of birth: 10 July 1954
- Place of birth: Peru
- Date of death: 8 December 1987 (aged 33)
- Place of death: Ventanilla District, Peru
- Position: Goalkeeper

Senior career*
Years	Team	Apps	(Gls)
1974–1987	Alianza Lima	?	(?)

International career
1981–1987	Peru	20	(0)
- * Club domestic league appearances and goals

José Manuel González Ganoza (10 July 1954 – 8 December 1987), sometimes known as Caíco, was a Peruvian international footballer who played as a goalkeeper.

González Ganoza was among the victims of the 1987 Alianza Lima air disaster.

His nephew, Paolo Guerrero, is also a football player, who is the Peru national team's all-time leading goalscorer.
