= Luis Antonio Escobar (footballer) =

Peruvian footballer (1969-1987)

Personal information
- Date of birth: 19 September 1969
- Place of birth: Peru
- Date of death: 8 December 1987 (aged 18)
- Place of death: Ventanilla District, Peru
- Position: Striker

Senior career*
Years	Team	Apps	(Gls)
1984–1987	Alianza Lima	?	(?)

International career
1985	Peru	1	(0)
- * Club domestic league appearances and goals

Luis Antonio Escobar (19 September 1969 – 8 December 1987) was a Peruvian international footballer who played as a striker.

Escobar died in the 1987 Alianza Lima air disaster.
