= 1987 Alianza Lima plane crash =

1987 aviation accident

1987 Alianza Lima air disaster
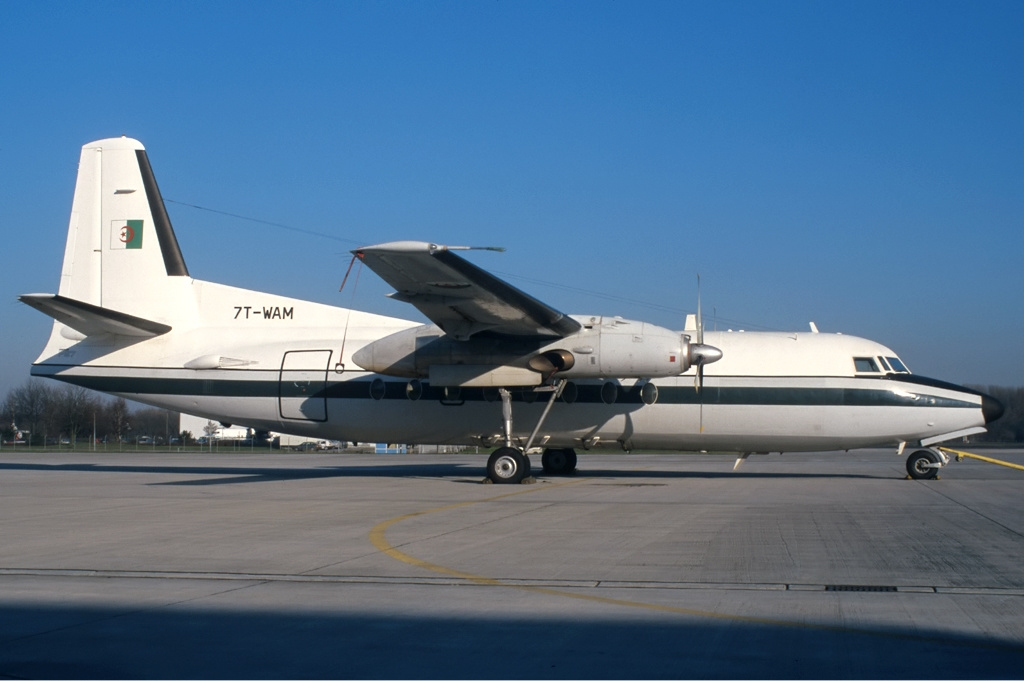
- A Fokker F27-400M, the aircraft type involved in the accident

Accident
- Date: 8 December 1987
- Summary: Pilot error
- Site: Ventanilla District, Peru; 11.967°S 77.160°W

Aircraft
- Aircraft type: Fokker F27
- Operator: Servicio Aeronaval de la Marina del Peru (charter)
- Registration: AE-560
- Flight origin: FAP Captain David Abenzur Rengifo International Airport
- Destination: Jorge Chávez International Airport
- Occupants: 43
- Passengers: 37
- Crew: 6
- Fatalities: 42
- Survivors: 1

The 1987 Alianza Lima air disaster occurred on 8 December 1987, when a Peruvian Navy Fokker F27-400M chartered by Peruvian football club Alianza Lima crashed into the Pacific Ocean seven miles from Jorge Chávez International Airport near the city of Callao. Of the 43 people on board, only the pilot survived.

The Peruvian Naval Aviation Commission investigated the accident and created a report but never officially disclosed its content. Eventually, the Navy's accident report was discovered and details of it were released. In the report, investigators cited pilot error as the primary cause of the accident.

== Accident ==
Alianza was scheduled to play a football match against Deportivo Pucallpa in the Amazonionan city of Pucallpa and had organized a charter aircraft, a Folker F-27, charted by the Air Services branch of the Peruvian Navy for the trip to Pucallpa and back. Alianza Lima won the game 1–0 to take them top of the table and were in control of the table with only a few games remaining; the team hadn't won the title since 1978 while their biggest rivals Universario and Sporting Cristal had each won 5 titles since. Therefore the team was elated, and despite the pilot in command having reservations about the plane's condition, the aircraft departed Pucallpa at 6:30 p.m. On board were Peruvian Navy Lieutenant Edilberto Villar as pilot, César Morales as copilot, 4 cabin crewmembers, 16 players, coach Marcos Calderón, 12 team staff, and 8 cheerleaders. The total of 43 occupants was officially revised down from preliminary reports of 44 after the crash.

The flight was uneventful until the crew began their descent into Lima. Upon lowering the landing gear, the left and right main gear displayed green lights, indicating down and locked, but the nose gear did not. Villar requested that Morales consult the flight manual for the proper procedure to follow. The manual was written in English and because Morales's foreign language skill was poor he read out the wrong procedure. The crew requested a fly-by of the control tower so that observers could confirm that the nose gear was down. Using binoculars the observers confirmed that the airplane was configured for landing and the crew brought the aircraft around for another attempt at a landing. While over water the aircraft flew too low and the right wing struck the surface of the ocean as the aircraft was lining up with the runway, 11.1 km (6.9 mi) northwest of the airport. The airliner broke up on impact and the forward fuselage sank.

== Aircraft ==
The aircraft involved was a Fokker F27-400M Friendship, registration AE-560. The airliner, with serial number 10548, had first flown in 1977 and had logged a total of 5,908 hours.

== Passengers ==
Alianza lost the majority of its team as a result of the accident. Notable passengers on the flight included:

Players

- José Casanova
- Luis Escobar
- José González Ganoza
- Alfredo Tomassini
- Johnny Watson

Coach

- Marcos Calderón

== Aftermath ==
The pilot and sole survivor Villar was able to exit the aircraft from a hole in the fuselage and ascend to the surface where he was joined by footballer Alfredo Tomasini. Villar was able to trap air in some clothing to use as a flotation device. Tomasini was suffering from a broken leg and other injuries. The pilot and athlete floated together for hours but near sunrise the two became separated in the choppy waters and Tomasini drowned. Shortly after dawn, search and rescue teams discovered the aircraft tail section floating and rescued Villar after more than 11 hours in the water.

The accident was announced to a stunned community and over the next several days some bodies were recovered from the sea.

== Investigation ==
Following the crash, the Peruvian Navy refused to comment on the cause of the accident. The Peruvian Naval Aviation Commission allowed no private investigations to take place and began its own investigation. An accident report was made but not released to the public. As of 2025, it is still not available online.

In 2006, producers working on a story for the Peruvian television program La Ventana Indiscreta uncovered the Navy report, which had been illegally locked in a Florida deposit box for 18 years. The investigation cited the pilot's lack of night-flying experience, the co-pilot's misinterpretation of the emergency procedures for the landing gear issue, and the aircraft's poor mechanical condition as contributing factors to the accident.

According to the report, dated February 1988, Lieutenant Villar had logged just 5.3 hours of night flying in the 90 days preceding the accident, 3.3 of them in the previous 60 days, and had not flown at night in at least 30 days before the crash. The copilot, First Lieutenant César Morales, had logged only one hour of night flying in the 90 days preceding the accident, half an hour in the preceding 60 days, and had also not flown at night in at least 30 days. Additionally, the F27's maintenance log, which was handed to the pilot before takeoff, showed a series of mechanical defects including lacking an inertial guidance system, poor UHF radio performance, a VOR receiving unit with inadequate reception, a malfunctioning radar altimeter and a worn front landing gear indicator light switch. Lieutenant Villar initially refused to fly the aircraft due to concerns about its condition.

In a letter from the Fokker aircraft company, dated October 16, 1986, the manufacturer noted that Lieutenant Villar had failed a special training course which could have prevented "his disorientation while operating under pressure, the excessive demand of work in a cabin", but was granted permission to fly the aircraft regardless. Copilot César Morales had received no flight training from Fokker.

A year and a half before, on 29 April 1986, another Peruvian Navy F-27 400M (reg. AE-561) crashed in the Pacific off the coast of Huacho, killing its seven occupants: two naval captains, two lieutenants and three lower-ranking naval officers. It is unknown whether this accident's causes could have been related to the later loss of the Alianza Lima aircraft. AE-561 was the sister ship to F27 AE-560.

== See also ==
- List of accidents involving sports teams
