= Johnny Watson (footballer) =

Peruvian footballer (1963-1987)

Personal information
- Full name: Johnny Watson Navarro
- Date of birth: 1963
- Place of birth: La Victoria, Peru
- Date of death: 8 December 1987 (aged 24)
- Place of death: Ventanilla District, Peru

Senior career*
Years	Team	Apps	(Gls)
1982–1985	Sport Boys		
1986–1987	Alianza Lima		
- * Club domestic league appearances and goals

Johnny Watson Navarro (1963 – 8 December 1987) was a Peruvian professional footballer who played for Sport Boys and Alianza Lima.

Watson died in the 1987 Alianza Lima air disaster.
