= José Casanova (footballer) =

Peruvian footballer (1964–1987)

Personal information
- Full name: José Casanova Mendoza
- Date of birth: 12 May 1964
- Place of birth: Peru
- Date of death: 8 December 1987 (aged 23)
- Place of death: Ventanilla District, Peru
- Position: Midfielder

Senior career*
Years	Team	Apps	(Gls)
1983–1987	Alianza Lima		

International career
1983–1985	Peru	10	(1)
- * Club domestic league appearances and goals

José Casanova Mendoza (12 May 1964 – 8 December 1987) was a Peruvian international footballer who played as a midfielder. He was also part of Peru's squad for the 1983 Copa América tournament.

Casanova died in the 1987 Alianza Lima air disaster.
