= Dayton Flyers =

Intercollegiate athletic teams of the University of Dayton in Ohio, U.S.

- University: University of Dayton
- Conference: Atlantic 10 (primary); Pioneer Football League; MAAC (women's golf)
- NCAA: Division I (FCS)
- Athletic director: Neil Sullivan
- Location: Dayton, Ohio
- Varsity teams: 16
- Football stadium: Welcome Stadium
- Basketball arena: UD Arena
- Baseball stadium: Woerner Field
- Soccer stadium: Baujan Field
- Mascot: Rudy Flyer
- Nickname: Flyers
- Fight song: Victory
- Colors: Red and blue
- Website: daytonflyers.com

The Dayton Flyers are the intercollegiate athletic teams of the University of Dayton of Dayton, Ohio. All Flyers intercollegiate sports teams participate at the NCAA Division I level. The football team competes in the Division I FCS non-scholarship Pioneer Football League, and women's golf plays in the Metro Atlantic Athletic Conference, while all other sports compete in the non-football Atlantic 10 Conference.

== The Flyers name ==
The name is a reference and homage to Daytonians Orville and Wilbur Wright who pioneered heavier than air flight. Orville and Wilbur Wright designed the Wright Flyer I and fabricated many of its components, including the propellers and engine, at their bicycle shop in Dayton. The Wright Flyer I was the first powered aircraft to achieve sustained, controlled flight.

== Teams ==
Men's sports	Women's sports
Baseball	Basketball
Basketball	Cross country
Cross country	Golf
Football	Rowing
Golf	Soccer
Soccer	Softball
Tennis	Tennis
	Track and field ^{†}
	Volleyball
† – Track and field includes both indoor and outdoor

A member of the Atlantic 10 Conference, the University of Dayton sponsors teams in seven men's and ten women's NCAA sanctioned sports. The football team competes as a member of the Pioneer Football League, a non-scholarship Division I (FCS) league. The women's golf team competes as an associate member of the Metro Atlantic Athletic Conference.

== Fan support ==
Atlantic 10 Conference logo in Dayton's colors

University of Dayton athletic teams enjoy considerable support from the fan base. The men's basketball team is perennially among the top 25 programs nationally in attendance. The student fan base is known as the "Red Scare" and provides support for the Flyers from behind the east goal during basketball games at UD Arena.

== Rivalries ==
The Flyers' traditional rivals in most sports are regional schools such as Xavier, Cincinnati, and Miami University. Dayton and Xavier vie for possession of the Blackburn/McCafferty Trophy during regular season men's basketball games. Other historical rivals of note include Butler University, Duquesne University, Temple University, University of Detroit, Marquette University, DePaul University, and the University of Notre Dame. The latter three schools formed an informal basketball league with Dayton during the 1970s and 1980s, prior to formal league association for each school. The Gem City Jam, an annual game with crosstown rival Wright State University, is currently suspended.

On an ESPN all-time ranking of NCAA basketball programs the University of Dayton placed No. 48 overall. Dayton recently won the 2010 NIT championship. In March 2014, Dayton upset state-favorite Ohio State, and the #3 seed Syracuse Orange in the NCAA Tournament with close victories. The Flyers then beat Stanford to reach the Elite Eight where they played the overall #1 seed Florida. They lost 62–52.

== Football ==
=== Bowl games ===
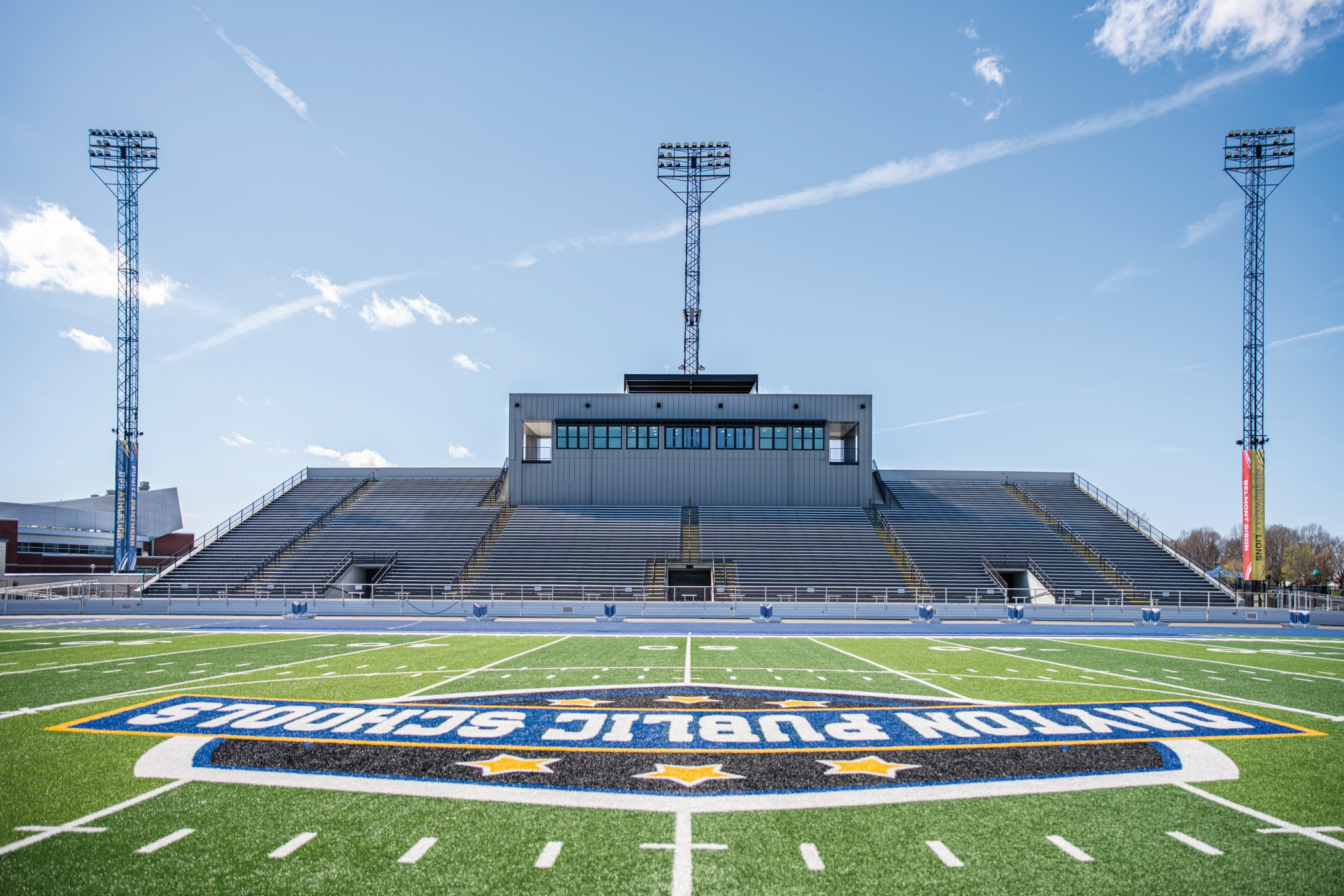
Welcome Stadium, Dayton's venue

Season	Bowl	Champion		Runner-up	
1951	Salad Bowl	Houston	28	Dayton	21
1980	Stagg Bowl	Dayton	63	Ithaca	0
1981	Stagg Bowl	Widener	17	Dayton	10
1987	Stagg Bowl	Wagner	19	Dayton	3
1989	Stagg Bowl	Dayton	17	Union (NY)	7
1991	Stagg Bowl	Ithaca	34	Dayton	20
2007	Gridiron Classic	Dayton	42	Albany	21

=== Sports Network Cup results ===
Season	Bowl	Champion		Runner-up	
1993	Sports Network Cup	Dayton	27	Iona	3
1996	Sports Network Cup	Dayton	27	Duquesne	3
1997	Sports Network Cup	Georgetown	28	Dayton	3
1999	Sports Network Cup	Dayton	14	Robert Morris	6
2001	Sports Network Cup	Sacred Heart	21	Dayton	7
2002	Sports Network Cup	Dayton	17	Albany	7

== Baseball ==
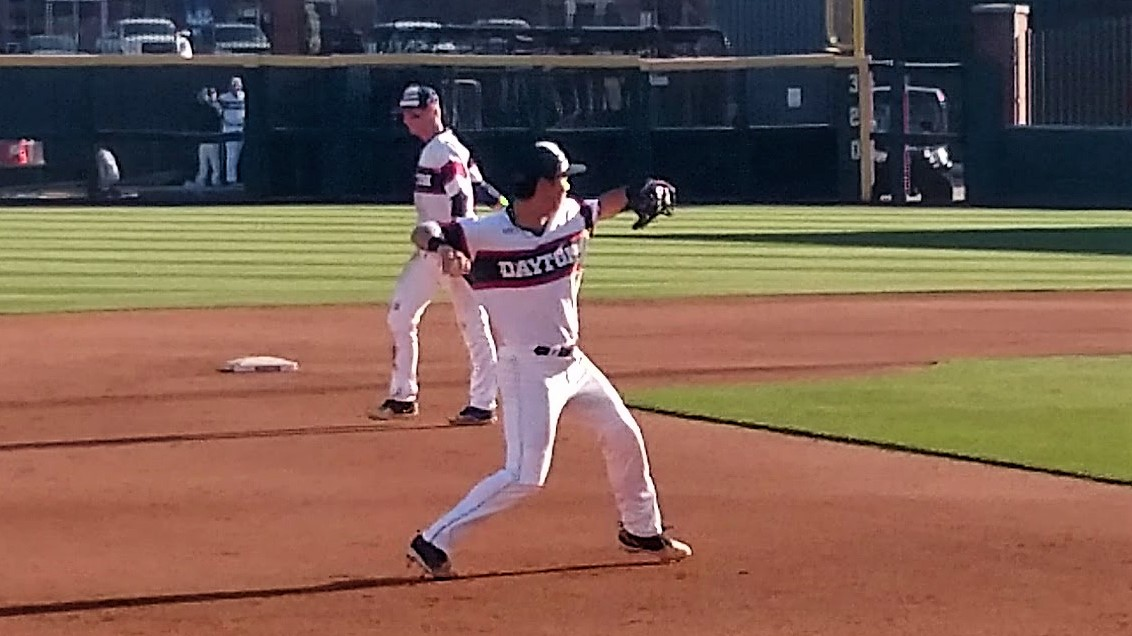
Flyers third baseman Takahiro Yamada warms up for the Dayton Flyers baseball team

== Mascot ==
Rudy Flyer is the mascot of the Dayton Flyers. He is dressed in early pilots attire including a scarf and goggles. Each year two or three students share the responsibility of wearing the Rudy suit. He has been the mascot since 1980.

== Notable student–athletes ==
- Don Meineke (1952) – former NBA player of the Fort Wayne Pistons, Rochester Royals, and Cincinnati Royals. He was the NBA Rookie of the Year in 1952–53.
- Chuck Noll (1953) – Played football for the Flyers. Played in the NFL for the Cleveland Browns. He won four Super Bowls as the head coach of the NFL's Pittsburgh Steelers
- Jim Paxson Sr. (1956) – former NBA player of the Minneapolis Lakers and Cincinnati Royals
- Jim Katcavage (1956) – former NFL defensive lineman who played for the New York Giants. His 96.5 career sacks is tied with Michael Strahan for second most in Giant's team history.
- Gerry Faust (1957) – former head football coach for the University of Notre Dame Fighting Irish and Akron Zips
- Fred Dugan (1958) – former NFL tight end who played for the San Francisco 49ers, Dallas Cowboys, and Washington Redskins
- Bucky Bockhorn (1958) – former NBA player of the Cincinnati Royals
- Emil Karas (1959) – former NFL and AFL linebacker who played for the Washington Redskins and San Diego Chargers
- Garry Roggenburk (1962) – Played baseball and basketball at UD. He was the Captain of the 1962 NIT Champion Flyers team that finished 24–6. He played Major League Baseball for Minnesota Twins and Boston Red Sox .
- Harold Schoen (1963) – Dr. Schoen played on the 1962 NIT Champion Flyers team that finished 24–6. He is a professor of Mathematics and Education at the University of Iowa.
- Hank Finkel (1966) – former NBA and ABA player of the Los Angeles Lakers, San Diego Rockets, and Boston Celtics
- Roger Brown (1967) – former ABA player of the Indiana Pacers, Utah Stars, and Memphis Sounds
- Don May (1968) – former NBA player of the New York Knicks, Buffalo Braves, Atlanta Hawks, Philadelphia 76ers, and Kansas City-Omaha Kings.
- Michael DeForest Wilson (1969) – former NFL and CFL offensive lineman who played for the Cincinnati Bengals, Buffalo Bills, and Edmonton Eskimos
- Don Smith (1974) – former NBA player of the Philadelphia 76ers
- Johnny Davis (1976) – former NBA player for the Portland Trail Blazers, Indiana Pacers, Atlanta Hawks, and Cleveland Cavaliers, former head coach for the Philadelphia 76ers and Orlando Magic
- Jim Paxson Jr. (1979) – former NBA player for the Boston Celtics and Portland Trail Blazers, former general manager for the Cleveland Cavaliers
- Roosevelt Chapman (1984) – The all-time leading men's basketball scorer. Drafted in the third round of the 1984 NBA draft by the Kansas City Kings
- Sedric Toney (1985) – former NBA player for the Phoenix Suns, New York Knicks, Indiana Pacers, Sacramento Kings, and Cleveland Cavaliers
- Jon Gruden (1986) – Played football for the Flyers. He was the head coach of the Super Bowl winning Tampa Bay Buccaneers and also of the Oakland Raiders.
- Anthony Grant (1987) – Former head basketball coach of the Alabama Crimson Tide, current Head basketball coach of Dayton's Men's Basketball team (2017 – present)
- Negele Knight (1990) – former NBA player for the Phoenix Suns, San Antonio Spurs, Portland Trail Blazers, Toronto Raptors, and Detroit Pistons
- Mark Schulte (1999) – Professional soccer player. He has played for the Cleveland City Stars, Minnesota Thunder, and Columbus Crew.
- Jerry Blevins (2004) – Major League Baseball relief pitcher for Oakland Athletics
- Chris Rolfe (2005) – Striker with Chicago Fire
- Craig Stammen (2005) – Major League Baseball pitcher for the Washington Nationals.
- Dasan Robinson (2006) – former defender for the Chicago Fire in the MLS.
- Isaac Kissi (2010) – Forward for Rochester Rhinos in the USL Pro.
- Chris Wright (2011) – Professional Basketball Player formally playing with the Golden State Warriors of the NBA, now with the Maine Red Claws of the NBA Development League
- Obi Toppin (2020) – current NBA player with the Indiana Pacers; consensus Division I player of the year in 2020
