= PPK =

PPK may refer to:

== Politics ==
- Parliamentary Party of Kosovo
- Pedro Pablo Kuczynski, president of Peru from 2016 to 2018
  - Peruvians for Change (Peruanos Por el Kambio), Kuczynski's political party

== Other uses ==
- P_{pk}, a process performance index
- PPK (duo), a Russian trance duo
- .ppk, PuTTY private key file format
- Walther PPK, a variant of the Walther PP pistol
- Pedro Pablo Kuczynski (born 1938), also known as PPK, former President of Peru
- Personal preference kit, an allowance of personal items that an astronaut can bring on a mission
