= NCAA Division I FCS consensus mid-major football national championship =

American football championship

The NCAA Division I FCS mid-major national football championship was a label that began in 2001 and ended after the 2007 season. Prior to 2001, mid-major national champions were named by various polls like Don Hansen's National Weekly Football Gazette and the Dopke collegesportsreport.com polls, but no "consensus" champion was named. Beginning with the 2008 season, the Sports Network ceased the mid-major poll and began including the teams previously ranked in the mid-major poll into more serious consideration for the full Division I FCS poll.

Generally, the teams that were ranked in the poll were from three conferences, the Pioneer Football League, the Northeast Conference, and the Metro Atlantic Athletic Conference (before pulling sponsorship of FCS football after the 2007 season). These conferences were three of six Division I FCS football conferences that did not receive automatic bids to the NCAA Division I Football Championship Subdivision championship tournament. (Beginning with the 2010 season, the winner of the Northeast Conference has been awarded an automatic bid to the FCS playoffs. The Pioneer Football League did not receive an automatic bid, or any at-large bids for that matter, until 2013.)

The Sports Network Cup was awarded annually to the winner. Like the Stanley Cup, the Sports Network Cup was a traveling trophy. It spent the year at the winning school and was passed on to the next winner annually.

The polls that were used to determine the annual champion are the Sports Network (for which the trophy is named), Don Hansen's National Weekly Football Gazette, and the Dopke College Sports Report Polls.

(Notes: A team did not have to be named the national champion by all three polls in order to win the Sports Network Cup. They were only named so by the Sports Network. Hence, the trophy was named the Sports Network Cup. "Consensus" in this instance then meant more in the regard of the Sports Network's authority to name a national champion rather than an agreement by all three major polls.)

== Mid-major national football consensus champions ==
Year	Champion	Coach	League	Record	Ref.
2001	Sacred Heart	Jim Fleming	Northeast Conference	11–0	
2002	Dayton	Mike Kelly	Pioneer Football League	11–1	
2003	Duquesne	Greg Gattuso	Metro Atlantic Athletic Conference	8–3	
2004	Monmouth	Kevin Callahan	Northeast Conference	10–1	
2005	San Diego	Jim Harbaugh	Pioneer Football League	10–1	
2006	San Diego	Jim Harbaugh	Pioneer Football League	11–1	
2007	Dayton	Mike Kelly	Pioneer Football League	11–1	

== Sports Network Cup champions ==
The voting for the Sports Network Cup champions consisted of media covering FCS mid-major schools, as well as media relations professionals from each of the eligible institutions.

Season	Champion		Runner-up		Ref.
2001	Sacred Heart Pioneers	15	Dayton Flyers	6	
2002	Dayton Flyers	17	Duquesne Dukes	7	
2003	Duquesne Dukes	12	San Diego Toreros	6	
2004	Monmouth Hawks	19	Drake Bulldogs	5	
2005	San Diego Toreros	26	Dayton Flyers	0	
2006	San Diego Toreros	20	Monmouth Hawks	0	
2007	Dayton Flyers	30	San Diego Toreros	0	

*Note: Score equals the number of first place votes

== See also ==
- College football national championships in NCAA Division I FBS
- NCAA Division I Football Championship
- NCAA Division II Football Championship
- NCAA Division III Football Championship
- NAIA Football National Championship
- NJCAA National Football Championship
