= Dayton Flyers football =

Football program representing Dayton University

| 2026 Dayton Flyers football team |
- First season: 1905; 121 years ago
- Athletic director: Neil Sullivan
- Head coach: Trevor Andrews; 3rd season, 17–16 (.515)
- Location: Dayton, Ohio
- Stadium: Welcome Stadium (capacity: 11,000)
- NCAA division: Division I FCS
- Conference: Pioneer Football League
- Colors: Red and blue
- All-time record: 718–400–25 (.639)
- Bowl record: 0–1 (.000)

NCAA Division III championships
- 1980, 1989

Conference championships
- PFL: 1993, 1994, 1996, 1997, 1999, 2000, 2001, 2002, 2007, 2009, 2010, 2015, 2026

Division championships
- PFL North: 2001, 2002
- Rivalries: Drake; Butler
- Mascot: Rudy Flyer
- Website: DaytonFlyers.com

The Dayton Flyers football program is the intercollegiate American football team for the University of Dayton located in the U.S. state of Ohio. The team competes in the NCAA Division I Football Championship Subdivision (FCS) and are members of the Pioneer Football League. Dayton's first football team was fielded in 1905. The team plays its home games at the 11,000 seat Welcome Stadium in Dayton, Ohio. The Flyers are coached by Trevor Andrews.

== History ==
=== Classifications ===
- 1906–1955: NCAA
- 1956–1972: NCAA University Division
- 1973–1976: NCAA Division I
- 1977–1992: NCAA Division III
- 1993–present: NCAA Division I–AA/FCS

=== Conference memberships ===
- 1905–1925: Independent
- 1926–1934: Ohio Athletic Conference
- 1935–1938: Buckeye Athletic Association
- 1939–1955: Independent
- 1956–1972: University Division Independent
- 1973–1976: Division I Independent
- 1977–1992: Division III Independent
- 1993–present: Pioneer Football League

== Notable former players ==
Notable alumni include:

- Jon A. Husted (1985–1989), Incumbent United States Senator from Ohio, Lt. Governor 2019-2025
- Jon Gruden (1982–1984), graduated in 1985 and former head coach of the Tampa Bay Buccaneers and the Las Vegas Raiders.
- Kelvin Kirk (1953–2003), first Mr. Irrelevant and CFL player
- Gary Kosins (born 1949), American football player
- Bill Lange (1928–1995), American football player
- Jim Katcavage (1952–1956), New York Giants football player for 13 years and three time all-Pro defensive end.
- Chuck Noll (1948–1952), Cleveland Browns football player and 4x Super Bowl winning coach for Pittsburgh Steelers.
- Brandon Staley (2003–2004), former Dayton Flyers quarterback and former head coach of the Los Angeles Chargers.
- Adam Trautman (2015–2019), American football player on the Denver Broncos. He was the first Dayton player drafted (2020) since 1977.
- Trevor Andrews (1994–1997), American football safety and current head coach of the Dayton Flyers football team.

== Championships ==
=== National championships ===
Dayton has won two national championships, both during their tenure in Division III. Dayton has made five appearances in the NCAA Division III National Championship Game, also known as the Stagg Bowl. The Flyers defeated Ithaca, 63–0 in the 1980 championship game, and defeated Union (NY) 17–7 in the 1989 championship game. The Flyers were unsuccessful in three other championship game appearances, losing 17–10 to Widener in 1981, 19–3 to Wagner in 1987, and 34–20 to Ithaca in 1991. The Flyers have also won two FCS Mid-Major National Championships the first in 2002 and again in 2007.

| Season | Coach | Selector | Record | Score | Opponent |
|---|---|---|---|---|---|
| 1980 | Rick Carter | Division III | 14–0 | 63–0 | Ithaca |
| 1989 | Mike Kelly | Division III | 13–0–1 | 17–7 | Union (NY) |

=== Conference championships ===
Dayton has won 13 conference championships, six outright and seven shared.

| Season | Conference | Coach | Overall Record | Conference Record |
|---|---|---|---|---|
| 1993 | Pioneer Football League | Mike Kelly | 9–1 | 5–0 |
| 1994† | Pioneer Football League | Mike Kelly | 8–2 | 4–1 |
| 1996 | Pioneer Football League | Mike Kelly | 11–0 | 5–0 |
| 1997 | Pioneer Football League | Mike Kelly | 9–1 | 5–0 |
| 1999 | Pioneer Football League | Mike Kelly | 6–4 | 4–0 |
| 2000† | Pioneer Football League | Mike Kelly | 8–3 | 3–1 |
| 2001 | Pioneer Football League | Mike Kelly | 10–1 | 4–0 |
| 2002 | Pioneer Football League | Mike Kelly | 11–1 | 4–0 |
| 2007† | Pioneer Football League | Mike Kelly | 11–1 | 6–1 |
| 2009† | Pioneer Football League | Rick Chamberlin | 9–2 | 7–1 |
| 2010† | Pioneer Football League | Rick Chamberlin | 10–1 | 8–0 |
| 2015† | Pioneer Football League | Rick Chamberlin | 10–2 | 7–1 |
| 2026† | Pioneer Football League | Trevor Andrews | 10–1 | 7–1 |

† denotes co-champions

=== Divisional championships ===
From 2001–2005, the Pioneer Football League was divided into North and South Divisions, with the winners of those divisions participating in a conference championship game. As winners of the Pioneer Football League's North Division, Dayton has made two appearances in the Pioneer Football League Championship Game, in 2001 and 2002.

| Season | Division | Opponent | Result |
|---|---|---|---|
| 2001 | PFL North | Jacksonville | W, 46–14 |
| 2002 | PFL North | Morehead State | W, 28–0 |

== Bowl game appearances ==
Dayton has participated in one bowl game, with the Flyers having a record of 0–1.

| Season | Coach | Bowl | Opponent | Result |
|---|---|---|---|---|
| 1951 | Joe Gavin | Salad Bowl | Houston | L, 21–26 |

They also played in the Gridiron Classic in 2007 against Northeast Conference opponent Albany, winning 42–21.

The Sports Network Cup was a way of determining the best mid major team in Division I FCS, with first place votes determining the winner between teams from the Pioneer Football League, the Northeast Conference, and the Metro Atlantic Athletic Conference.

| Season | Champion | | Runner-up | |
|---|---|---|---|---|
| 2001 | Sacred Heart Pioneers | 15 | Dayton Flyers | 6 |
| 2002 | Dayton Flyers | 17 | Albany Great Danes | 7 |
| 2005 | San Diego Toreros | 26 | Dayton Flyers | 0 |
| 2007 | Dayton Flyers | 30 | San Diego Toreros | 0 |

== Playoff appearances ==
=== NCAA Division I FCS ===
Dayton has made one appearance in the FCS playoffs. Their record is 0–1.

| Year | Round | Opponent | Result |
|---|---|---|---|
| 2015 | First Round | Western Illinois | L, 7–24 |

=== NCAA Division III ===
The Flyers made eleven appearances in the NCAA Division III football playoffs. Their combined record was 16–9.

| Year | Round | Opponent | Result |
|---|---|---|---|
| 1978 | Quarterfinals | Carnegie Mellon | L, 21–24 |
| 1980 | Quarterfinals; Semifinals; Stagg Bowl | Baldwin Wallace; Widener; Ithaca | W, 34–0; W, 28–24; W, 63–0 |
| 1981 | Quarterfinals; Semifinals; Stagg Bowl | Augustana (IL); Lawrence; Widener | W, 19–7; W, 38–0; L, 10–17 |
| 1984 | Quarterfinals | Augustana (IL) | L, 13–14 |
| 1986 | First Round | Mount Union | L, 36–42 |
| 1987 | First Round; Quarterfinals; Semifinals; Stagg Bowl | Capital; Augustana (IL); Central (IA); Wagner | W, 28–52; W, 38–36; W, 34–0; L, 3–19 |
| 1988 | First Round | Wittenberg | L, 28–35 ^{OT} |
| 1989 | First Round; Quarterfinals; Semifinals; Stagg Bowl | John Carroll; Millikin; Saint John's (MN); Union (NY) | W, 35–10; W, 28–16; W, 28–0; W, 17–7 |
| 1990 | First Round; Quarterfinals | Augustana (IL); Allegheny | W, 24–14; L, 23–31 |
| 1991 | First Round; Quarterfinals; Semifinals; Stagg Bowl | Baldwin Wallace; Allegheny; Saint John's (MN); Ithaca | W, 27–10; W, 28–25 ^{OT} W, 19–7; L, 20–34 |
| 1992 | First Round | Mount Union | L, 10–27 |

== Future non-conference opponents ==
Announced schedules as of January 15, 2026.

| 2026 | 2027 | 2028 |
|---|---|---|
| Fairmont State | Thomas More | at South Dakota State |
| Thomas More | at Western Illinois | |
| at Eastern Kentucky | | |
