= 2002 Sports Network Cup =

Final positions
- Champions: Dayton Flyers
- Runners-up: Duquesne Dukes

The 2002 Sports Network Cup was a college football postseason NCAA Division I FCS Mid-Major Championship Series. The Dayton Flyers finished ahead of the Duquesne Dukes 20–7 in first places votes to be named the NCAA Division I FCS Mid-Major Football National Champions.

Team (First place votes)	Record (W-L)	Points
Dayton (20)	11-1	286
Duquesne (7)	11-1	267
Albany (2)	8-4	235
Stony Brook (1)	8-2	217
Morehead State	9-3	187
Davidson	7-3	144
Sacred Heart	7-3	124
Wagner	7-4	85
Marist	7-4	71
Saint Peter's	6-5	29

- Dropped Out: None
- Others receiving votes (in order of points, minimum of five required): None.

== See also ==
- NCAA Division I FCS Consensus Mid-Major Football National Championship
