= 2003 Sports Network Cup =

Final positions
- Champions: Duquesne Dukes
- Runners-up: San Diego Toreros

The 2003 Sports Network Cup was a college football postseason NCAA Division I FCS Mid-Major Championship Series. The Duquesne Dukes finished ahead of San Diego Toreros 12–6 in first places votes to be named the NCAA Division I FCS Mid-Major Football National Champions.

Team (First place votes)	Record (W-L)	Points
Duquesne (12)	8-3	205
San Diego (6)	8-2	183
Valparaiso (2)	8-4	170
Monmouth (1)	10-2	168
Dayton (2)	9-2	157
Morehead State	8-3	151
Albany	7-4	93
Stony Brook	6-4	65
Robert Morris	6-4	45
Wagner	6-5	20

- Dropped Out: None.
- Others receiving votes (in order of points, minimum of five required): Iona.

== See also ==
- NCAA Division I FCS Consensus Mid-Major Football National Championship
