= 2001 Sports Network Cup =

Final positions
- Champions: Sacred Heart Pioneers
- Runners-up: Dayton Flyers

The 2001 Sports Network Cup was a college football postseason poll by The Sports Network website. The Sacred Heart Pioneers finished first in the poll getting 204 points and 15 first place votes to be named the NCAA Division I FCS Mid-Major Football National Champions by the Sports Network. The Dayton Flyers finished second in the polling receiving 194 points and 6 first place votes.

School (First place votes)	Record (W–L)	Points
Sacred Heart (15)	11–0	204
Dayton (6)	10–1	194
Saint Peter's	10–1	163
Duquesne	8–3	147
Robert Morris	6–3	125
San Diego	6–3	94
Monmouth	7–3	81
Albany	7–3	73
Jacksonville	6–5	49
Morehead State	6–5	18

- Dropped Out: None.
- Others receiving votes (in order of points, minimum of five required): Drake

== See also ==
- NCAA Division I FCS Consensus Mid-Major Football National Championship
