= 2004 Sports Network Cup =

Final positions
- Champions: Monmouth Hawks
- Runners-up: Drake Bulldogs

The 2004 Sports Network Cup was a college football postseason NCAA Division I FCS Mid-Major Championship Series. The Monmouth Hawks finished ahead of the Drake Bulldogs 19-5 in first places votes to be named the NCAA Division I FCS Mid-Major Football National Champions.

| Team (First place votes) | Record (W-L) | Points |
|---|---|---|
| Monmouth (19) | 10-1 | 235 |
| Drake (5) | 10-2 | 220 |
| Central Connecticut State | 8-2 | 185 |
| San Diego | 7-4 | 157 |
| Duquesne | 7-3 | 150 |
| Dayton | 7-3 | 132 |
| Sacred Heart | 6-4 | 92 |
| Robert Morris | 6-5 | 59 |
| Morehead State | 6-6 | 48 |
| Wagner | 6-5 | 39 |

- Dropped Out: None
- Others receiving votes (in order of points, minimum of five required): Albany (3)

Note: Voting was conducted by a panel of 91 FCS media members and media relations professionals. A first-place vote is worth five points, a second- place vote is worth four points, a third-place vote is worth three points, a fourth-place vote is worth two points, and a fifth-place vote is worth one point. Votes were due by Wednesday, November 26, 2004, following the final week of the regular season. Postseason play has no effect on the outcome of the awards.

== See also ==
- NCAA Division I FCS Consensus Mid-Major Football National Championship
