= 2006 Sports Network Cup =

Final positions
- Champions: San Diego Toreros
- Runners-up: Monmouth Hawks

The 2006 Sports Network Cup was a college football postseason NCAA Division I FCS Mid-Major Championship Series. The San Diego Toreros finished ahead of Monmouth Hawks 20–0 in first places votes to be named the NCAA Division I FCS Mid-Major Football National Champions.

Team (First place votes)	Record (W-L)	Points
San Diego (20)	11–1	200
Monmouth	10–2	179
Drake	9–2	160
Central Connecticut State	8–3	132
Albany	7–4	108
Duquesne	7–3	106
Robert Morris	7–4	87
Davidson	6–4	57
Stony Brook	5–6	45
Jacksonville	4–6	19

- Dropped Out: None
- Others receiving votes (in order of points, minimum of five required): Marist (5)

Note: Voting was conducted by a panel of 112 FCS media members and media relations professionals. A first-place vote is worth five points, a second- place vote is worth four points, a third-place vote is worth three points, a fourth-place vote is worth two points, and a fifth-place vote is worth one point. Votes were due by Wednesday, November 22, 2006, following the final week of the regular season. Postseason play has no effect on the outcome of the awards.

== See also ==
- NCAA Division I FCS Consensus Mid-Major Football National Championship
