= 2005 Sports Network Cup =

Final positions
- Champions: San Diego Toreros
- Runners-up: Dayton Flyers

The 2005 Sports Network Cup was a college football postseason NCAA Division I FCS Mid-Major Championship Series. The San Diego Toreros finished ahead of Dayton Flyers 26-0 in first places votes to be named the NCAA Division I FCS Mid-Major Football National Champions.

Team (First place votes)	Record (W-L)	Points
San Diego (26)	11-1	260
Dayton	9-1	232
Duquesne	7-3	207
Morehead State	8-4	160
Marist	7-4	149
Drake	6-4	142
Central Connecticut State	7-4	107
Monmouth	6-4	69
Stony Brook	6-5	61
Jacksonville	4-4	18

- Dropped Out: None
- Others receiving votes (in order of points, minimum of five required): Albany (15), Wagner (12)

Note: Voting was conducted by a panel of 91 FCS media members and media relations professionals. A first-place vote is worth five points, a second- place vote is worth four points, a third-place vote is worth three points, a fourth-place vote is worth two points, and a fifth-place vote is worth one point. Votes were due by Wednesday, November 26, 2005, following the final week of the regular season. Postseason play has no effect on the outcome of the awards.
