= Personal preference kit =

Container for astronauts' personal items

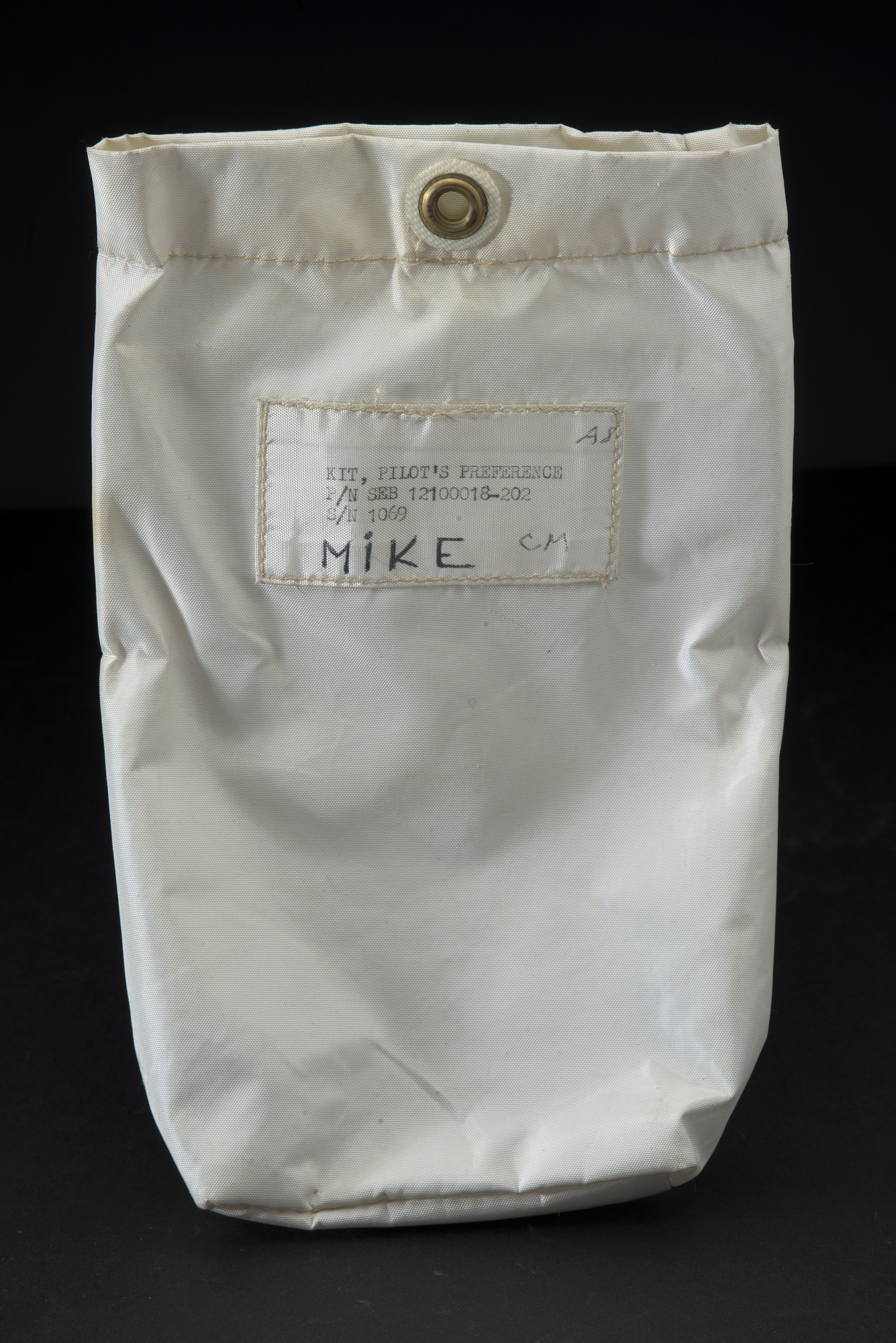
Michael Collins' PPK from the Apollo 11 mission

The Personal Preference Kit (PPK) is a container used to carry the personal items of astronauts during the Gemini, Apollo, Space Shuttle, and International Space Station programs. Items that astronauts choose to carry into space are approved by NASA management and stored in PPKs. Information on the contents of kits are usually kept private by the astronaut, although some contents have been put on display or given as awards to contributors to space programs.

== Purpose ==
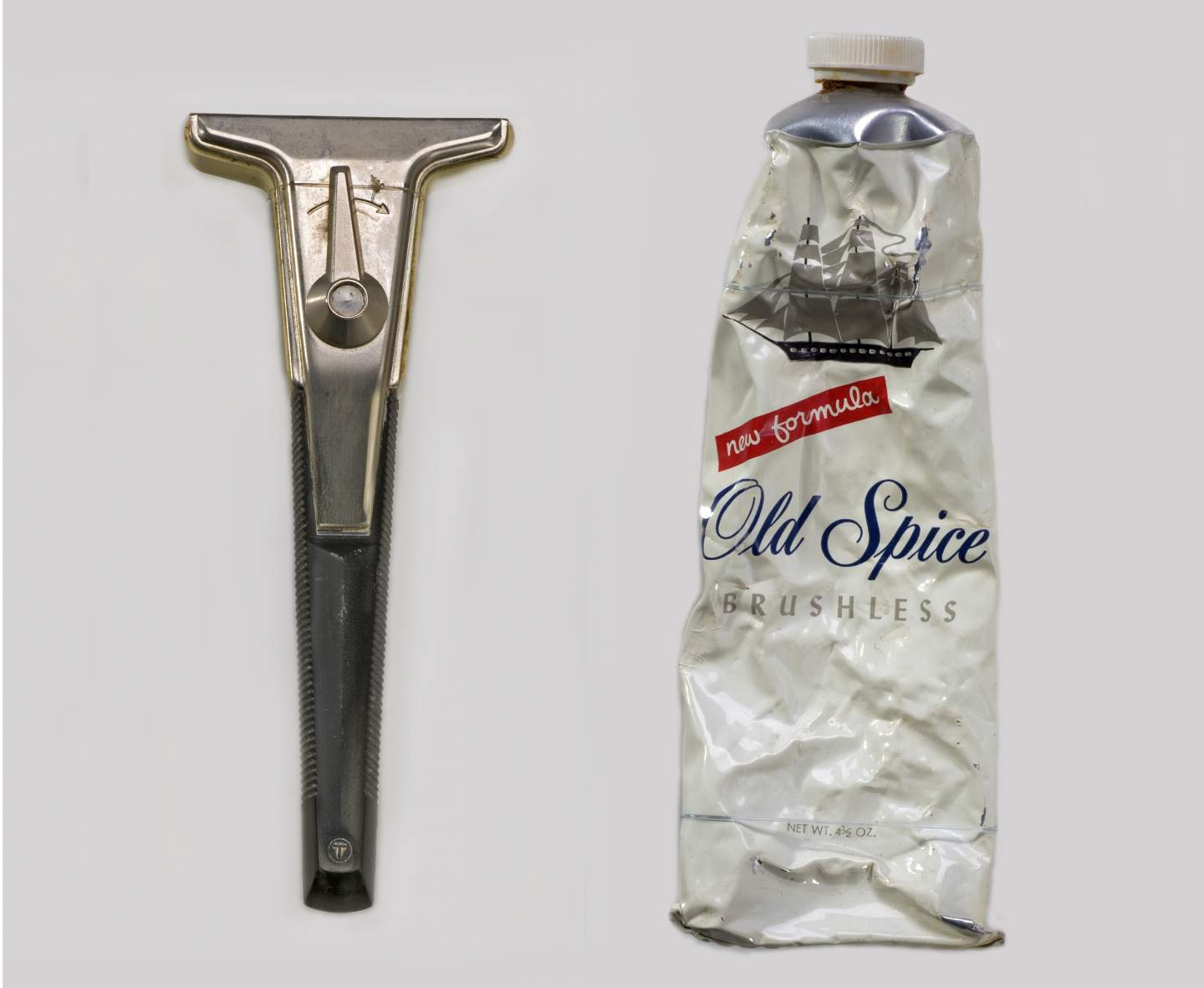
A razor and shaving cream, personal items used by Michael Collins during Apollo 11

Federal Aviation Regulations as of 2021 define the purpose of Personal Preference Kits as allowing "persons on particular mission to carry personal items for use as mementos"; mementos are defined as "flags, patches, insignia, medallions, minor graphics, and similar items of little commercial value". Astronauts were required to submit a manifest listing the items to be held in their PPKs as well as the ultimate recipients of the items, sixty days prior to their launch date.

Information on the items taken by astronauts is usually kept private. Some personal items have been put on display or given as awards to shuttle workers and VIPs.

== Usage ==
=== Gemini program ===
Project Gemini astronauts were authorized to take personal items on missions in a 6 in × 7 in (15 cm × 18 cm) nylon drawstring bag. Astronaut Wally Schirra disclosed the contents of the kit he took on the Gemini 6A mission, which contained his Navy wings, hunting license, and many medals, flags, and patches.

=== Apollo program ===
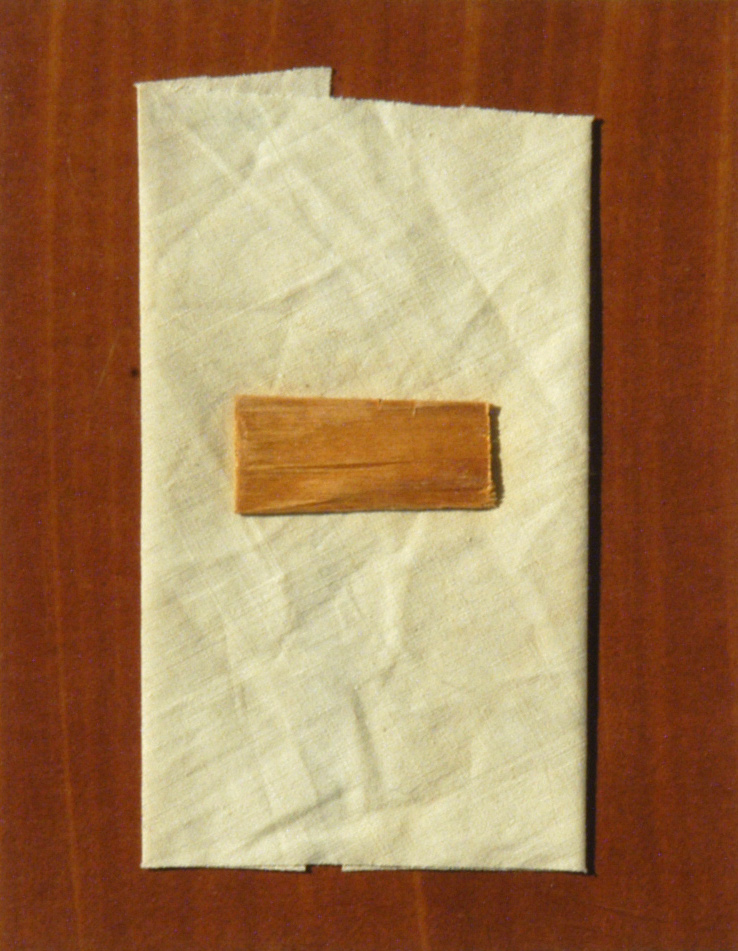
Pieces of wood and fabric of the 1903 Wright Flyer taken to the Moon in Armstrong's PPK

Continuing the usage of PPKs in the Gemini program, crew on Apollo spaceflights were also assigned PPKs in which they could store personal items and souvenirs. The PPKs were made from Beta cloth, a type of fireproof cloth added to Apollo/Skylab A7L space suits and used in other specialized applications. A sphere of aluminum taken by Frank Borman during Apollo 8 was later used to strike 200,000 space-flown medallions distributed to people who contributed to the Apollo program.

In a special arrangement with the United States Air Force Museum, Neil Armstrong brought wood from the propeller and fabric from the wing of the 1903 Wright Flyer, the first plane to achieve powered flight, in his PPK taken to the Moon on Apollo 11. On the same mission, Michael Collins brought the flag of the United States, the flag of Washington, D.C., and the flag of the Air Force, along with other items in his kit.

During Apollo 12, astronauts were given four aluminum copies of the mission plaque that was left on the Moon. When the copies were returned to Earth, one copy was given to NASA engineer Jack Kinzler, who created the copies, while the remaining copies were given to crew members Pete Conrad, Richard F. Gordon Jr., and Alan Bean.

As part of a joint project with the United States Forest Service, about 400 to 500 seeds of Douglas fir, loblolly pine, redwood, American sycamore, and sweetgum trees were stored in small containers in Stuart Roosa's PPK during the Apollo 14 mission. Upon his return to Earth, many of the seeds were germinated. Their seedlings were planted throughout the United States, Japan, Brazil, and Switzerland and grew to be the "Moon trees".

=== Space Shuttle program ===
During the era of the Space Shuttle program, astronauts were limited to bringing a maximum of 20 personal items that weighed a total of 3.3 pounds (1.5 kg) and fit into a 5 in × 8 in × 2 in (12.7 cm × 20.3 cm × 5.1 cm) bag. Astronauts were also given an Official Flight Kit (OFK) to carry items on the request of professional organizations or foreign governments. OFKs have carried larger items such as patches, flags of various countries, and awards that are later presented by an organization to its honorees.

Items taken on space shuttle flights by astronaut Rhea Seddon, who flew on three Space Shuttle missions, include a pennant from her university, a sorority pin, a baseball cap for a sports team, and a roll of calculator tape marked with the signatures of students from her hometown. In the fatal STS-107 mission, Israeli astronaut Ilan Ramon brought on board Columbia a copy of the pencil drawing Moon Landscape by Petr Ginz, a boy murdered in the Auschwitz concentration camp during the Holocaust.

=== International Space Station program ===
Within the International Space Station program, missions utilizing Soyuz and SpaceX Crew Dragon spacecraft both allow 3.3 pounds (1.5 kg) for personal items. Astronauts have frequently taken musical instruments and cameras to the ISS.
