= Wright Flyer =

First powered aircraft built by the Wright brothers

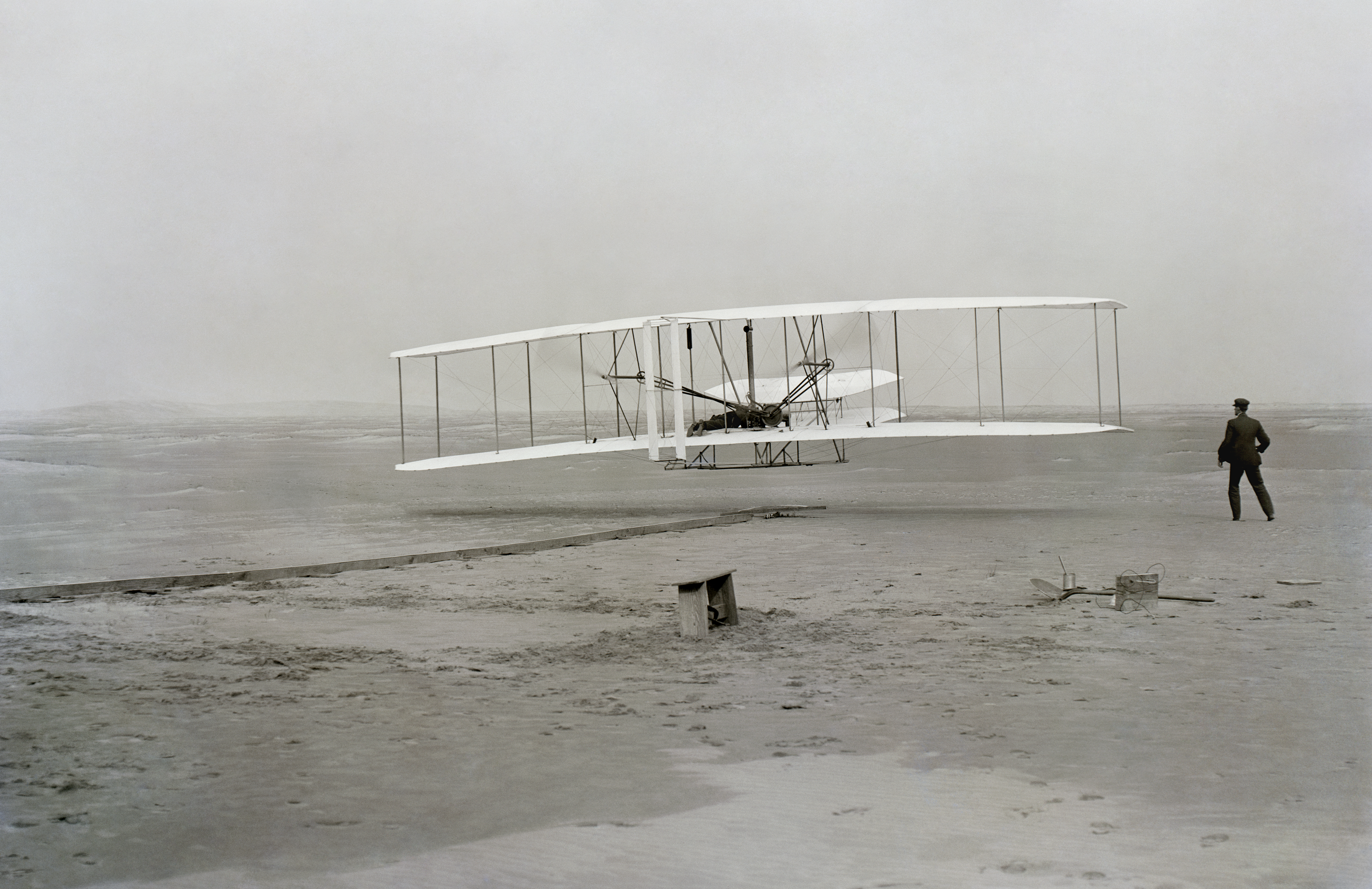
- First airplane flight, taking off from rail, near Kitty Hawk, North Carolina, on December 17, 1903

General information
- Other names: Kitty Hawk, Flyer I, 1903 Flyer
- Type: Experimental airplane
- National origin: United States
- Manufacturer: Wright Cycle Company
- Designer: Orville and Wilbur Wright
- Status: Preserved and displayed at the National Air and Space Museum
- Owners: Wright Brothers
- Number built: 1
- Flights: 4

History
- Manufactured: 1903
- First flight: December 17, 1903, 122 years ago
- Last flight: December 17, 1903
- Developed from: Wright Glider
- Developed into: Wright Flyer II; Wright Flyer III

The Wright Flyer (also known as the Kitty Hawk, Flyer I or the 1903 Flyer) made the first sustained flight by a manned heavier-than-air powered and controlled aircraft on December 17, 1903. Invented and flown by brothers Orville and Wilbur Wright, it marked the beginning of the pioneer era of aviation.

The aircraft is a single-place biplane design with anhedral (drooping) wings, front double elevator (a canard) and rear double rudder. It used a 12 horsepower (9 kilowatts) gasoline engine powering two pusher propellers. Employing "wing warping", it was relatively unstable and very difficult to fly.

The Wright brothers flew it four times in a location now part of the town of Kill Devil Hills, about 4 miles (6 kilometers) south of Kitty Hawk, North Carolina. The airplane flew 852 ft (260 m) on its fourth and final flight, but was damaged on landing, and wrecked minutes later when powerful gusts blew it over.

The brothers shipped the wreckage back to Dayton, and the aircraft never flew again. Orville later restored it and displayed it on several occasions. The Flyer joined the Smithsonian Institution's collection of historic aircraft in 1948 after the end of a long and bitter dispute between Orville and the Institution over its refusal to recognize the Flyer as the first successful airplane. Today, it is on display in a place of honor in the National Air and Space Museum in Washington, D.C.

== Design and construction ==
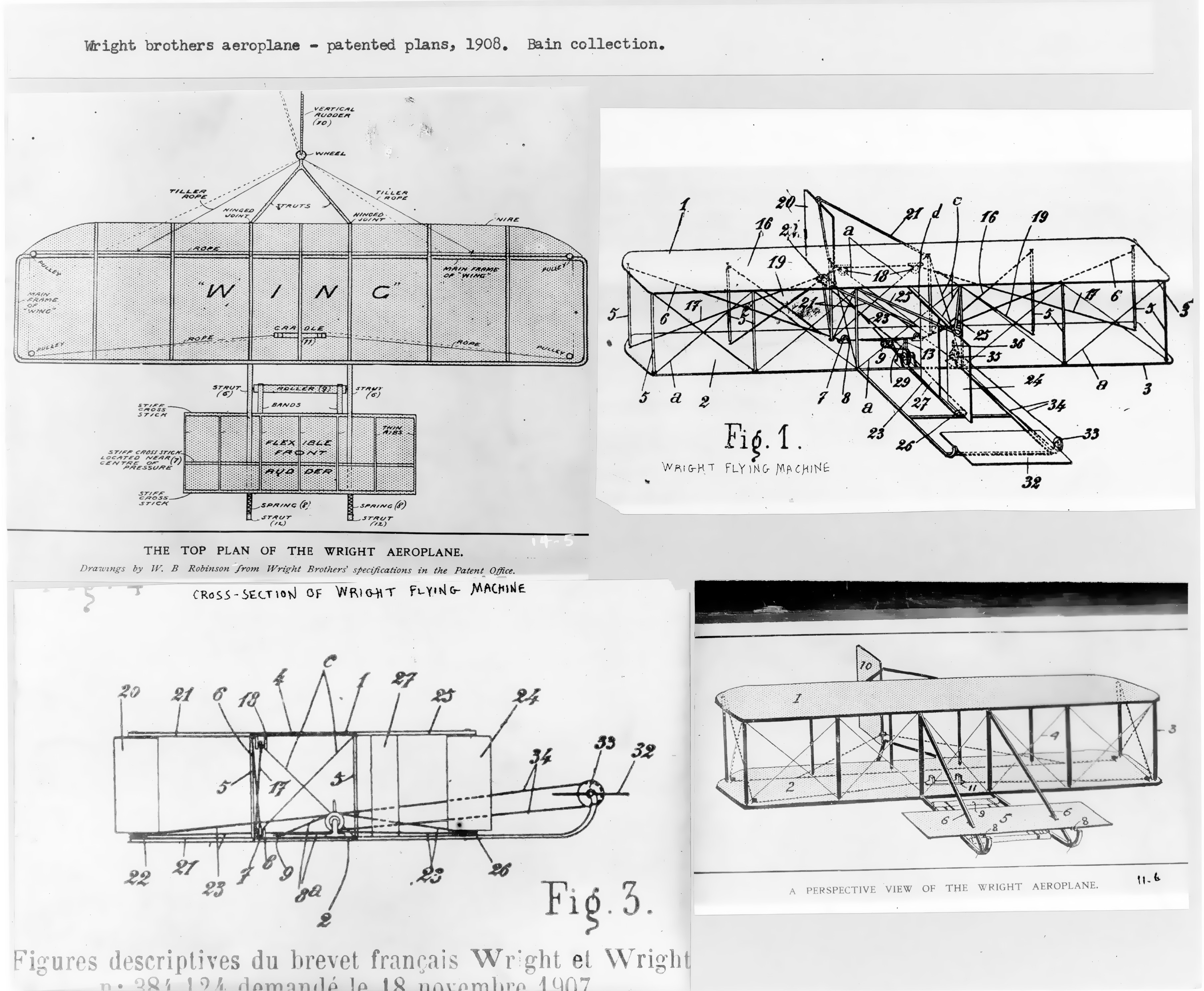
Patent plan

Detailed 3D model of the Wright Flyer

The Flyer was based on the Wrights' experience testing gliders at Kitty Hawk between 1900 and 1902. Their last glider, the 1902 Glider, led directly to the design of the Wright Flyer.

The Wrights built the aircraft in 1903 using spruce for straight members of the airframe (such as wing spars) and ash wood for curved components (wing ribs). The wings were designed with a 1-in-20 camber. The fabric for the wing was 100% cotton muslin called "Pride of the West", a type used for women's underwear. It had a warp of 107 threads per inch, a weft of 102, and a total thread count of 209. Since they could not find a suitable automobile engine for the task, they commissioned their employee Charlie Taylor to build a new design from scratch, a lightweight 12-horsepower (9-kilowatt) gasoline engine, weighing 180 pounds (82 kg), with a 1-US-gallon (3.8 L; 0.83 imp gal) fuel tank. A sprocket chain drive, borrowing from bicycle technology, powered the twin propellers, which were also made by hand. In order to avoid the risk of torque effects from affecting the aircraft handling, one drive chain was crossed over so that the propellers rotated in opposite directions. According to Taylor:

"They figured on four cylinders and estimated the bore and stroke at four inches. It took me six weeks to make that engine. The completed engine weighed 180 pounds and developed 12 horsepower at 1025 revolutions per minute...The body of the first engine was of cast aluminum, and was bored out on the lathe for independent cylinders. The pistons were cast iron, and these were turned down and grooved for piston rings. The rings were cast iron, too. A one-gallon fuel tank was suspended from a wing strut, and the gasoline fed by gravity down a tube to the engine. The fuel valve was an ordinary gaslight petcock. There was no carburetor as we know it today. The fuel was fed into a shallow chamber in the manifold. No spark plug. The spark was made by opening and closing of two contact points inside the combustion chamber. Dry batteries were used for starting the engine and then we switched onto a magneto bought from the Dayton Electric Company. There was no battery on the plane. Several lengths of speaking tube...were used in the radiator. We blocked-tested the motor before crating it for shipment to Kitty Hawk."

The 8.5 foot (2.6 m) long propellers were based on airfoil number 9 from their wind tunnel data, which provided the best "gliding angle" for different angles of attack. The propellers were connected to the engine by chains from the Indianapolis Chain Company, with a sprocket gear reduction of 23-to-8. Wilbur had calculated that slower turning blades generated greater thrust, and two of them were better than a single blade turning faster. Made from three laminations of spruce, the tips were covered with duck canvas, and the entire propeller painted with aluminum paint.

On November 5, 1903, the brothers tested their engine on the Wright Flyer at Kitty Hawk, but before they could tune the engine, the propeller hubs came loose. The drive shafts were sent back to Dayton for repair, and returned on 20 November. A hairline crack was discovered in one of the propeller shafts. Orville returned to Dayton on 30 November to make new spring steel shafts. On December 12, the brothers installed the new shafts on the Wright Flyer and tested it on their 60-foot (18 m) launching rail system that included a wheeled launching dolly. According to Orville:

"We had designed our propellers to give 90 pounds (41 kg) thrust at a speed of 330 rev. per minute (about 950 of engine), which we had figured would be the required amount for the machine weighing 630 pounds (290 kg)."

In practice tests, they were able to achieve a propeller rpm of 351, with a thrust of 132 pounds (60 kg), more than enough for their 700-pound (320 kg) flyer.

The Wright Flyer was a canard biplane configuration, with a wingspan of 40 feet 4 inches (12.29 m), a camber of 1-20, a wing area of 510 square feet (47 m^{2}), and a length of 21 feet 1 inch (6.43 m). The right wing was 4 inches (10 cm) longer because the engine was 30 to 40 pounds (14 to 18 kg) heavier than Orville or Wilbur. Unoccupied, the machine weighed 605 pounds (274 kg). As with the gliders, the pilot flew lying on his stomach on the lower wing with his head toward the front of the craft in an effort to reduce drag. The pilot was left of center while the engine was right of center. He steered by moving a hip cradle in the direction he wished to fly. The cradle pulled wires to warp the wings, and simultaneously turn the rudder, for coordinated flight. The pilot operated the elevator lever with his left hand, while holding a strut with his right. The Wright Flyer's "runway" was a 60-foot (18 m) track of 2x4s, which the brothers nicknamed the "Junction Railroad". The Wright Flyer skids rested on a launching dolly, consisting of a 6-foot (1.8 m) plank, with a wheeled wooden section. The two tandem ball bearing wheels were made from bicycle hubs. A restraining wire held the plane back, while the engine was running and the propellers turning, until the pilot was ready to be released.

The Wright Flyer had three instruments on board. A Veeder engine revolution recorder measured the number of propeller turns. A stopwatch recorded the flight time, and a Richard hand anemometer, attached to the front center strut, recorded the distance covered in meters.

== Flight trials at Kitty Hawk ==
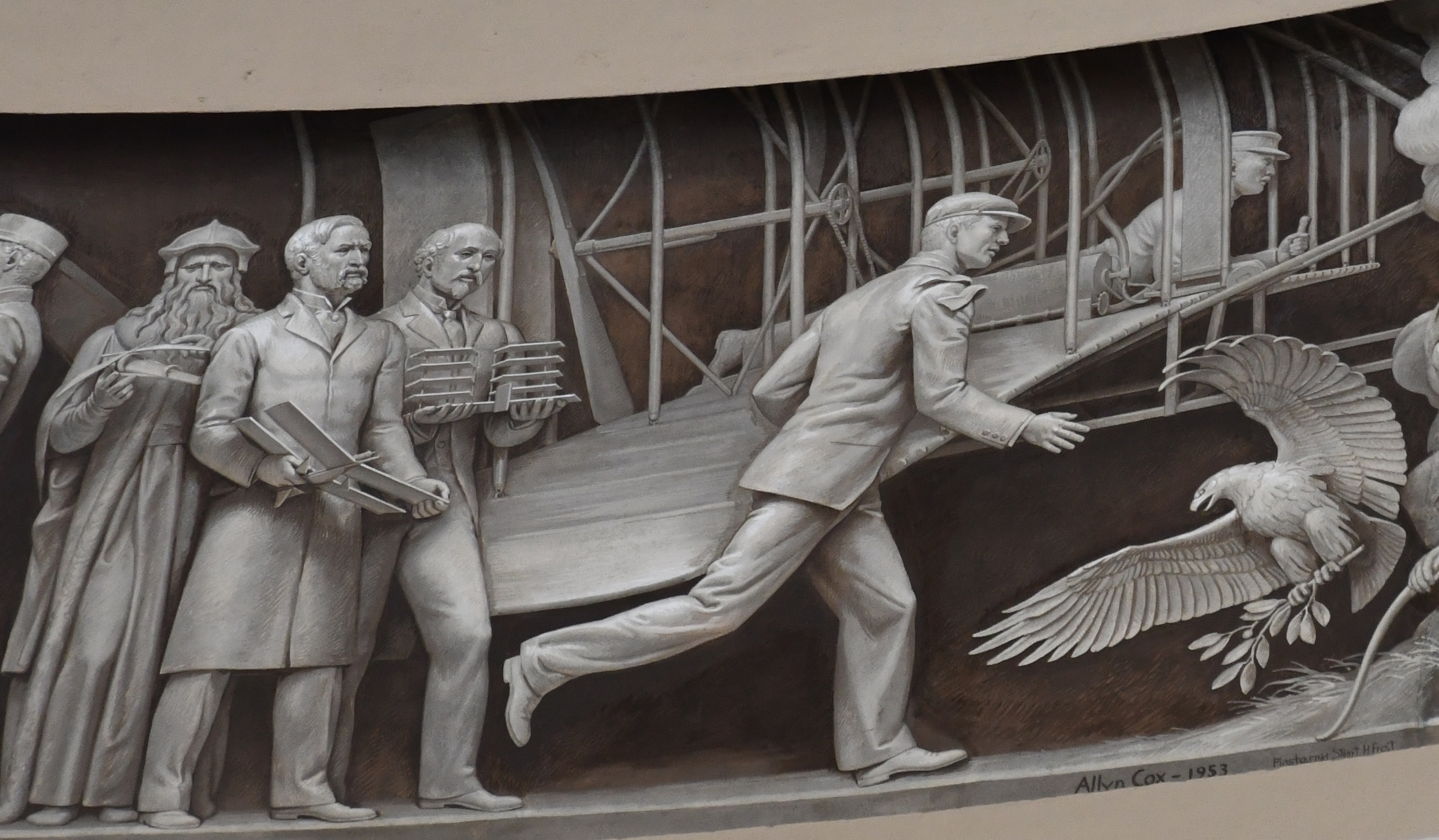
Displayed in the U.S. Capitol Rotunda, the Frieze of American History detail The Birth of Aviation depicts Leonardo da Vinci, Samuel Langley, Octave Chanute, and the Wright Flyer's first flight

Upon returning to Kitty Hawk in 1903, the Wrights completed assembly of the Flyer while practicing on the 1902 Glider from the previous season. On December 14, 1903, they felt ready for their first attempt at powered flight. With the help of men from the nearby government life-saving station, the Wrights moved the Flyer and its launching rail to the incline of a nearby sand dune, Big Kill Devil Hill, intending to make a gravity-assisted takeoff. The brothers tossed a coin to decide who would get the first chance at piloting, and Wilbur won. The airplane left the rail, but Wilbur pulled up too sharply, stalled, and came down after covering 105 ft (32 m) in 3 1/2 seconds, sustaining little damage.

Repairs after the abortive first flight took three days. When they were ready again on December 17, the wind was averaging more than 20 mph (32 km/h), so the brothers laid the launching rail pointed into the wind on level ground near their camp. This time the wind, instead of an inclined launch, provided the necessary airspeed for takeoff. Because Wilbur already had the first chance, Orville took his turn at the controls. His flight, captured in a famous photograph, lasted 12 seconds for a total distance of 120 feet (37 m) – shorter than the wingspan of a Boeing 747. The brothers made three more flights, taking turns. The second and third flights were 175 and 200 feet (53 and 61 m) in 12 and 15 seconds respectively. The fourth and last flight, by Wilbur, took 59 seconds to cover 852 feet (260 m) over the ground, moving through approximately a half mile (800 m) of flowing air.

The flights reached about ten feet (3 m) of altitude and were all essentially straight; turns were not attempted. Each landing was bumpy and unintended, and the fourth flight's landing broke the front elevator supports. The Wrights hoped to make repairs for a possible four-mile (6 km) flight to Kitty Hawk village, but minutes later a heavy gust picked up the Flyer and tumbled it end over end, damaging it beyond any hope of quick repair. It was never flown again.

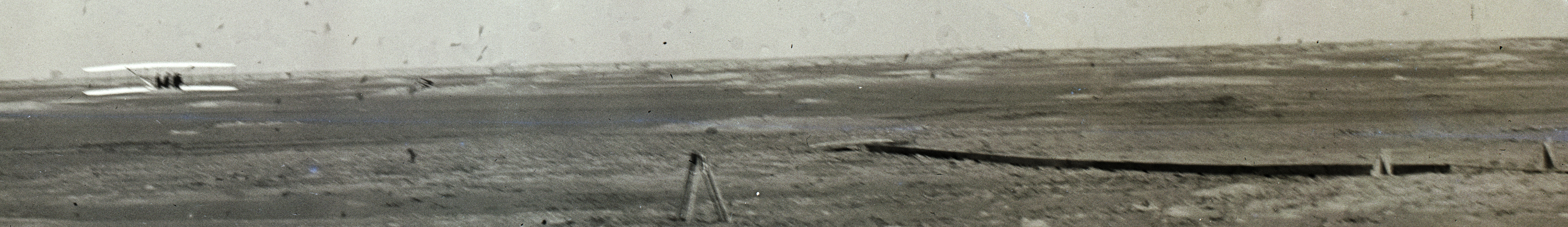
Distant view of the Wright airplane just after landing, taken from the starting point, with wing-rest in center of picture and launching rail at right. This flight, the fourth and final of 17 December 1903, was the longest: 852 feet (260 m) covered in 59 seconds. The photo was published in 1908.

In 1904, the Wrights continued refining their designs and piloting techniques in order to obtain fully controlled flight. Major progress toward this goal was achieved with a new machine, the Wright Flyer II, in 1904 and even more decisively in 1905 with the Wright Flyer III, in which Wilbur made a 39-minute, 24-mile (39 km) nonstop circling flight on October 5.

== Influence ==
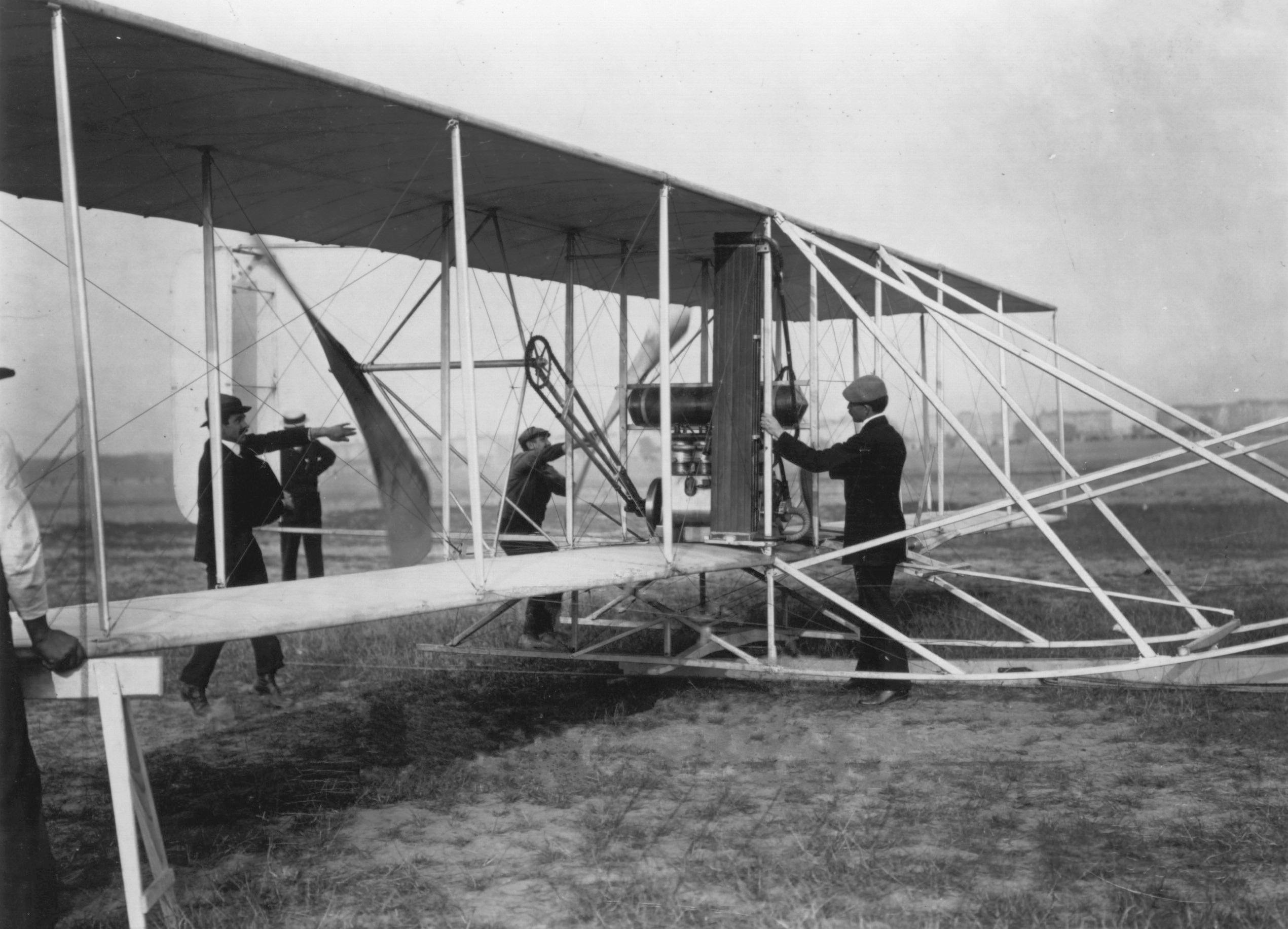
Orville Wright with a later Model A Flyer at Tempelhof Field in Berlin

The Flyer series of aircraft were the first to achieve controlled heavier-than-air flight, but some of the mechanical techniques the Wrights used to accomplish this were not influential for the development of aviation as a whole, although their theoretical achievements were. The Flyer design depended on wing-warping controlled by a hip cradle under the pilot, and a foreplane or "canard" for pitch control, features which would not scale and produced a hard-to-control aircraft. The Wrights' pioneering use of "roll control" by twisting the wings to change wingtip angle in relation to the airstream led to the more practical use of ailerons by others, such as Glenn Curtiss and Henri Farman. The Wrights' original concept of simultaneous coordinated roll and yaw control (rear rudder deflection), which they discovered in 1902, perfected in 1903–1905, and patented in 1906, represents the solution to controlled flight and is used today on virtually every fixed-wing aircraft. The Wright patent included the use of hinged rather than warped surfaces for the forward elevator and rear rudder. Other features that made the Flyer a success were highly efficient wings and propellers, which resulted from the Wrights' exacting wind tunnel tests and made the most of the marginal power delivered by their early homebuilt engines; slow flying speeds (and hence survivable accidents); and an incremental test/development approach. The future of aircraft design lay with rigid wings, ailerons and rear control surfaces. A British patent of 1868 for aileron technology had apparently been completely forgotten by the time the 20th century dawned.

After a single statement to the press in January 1904 and a failed public demonstration in May, the Wright Brothers did not publicize their efforts, and other aviators who were working on the problem of flight (notably Alberto Santos-Dumont with 14-bis) were thought by the press to have preceded them by many years. After their successful demonstration flight in France on August 8, 1908, they were accepted as pioneers and received extensive media coverage.

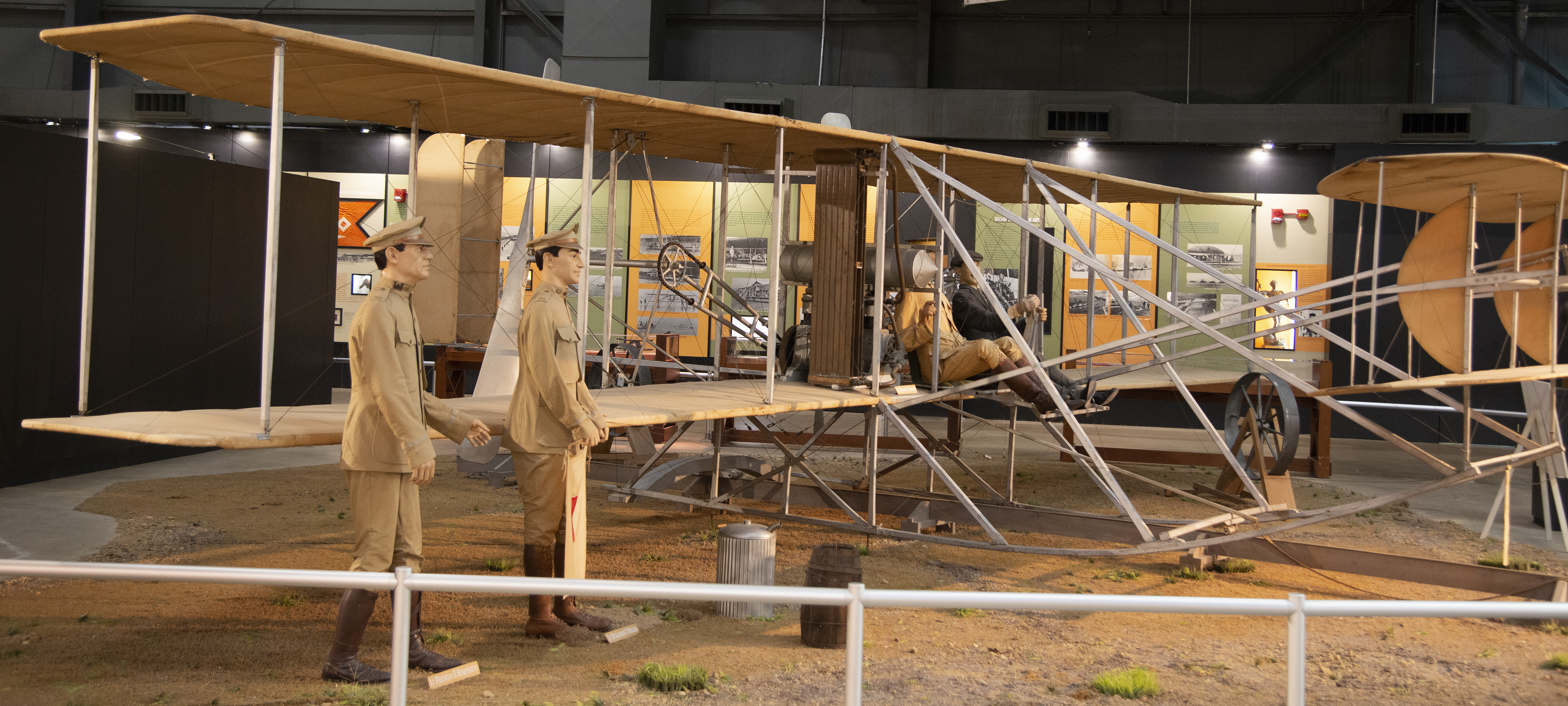
1909 Wright Military flier, Model B, (replica) at the National Museum of the United States Air Force

In 1909, the Wright Military Flyer became the world's first military aircraft after successful tests on June 3, 1909. This airplane was purchased by the army but was never used in combat; it was, however, used to train some pilots. It was donated to the Smithsonian Institution in 1911 and is on display in the Early Flight exhibit at the National Air and Space Museum. A modified version, the Wright Model B, was produced in larger numbers by the Wright brothers and was used by the army "for training pilots and conducting aerial experiments" including tests of "a bombsight and bomb-dropping device".

The issue of patent control was correctly seen as critical by the Wrights, and they acquired a wide American patent, intended to give them ownership of basic aerodynamic control. This was fought in both American and European courts. European designers were little affected by the litigation and continued their own development. The legal fight in the U.S. had a crushing effect on the nascent American aircraft industry, and even by the time of America's entry into World War I, in 1917, the U.S. had "only six [American made] airplanes, and fourteen trained pilots". The numbers increased substantially over the subsequent years but during the war, all of the fighter aircraft flown by Americans were designed and built in Europe.

=== Stability ===
The Wright Flyer was conceived as a control-canard, as the Wrights were more concerned with control than stability. It was found to be unstable and barely controllable. During flight tests near Dayton the Wrights added ballast to the nose of the aircraft to move the center of gravity forward and reduce pitch instability. The Wright Brothers did not understand the basics of pitch stability of the canard configuration. F.E.C. Culick stated, "The backward state of the general theory and understanding of flight mechanics hindered them... Indeed, the most serious gap in their knowledge was probably the basic reason for their unwitting mistake in selecting their canard configuration."

According to aviation author Harry Combs, "Wright designs incorporated a 'balanced' forward elevator...the movable surface extending an equal distance on both sides of its hinge or pivot axis, as opposed to an 'in-trail' configuration... which would have enhanced controllability in flight." Orville wrote of the elevator, which the brothers called a "front rudder", "I found the control of the front rudder quite difficult on account of its being balanced too near the center and thus had a tendency to turn itself when started so that the rudder was turned too far on one side and then too far on the other." Thus, these early flights suffered from overcontrol.

== After Kitty Hawk ==
A 1945 newsreel covering various firsts in human flight, including Wright Flyer footage

The Wright Brothers returned home to Dayton for Christmas after the flights of the Kitty Hawk Flyer. While they had abandoned their other gliders, they realized the historical significance of the Flyer. They shipped the heavily damaged craft back to Dayton, where it remained stored in crates behind a Wright Company shed for nine years. The Great Dayton Flood of March 1913 covered the Flyer in mud and water for eleven days.

Charlie Taylor relates in a 1948 article that the Flyer nearly got disposed of by the Wrights. In early 1912 Roy Knabenshue, the Wrights Exhibition team manager, had a conversation with Wilbur and asked Wilbur what they planned to do with the Flyer. Wilbur said they most likely will burn it, as they had the 1904 machine. According to Taylor, Knabenshue talked Wilbur out of disposing of the machine for historical purposes.

In 1910 the Wrights offered the Flyer as an exhibit at the Smithsonian Institution, but the Smithsonian declined, saying it would be willing to display other aeronautical artifacts from the brothers. Wilbur died in 1912, and in 1916 Orville brought the Flyer out of storage and prepared it for display at the Massachusetts Institute of Technology. He replaced parts of the wing covering, the props, and the engine's crankcase, crankshaft, and flywheel. The crankcase, crankshaft, and flywheel of the original engine had been sent to the Aero Club of America in New York for an exhibit in 1906 and were never returned to the Wrights. The replacement crankcase, crankshaft and flywheel came from the experimental engine Charlie Taylor had built in 1904 and used for testing in the bicycle shop. The original broken crankcase of the Flyer is on display at the visitor center at the Wright Brothers National Memorial.

=== Debate with the Smithsonian ===
The Smithsonian Institution, and primarily its then-secretary Charles Walcott, refused to give credit to the Wright Brothers for the first powered, controlled flight of an aircraft. Instead, they honored the former Smithsonian Secretary Samuel Pierpont Langley, whose 1903 tests of his Aerodrome on the Potomac were not successful. Walcott was a friend of Langley and wanted to see Langley's place in aviation history restored. In 1914, Glenn Curtiss had recently exhausted the appeal process in a patent infringement legal battle with the Wrights. Curtiss sought to prove Langley's machine, which failed piloted tests nine days before the Wrights' successful flight in 1903, capable of controlled, piloted flight in an attempt to invalidate the Wrights' wide-sweeping patents.

The Aerodrome was removed from exhibit at the Smithsonian and prepared for flight at Keuka Lake, New York. Curtiss called the preparations "restoration" claiming that the only addition to the design was pontoons to support testing on the lake but critics including patent attorney Griffith Brewer called them alterations of the original design. Curtiss flew the modified Aerodrome, hopping a few feet off the surface of the lake for 5 seconds at a time.

Between 1916 and 1928, the Wright Flyer was prepared and assembled for exhibition under the supervision of Orville by Wright Company mechanic Jim Jacobs several times. It was briefly exhibited at the Massachusetts Institute of Technology in 1916, the New York Aero Shows in 1917 and 1919, a Society of Automotive Engineers meeting in Dayton, Ohio in 1918, and the National Air Races in Dayton in 1924.

Kitty Hawk was exhibited at the Science Museum, London, from 1928 to 1948.

In 1925, Orville attempted to pressure the Smithsonian by warning that he would send the Flyer to the Science Museum in London if the Institution refused to recognize his and Wilbur's accomplishment. The threat did not achieve its intended effect, and on January 28, 1928, Orville shipped the Kitty Hawk to London for display at the museum. It remained there in "the place of honour", except during World War II when it was moved to an underground storage facility 100 miles (160 km) away, near Corsham.

In 1942, the Smithsonian Institution, under a new secretary, Charles Abbot, published a list of 35 Curtiss modifications to the Aerodrome and a retraction of its long-held claims for the craft. Abbot went on to list four regrets including the role the Institution played in supporting unsuccessful defendants in patent litigation by the Wrights, misinformation about modifications made to the Aerodrome after Wright Flyer's first flight, and public statements attributing the "first aeroplane capable of sustained free flight with a man" to Secretary Langley. The entry in the 1942 Annual Report of Smithsonian Institution begins with the statement "It is everywhere acknowledged that the Wright brothers were the first to make sustained flights in a heavier-than-air machine at Kitty Hawk, North Carolina, on December 17, 1903" and closes with a promise that "Should Dr. Wright decide to deposit the plane ... it would be given the highest place of honor which it is due".

The following year, Orville, after exchanging several letters with Abbot, agreed to return the Flyer to the United States. The Flyer stayed at the Science Museum until a replica could be built, based on the original. This change of heart by the Smithsonian is also mired in controversy – the Flyer was sold to the Smithsonian under several contractual conditions, one of which reads:

Neither the Smithsonian Institution or its successors, nor any museum or other agency, bureau or facilities administered for the United States of America by the Smithsonian Institution or its successors shall publish or permit to be displayed a statement or label in connection with or in respect of any aircraft model or design of earlier date than the Wright Aeroplane of 1903, claiming in effect that such aircraft was capable of carrying a man under its own power in controlled flight.

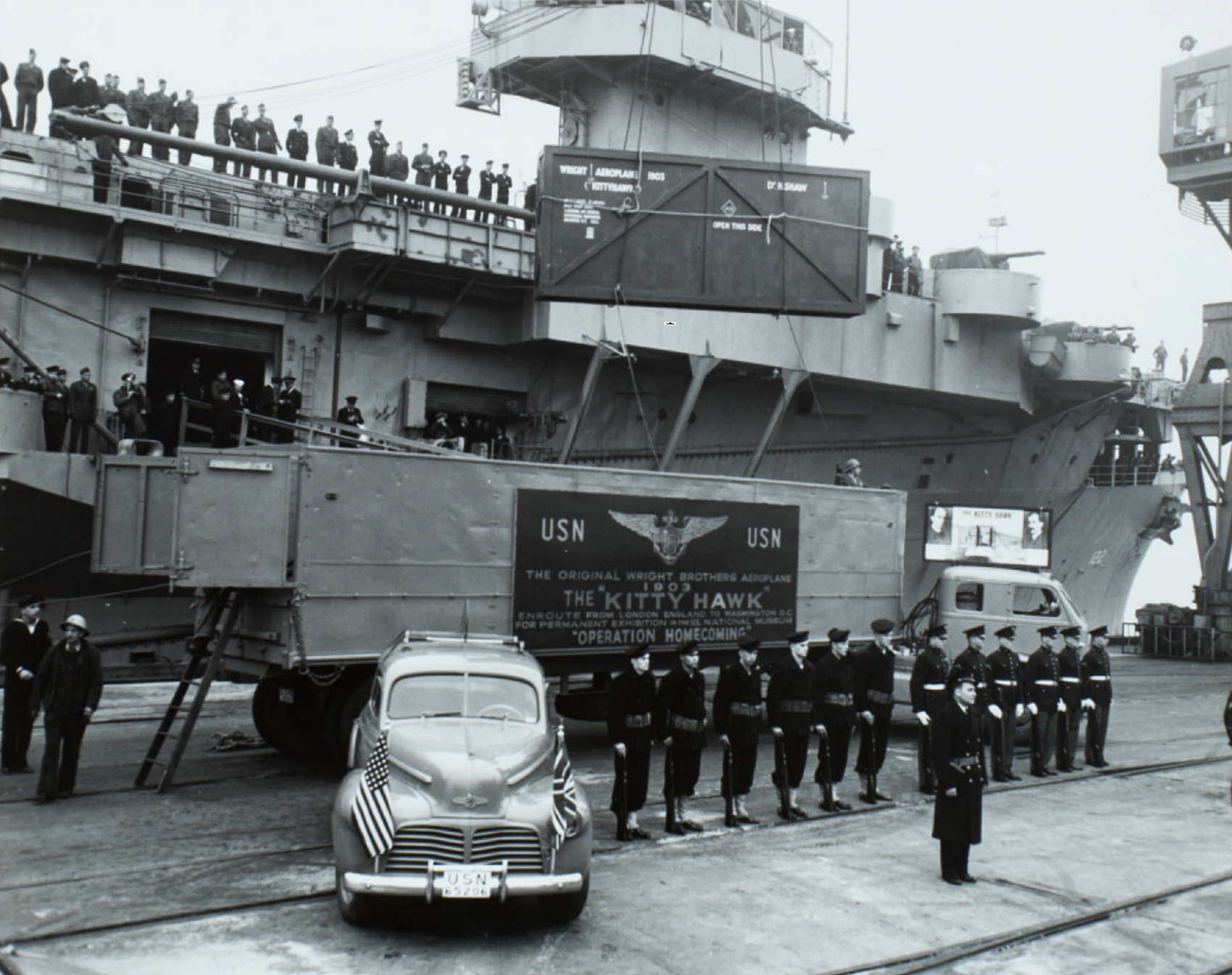
Operation Homecoming, the Kitty Hawk is returned, after 20 years abroad, to its origins in the US, transported by the US Navy aircraft carrier USS Palau.

On October 18, 1948, the official handover of the Kitty Hawk was made to Livingston L. Satterthwaite, the American Civil Air Attaché at a ceremony attended by representatives of the various flying organizations in the UK and by some British aviation pioneers such as Sir Alliott Verdon-Roe.

On November 11, 1948, the Kitty Hawk arrived in North America on board the Mauretania with 1,111 passengers. When the liner docked at Halifax, Nova Scotia, Paul E. Garber of the Smithsonian's National Air Museum met the aircraft and took command of the proceedings, overseeing its transfer to the US Navy aircraft carrier, the USS Palau, which repatriated the aircraft by way of New York Harbor. The rest of the journey to Washington continued on flatbed truck. While in Halifax, Garber met John A. D. McCurdy, at the time the Lieutenant Governor of Nova Scotia. McCurdy as a young man had been a member of Alexander Graham Bell's team Aerial Experiment Association, which included Glenn Curtiss, and later a famous pioneer pilot. During the stay at Halifax, Garber and McCurdy reminisced about the pioneer aviation days and the Wright Brothers. McCurdy also offered Garber any assistance he needed to get the Flyer home.

=== In the Smithsonian ===
Wright Flyer 1985 restoration

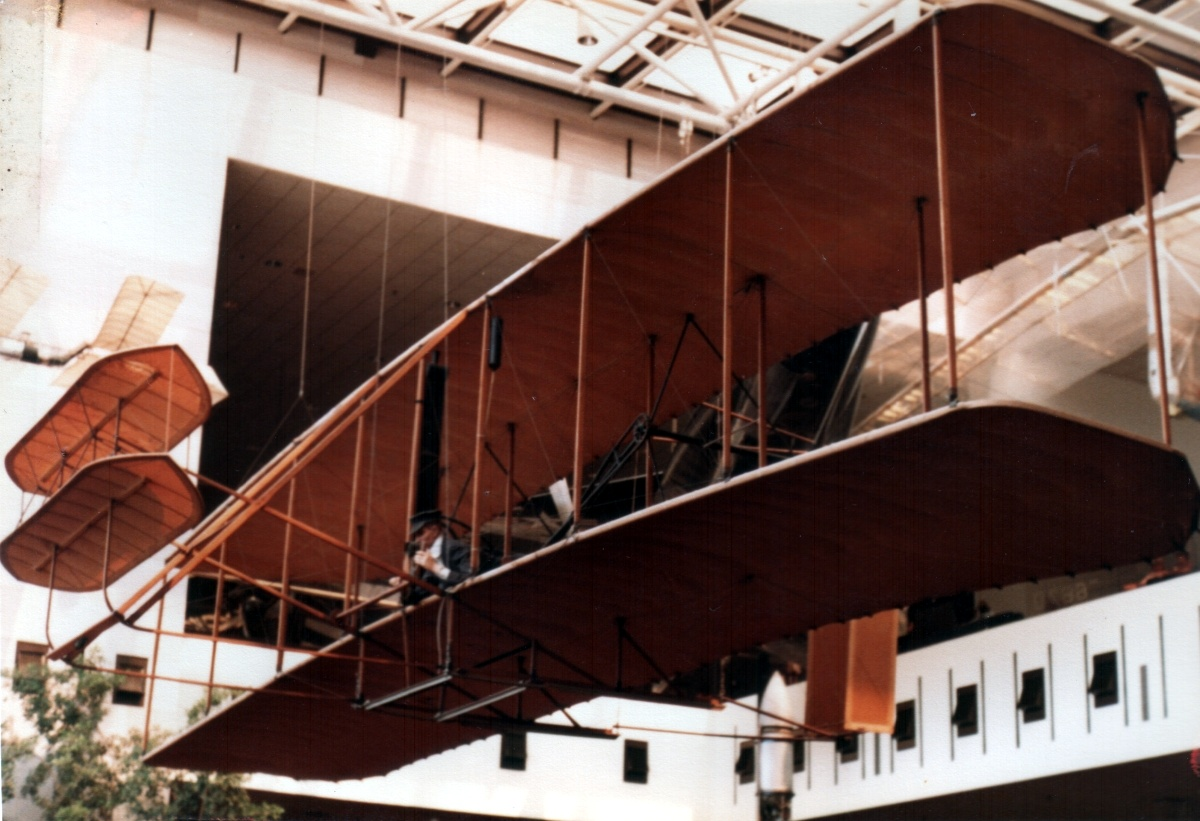
1982 before restoration

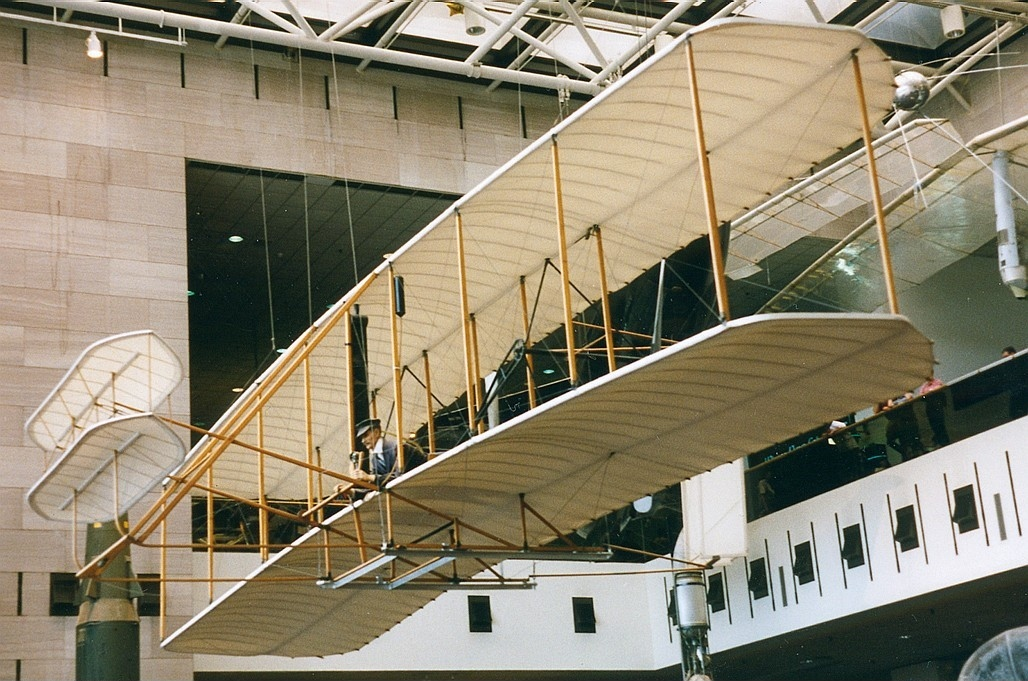
1995 after restoration

The Wright Flyer was put on display in the Arts and Industries Building of the Smithsonian on December 17, 1948, 45 years to the day after the aircraft's only successful flights. (Orville did not live to see this, as he had died that January.) In 1976, it was moved to the Milestones of Flight Gallery of the new National Air and Space Museum. Since 2003 it has resided in a special exhibit in the museum titled "The Wright Brothers and the Invention of the Aerial Age," in recognition of the 100th anniversary of their first flight.

==== 1985 restoration ====
In 1981, discussion began on the need to restore the Wright Flyer from the aging it sustained after many decades on display. During the ceremonies celebrating the 78th anniversary of the first flights, Ivonette Wright Miller (Lorin's daughter), one of the Wright brothers' nieces, presented the Museum with the original covering of one wing of the Flyer, which she had received in her inheritance from Orville. She expressed her wish to see the aircraft restored.

The fabric covering on the aircraft at the time, which came from the 1927 restoration, was discolored and marked with water spots. Metal fasteners holding the wing uprights together had begun to corrode, marking the nearby fabric. Work began in 1985. The restoration was supervised by Senior Curator Robert Mikesh and assisted by Wright Brothers expert Tom Crouch. Museum director Walter J. Boyne decided to perform the restoration in full view of the public.

The wooden framework was cleaned, and corrosion on metal parts removed. The covering was the only part of the aircraft replaced. The new covering was more accurate to the original than that of the 1927 restoration. To preserve the original paint on the engine, the restorers coated it in inert wax before putting on a new coat of paint. The effects of the 1985 restoration were intended to last 75 years (to 2060) before another restoration would be required.

== Reproductions ==
In 1978, 23-year-old Ken Kellett built a replica Wright Flyer in Colorado and flew it at Kitty Hawk on the 75th and 80th anniversaries of the first flight there. Construction took a year and cost $3,000.

As the 100th anniversary on December 17, 2003, approached, the U.S. Centennial of Flight Commission along with other organizations opened bids for companies to recreate the original flight. The Wright Experience, led by Ken Hyde, won the bid and painstakingly recreated reproductions of the original Wright Flyer, plus many of the prototype gliders and kites and subsequent Wright aircraft. The completed Flyer reproduction was brought to Kitty Hawk and pilot Kevin Kochersberger attempted to recreate the original flight at 10:35 on December 17, 2003, on level ground near the bottom of Kill Devil Hill. The aircraft had previously made several successful test flights; however, poor weather, rain, and weak winds prevented a successful flight on the anniversary. Hyde's reproduction is displayed at the Henry Ford Museum in Dearborn, Michigan.

The Los Angeles Section of the American Institute of Aeronautics and Astronautics (AIAA) built a full-scale replica of the 1903 Wright Flyer between 1979 and 1993 using plans from the original Wright Flyer published by the Smithsonian Institution in 1950. Constructed in advance of the 100th anniversary of the Wright Brothers' first flight, the replica was intended for wind tunnel testing to provide a historically accurate aerodynamic database of the Wright Flyer design. The aircraft went on display at the March Field Air Museum in Riverside, California. Numerous static display-only, nonflying reproductions are on display around the United States and across the world, making this perhaps the most reproduced single aircraft of the "pioneer" era in history, rivaling the number of copies – some of which are airworthy – of Louis Blériot's cross-Channel Bleriot XI from 1909.

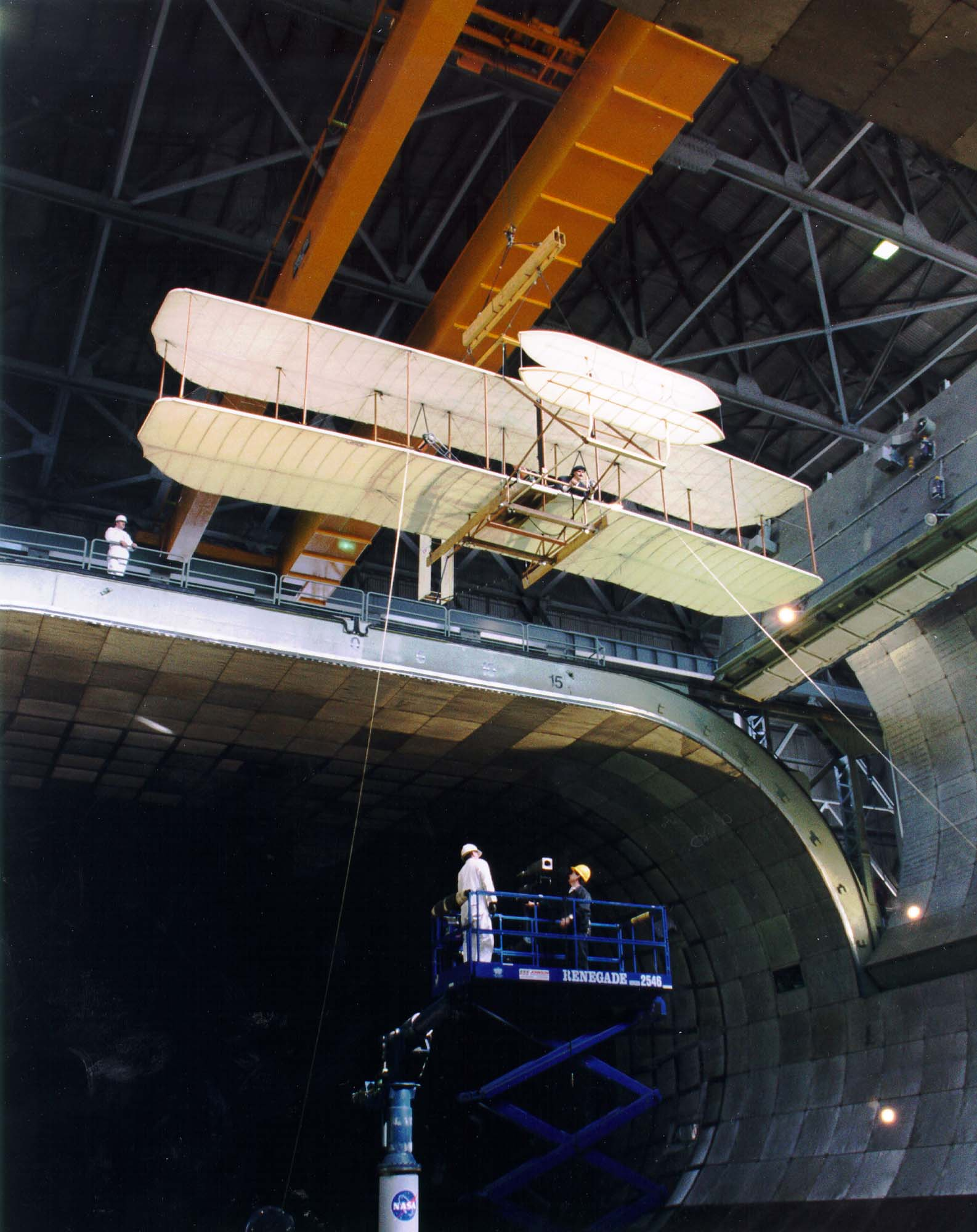
The AIAA's Flyer reproduction undergoing testing in a NASA wind tunnel

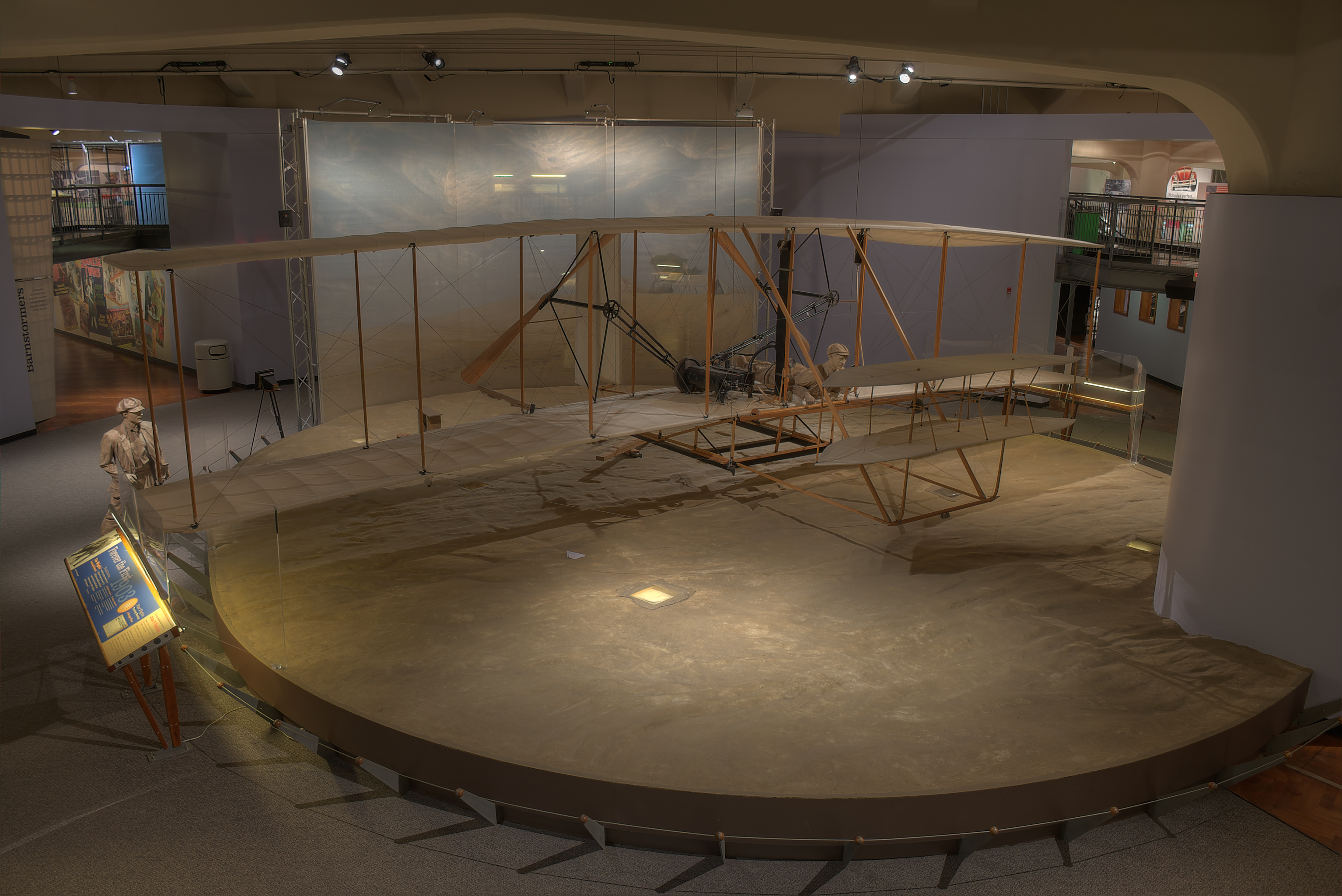
Wright Flyer Replica at the Henry Ford Museum

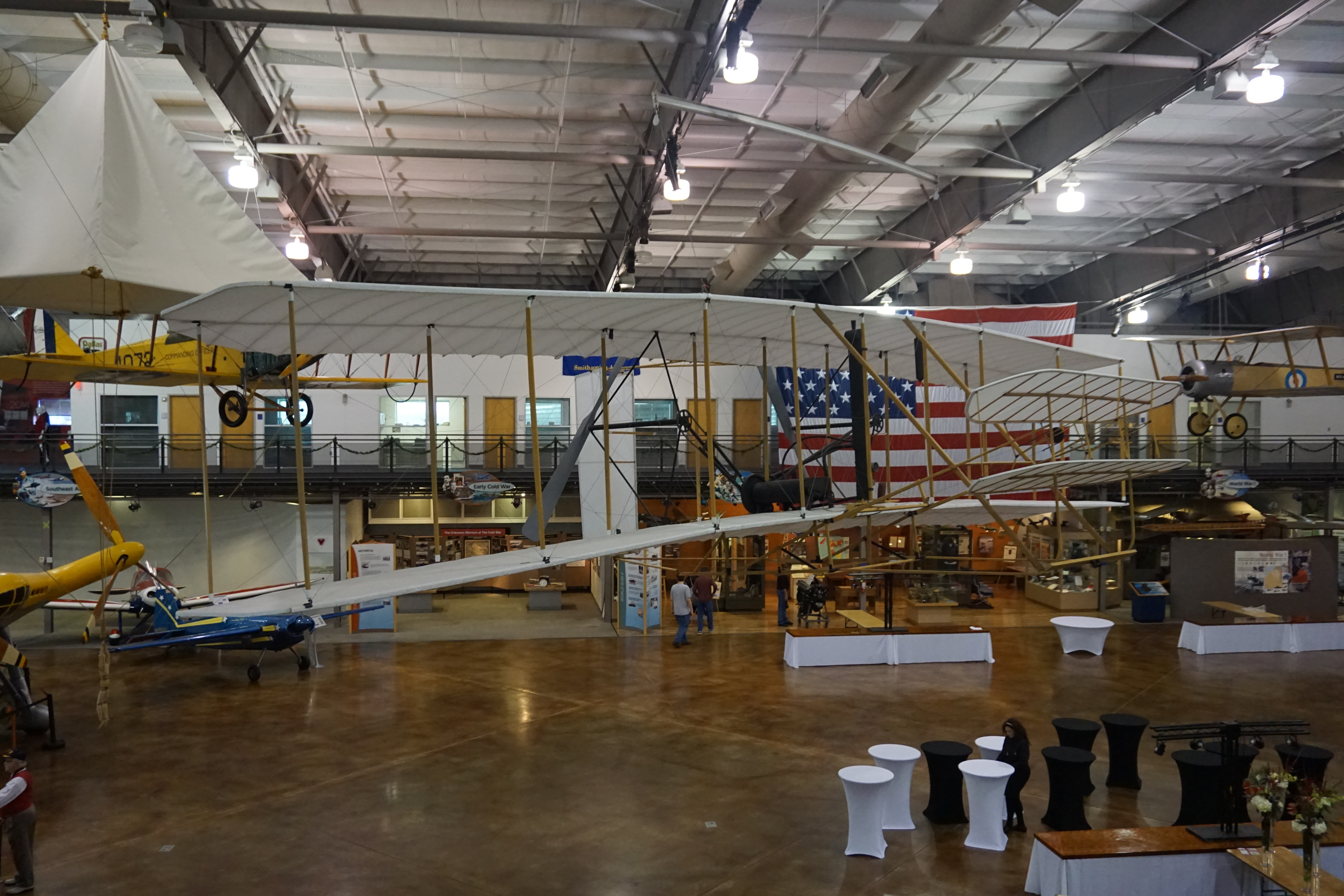
Flyer replica at the Frontiers of Flight Museum

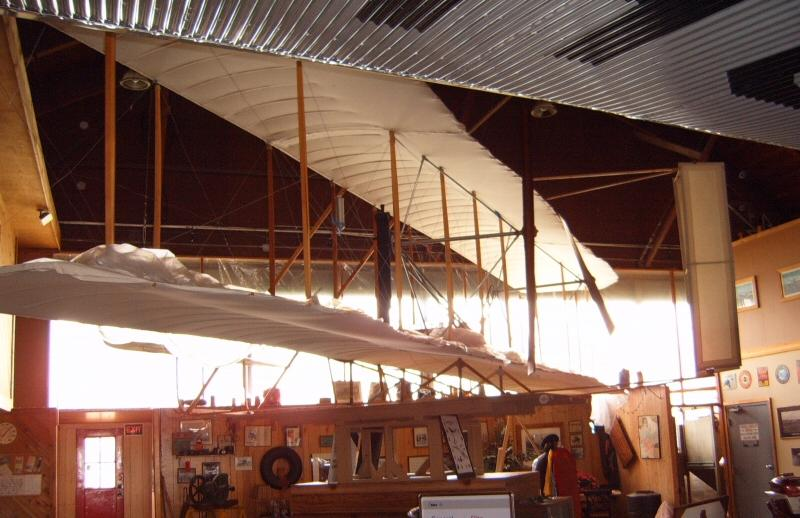
1903 Wright Flyer replica at the Lysdale Historic Hangar

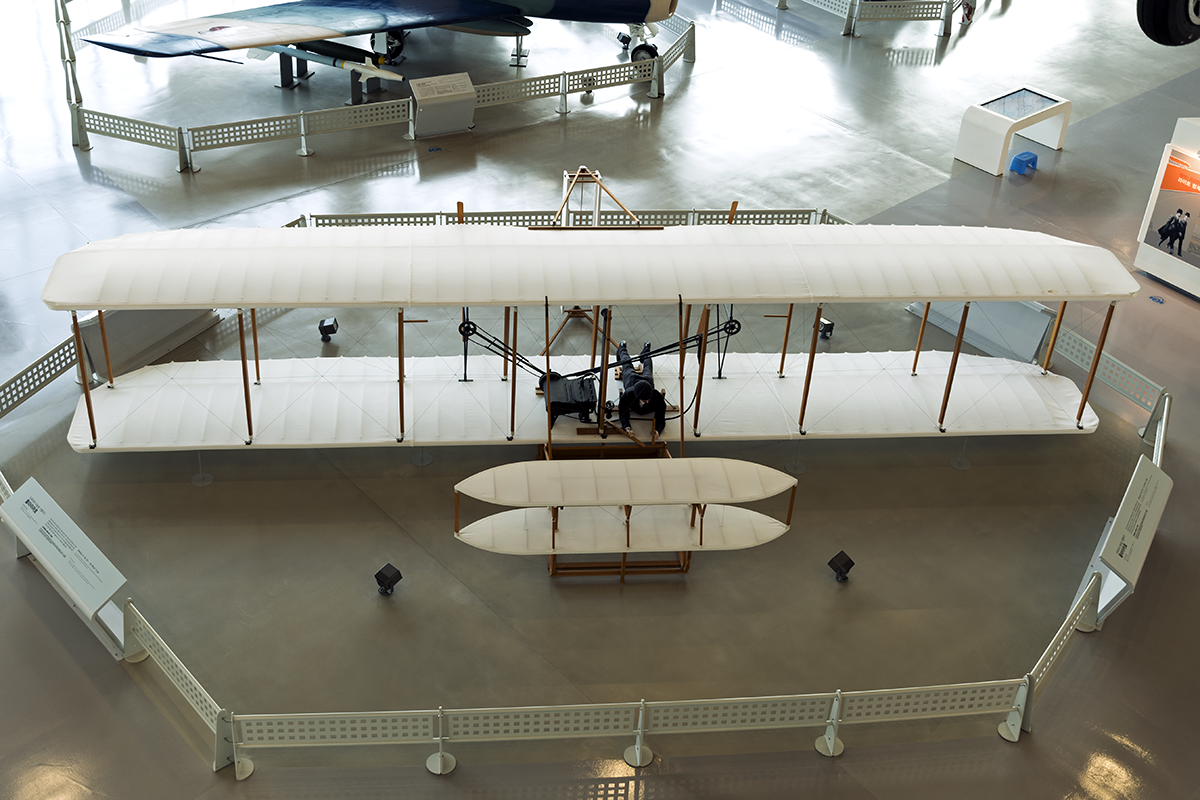
Wright Flyer replica at Jeju Aerospace Museum

== Artifacts ==
In 1969, portions of the original fabric and wood from the Wright Flyer traveled to the Moon and its surface in Neil Armstrong's personal preference kit aboard the Apollo 11 Lunar Module Eagle, and then back to Earth in the Command module Columbia. This artifact is on display at the visitors center at the Wright Brothers National Memorial in Kitty Hawk, North Carolina.

In 1986, separate portions of original wood and fabric, as well as a note by Orville Wright, were taken by North Carolina native astronaut Michael Smith aboard the Space Shuttle Challenger on mission STS-51-L, which was destroyed soon after liftoff. The portions of wood and fabric and Wright's note were recovered from the wreck of the Shuttle and are on display at the North Carolina Museum of History.

A small piece of the Wright Flyer's wing fabric is attached to a cable underneath the solar panel of the helicopter Ingenuity, which became the first vehicle to perform a controlled atmospheric flight on Mars on April 19, 2021. Before moving on for further exploration and testing, Ingenuity's first base on Mars was named Wright Brothers Field.

Another piece of fabric from the Wright Flyer was contributed by the Ohio state government to the official time capsule for the United States Semiquincentennial in Philadelphia. It was buried in 2026, and set to be opened in 2276.

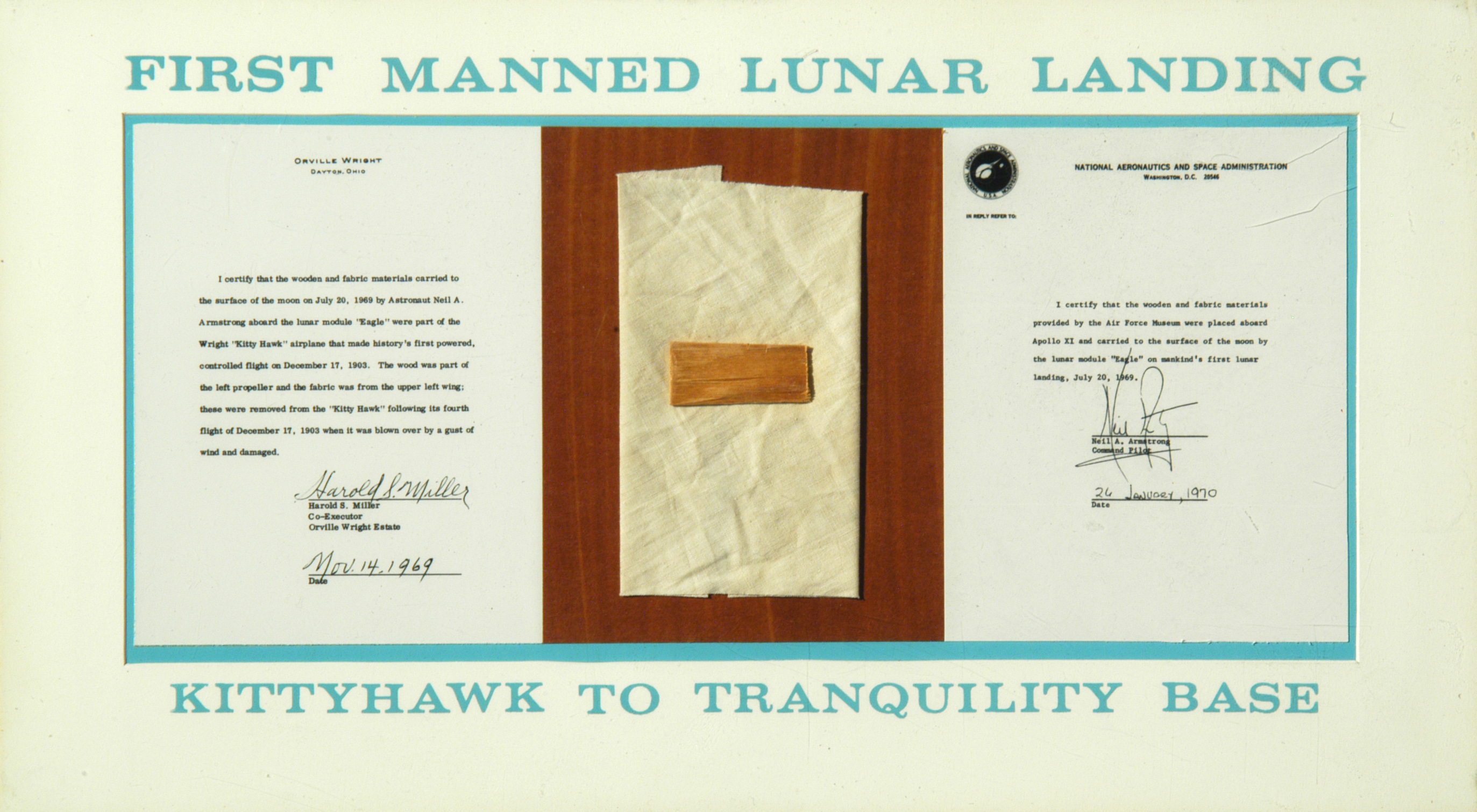
Wright Flyer wood and fabric taken to the Moon in 1969 by Neil Armstrong aboard Apollo 11 and flown to the surface in the Lunar Module Eagle

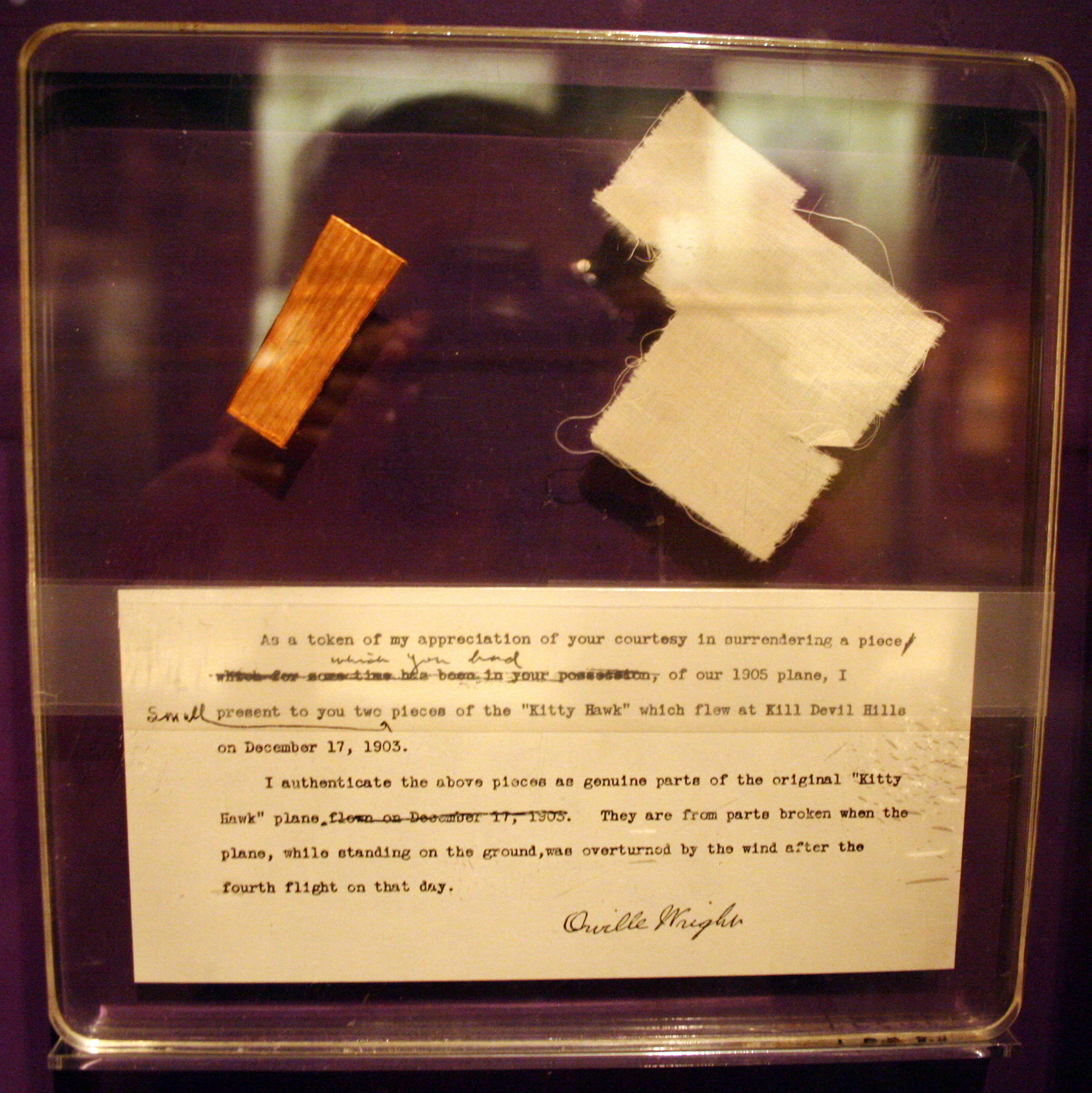
Wright Flyer wood, fabric, and a note by Orville Wright taken aboard and recovered from Space Shuttle Challenger's 1986 flight STS-51-L, which exploded soon after liftoff

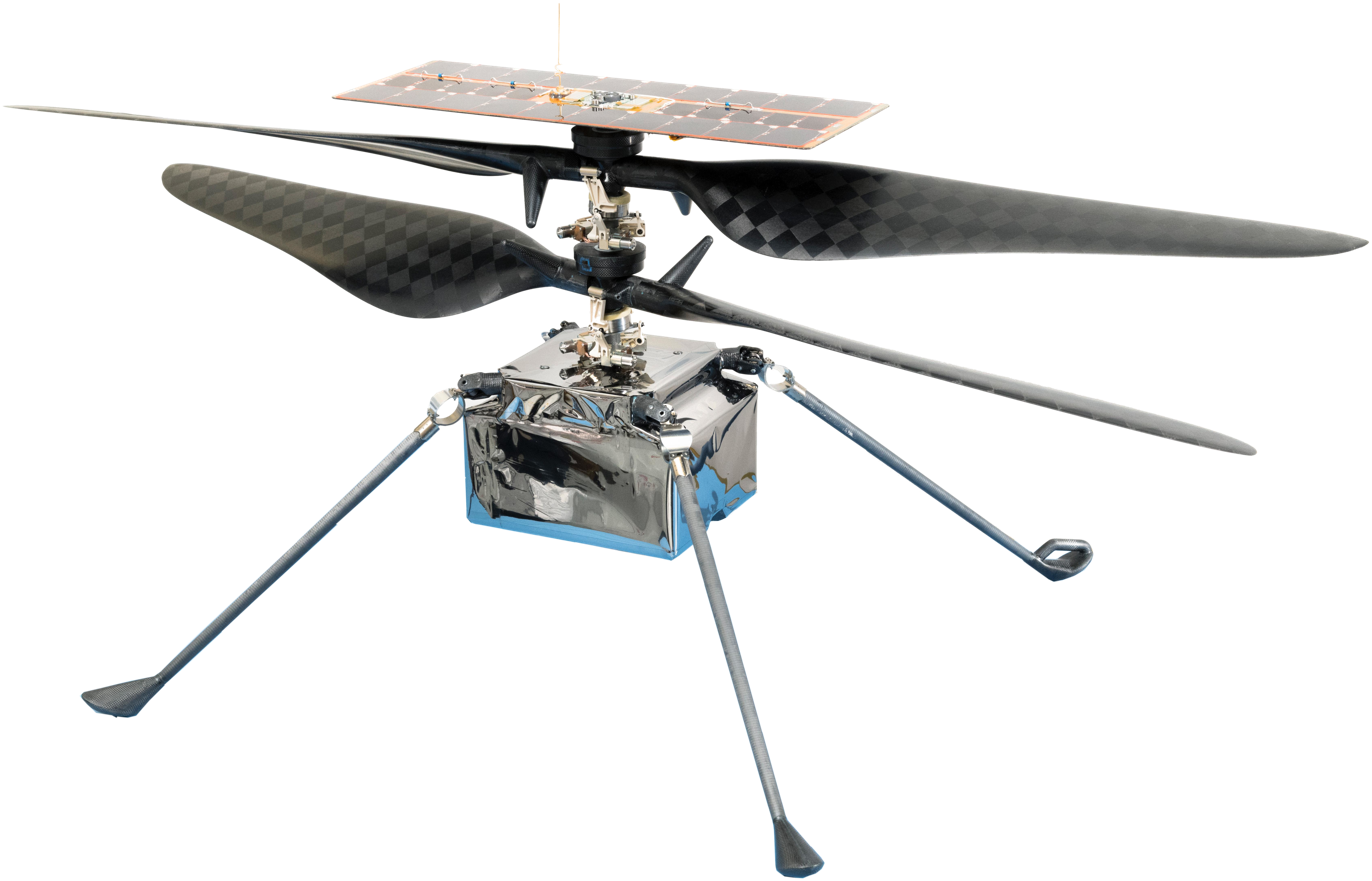
A piece of Wright Flyer's wing fabric is attached to the Ingenuity helicopter, the first powered aircraft to fly on Mars

== Specifications ==
General characteristics

- Crew: 1
- Length: 21 ft 1 in (6.43 m)
- Wingspan: 40 ft 4 in (12.29 m)
- Height: 9 ft 0 in (2.74 m)
- Wing area: 510 sq ft (47 m^{2})
- Empty weight: 605 lb (274 kg)
- Max takeoff weight: 745 lb (338 kg)
- Powerplant: 1 × Wright straight-4 water-cooled 201.1 cu in (3,295 cc) piston engine., 12 hp (8.9 kW)
- Propellers: 2-bladed Wright "Elliptical" props, 8 ft 6 in (2.59 m) diameter

Performance

- Maximum speed: 30 mph (48 km/h, 26 kn)
- Service ceiling: 30 ft (9.1 m)
- Wing loading: 1.4 lb/sq ft (6.4 kg/m^{2})
- Power/mass: 0.02 hp/lb (15 W/kg)

== Commemorations ==
The Wright Brothers and their airplane have been commemorated on a U.S. Quarter and on several U. S. Postage stamps.

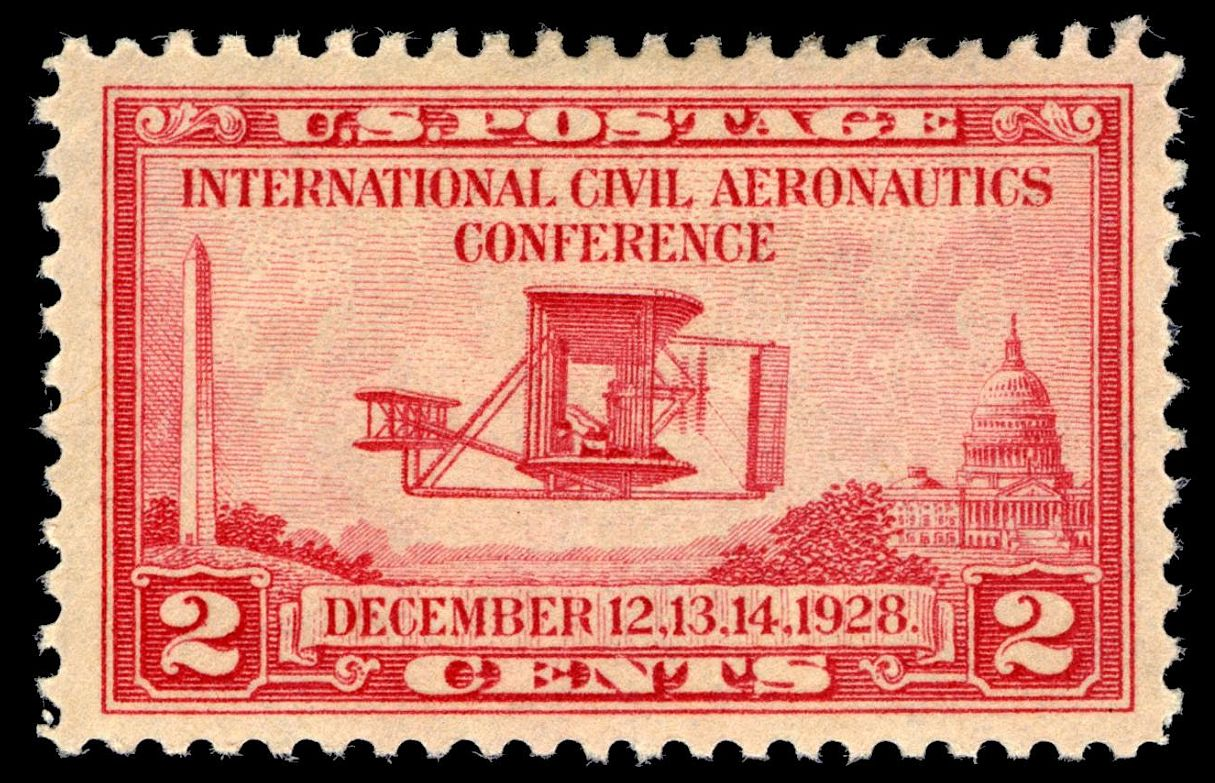
Wright Brothers Airplane, 2c, 1928 issue International Civil Aeronautics Conference

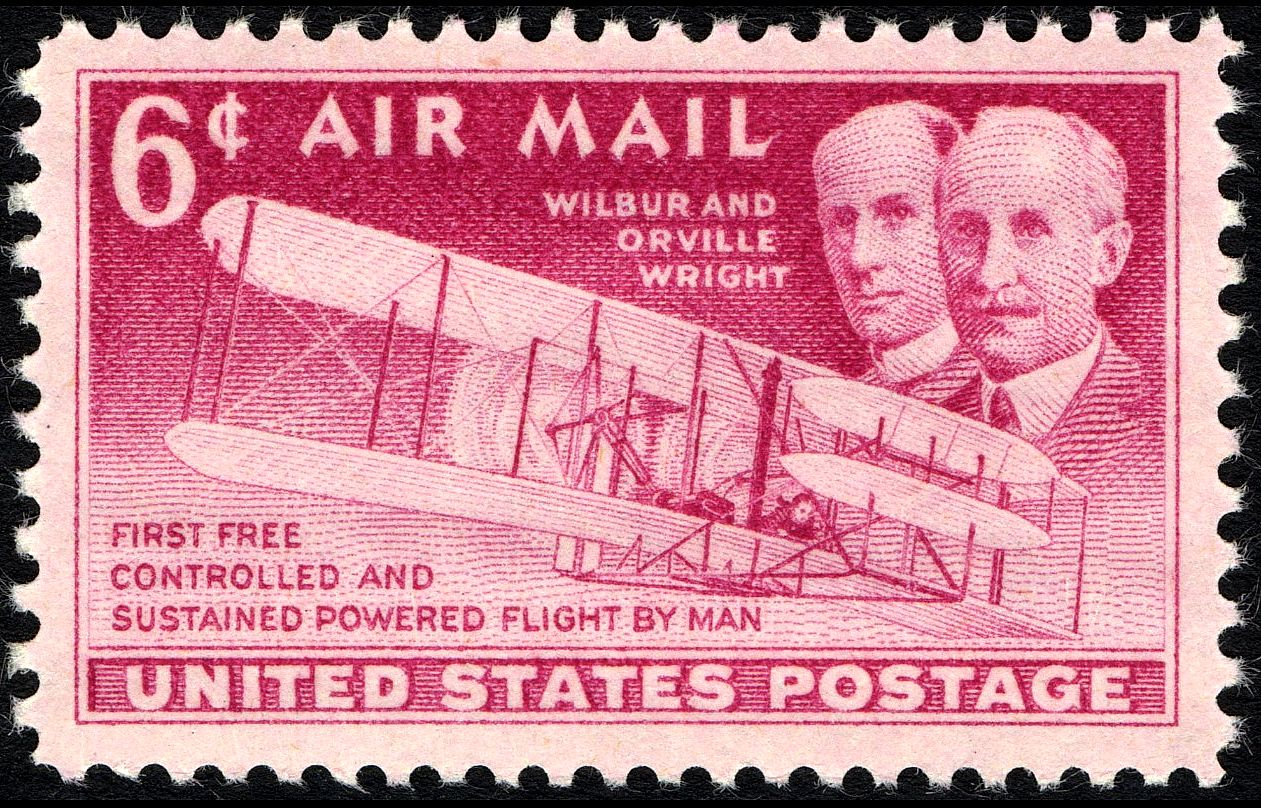
Wilbur and Orville Wright and airplane, 6c airmail, 1949 issue

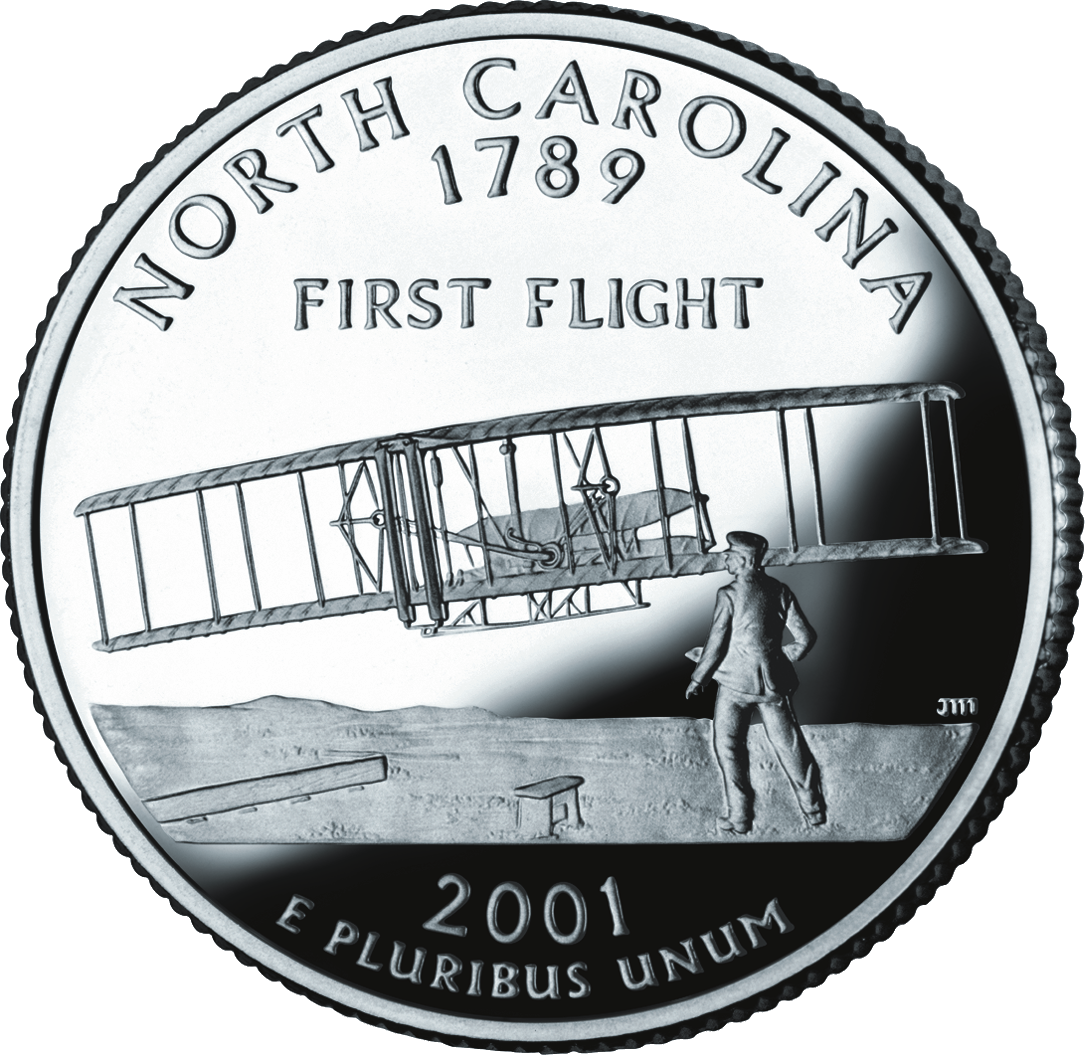
North Carolina 50 State Quarter depicts first flight of 1903.

== See also ==
- Early flying machines
- Claims to the first powered flight
- La France (airship)

Related development

- The Wrights' unpowered gliders
  - 1902 Glider
- Flyer II
- Flyer III
- Wright Model A
- Wright Model B
