= Harold Schoen =

American mathematician

Harold Schoen (born in Fort Recovery, Ohio) is a retired mathematics educator and former college basketball player.

== College basketball career ==
Dr. Schoen played basketball at the University of Dayton from 1960 to 1963. He appeared in 70 games, scored 448 career points (6.4 avg.), and had 352 rebounds. He was starting forward on the 1962 NIT Champion Flyer team that finished with a record of 24-6 and scored 12 points in the final game against St. Johns in Madison Square Garden. He was also captain of the Flyers in his senior year, 1962–63, when he won the team free-throw award (79%) and the scholarship award for being the senior with the highest grade point average.

== Professional life ==
Dr. Schoen is a professor emeritus of mathematics and education at The University of Iowa where he served on the faculty from 1974 to 2005. He received his doctorate from Ohio State University in 1971. He was very active in the National Council of Teachers of Mathematics as a leader and writer of scholarly publications. His professional work has focused on teaching mathematics and mathematics curriculum. Dr. Schoen has authored over 100 scholarly publications as well as 15 textbooks.

In 2015, Dr. Schoen first published his memories of growing up on a small Ohio farm in a family of 13 children through his years at the University of Dayton and winning the 1962 NIT. He writes of family, farm work and play, basketball at the University of Dayton for legendary coach Tom Blackburn, and winning the 1962 NIT. In May 2016, Growing Up was named a Finalist for a Second Generation Indie Book Award. Growing Up is available as a paperback or Kindle e-book.
