= 2007 Sports Network Cup =

Final positions
- Champions: Dayton Flyers
- Runners-up: San Diego Toreros

The 2007 Sports Network Cup was a college football postseason NCAA Division I FCS Mid-Major Championship Trophy. The Dayton Flyers finished ahead of San Diego Toreros 30-0 in first places votes to be named the NCAA Division I FCS Mid-Major Football National Champions.

| Team (First place votes) | Record (W-L) | Points |
|---|---|---|
| Dayton (30) | 11-1 | 300 |
| San Diego | 9-2 | 270 |
| Albany | 8-4 | 239 |
| Morehead State | 7-4 | 203 |
| Iona | 7-4 | 172 |
| Drake | 6-5 | 122 |
| Wagner | 7-4 | 108 |
| Duquesne | 6-4 | 98 |
| Davidson | 6-4 | 74 |
| Central Connecticut State | 6-5 | 55 |

- Dropped out:None.
- Others receiving votes (in order of points):Stony Brook 7, Monmouth 3.
- Note: Voting was conducted by a panel of 112 FCS media members and media relations professionals. A first-place vote is worth five points, a second- place vote is worth four points, a third-place vote is worth three points, a fourth-place vote is worth two points, and a fifth-place vote is worth one point. Votes were due by Wednesday, November 22, 2006, following the final week of the regular season. Postseason play has no effect on the outcome of the awards.
