= World Aircraft Information Files =

- Managing Editor: David Donald
- Categories: Aviation
- Frequency: Weekly
- Publisher: Stan Morse
- First issue: 1997
- Final issue Number: 2002; 218
- Company: Bright Star Publishing
- Country: United Kingdom
- Language: English
- Website: Official Website
- ISSN: 1369-6483

World Aircraft Information Files (WAIF) is a weekly partwork magazine published by Bright Star Publications (part of Midsummer Books) in the United Kingdom. Each issue was priced at £1.70 for issues 1–163, and £1.80 for issues 164–218. Altogether, there were 218 issues in the complete set, which completed in 2002. Originally advertised as having 200 issues, the run was extended to 218 issues when approximately 576 pages were missing from the collection. An index to the complete series was given in the final issue.

== Overview ==
Published in 218 weekly parts, each issue comprised 32 pages, the same large page size as World Airpower Journal and Wings of Fame. The pages were organised as a series of pull-out reference files to be slotted into ring binders. There were 1,041 file subjects – although there were only 1008 numbered files. During the production of the partwork, the publishers realised that some aeroplanes and airlines were missed from the index, necessitating additions. Hence, 'missing' files were numbered by adding the prefix "a" (and "b", "c" or "d" where necessary) after the previous file number – for example, between Files 591 (Air Niugini) and 592 (Air Transat) is 591a (Air Seychelles).

== Subject coverage ==
The subjects covered are grouped into 14 categories as follows:

World Military Aircraft Files 1–290 (294 files)
File	Title
001	Aeritalia G.91
002	Aermacchi MB.326/MB.339
003	Aero L-39 Albatross
004	Aérospatiale Alouette family
005	Aérospatiale SA 321 Super Frelon
006	Aérospatiale/Eurocopter Puma/Super Puma/Cougar
007	Aérospatiale SA 341 Gazelle
008	Aichi D3A 'Val'
009	Albatros D series
010	AMX International AMX
011	AIDC Ching Kuo
012	Airco DH.4/DH.9/DH.9A
013	Alenia G.222 and C-27
014	Antonov An-12 'Cub'
015	Antonov An-26 'Curl'/An-30 'Clank'/An-32 'Cline'
016	Arado Ar 196
017	Arado Ar 234
018	Armstrong Whitworth Siskin
019	Armstrong Whitworth Whitley
020	Atlas Cheetah
021	Avro Lancaster
022	Avro Lincoln
023	Avro Shackleton
024	Avro Vulcan
025	Beech (Raytheon) C-12
026	Bell AH-1 Hueycobra
027	Bell UH-1 Iroquois
028	Bell 212/412
029	Bell P-39 Airacobra/P-63 Kingcobra
030	Bell Boeing V-22 Osprey
031	Blackburn Buccaneer
032	Blohm & Voss BV 138
033	Boeing B-17 Flying Fortress
034	Boeing B-29 Superfortress
035	Boeing B-47 Stratojet
036	Boeing B-52 Stratofortress
037	Boeing C-97/KC-97
038	Boeing C-135 Stratotanker family
039	Boeing E-3 Sentry
040	Boeing E-4
041	Boeing C-137 and C-18
042	Boeing PW-9/P-12/FB/F2B/F3B/F4B
043	Boeing P-26 Peashooter
043a	Boeing X-32
044	Boeing CH-47 Chinook
045	Boeing-Vertol H-46 Sea Knight
046	Boeing/Sikorsky RAH-66 Comanche
047	Breguet 14
048	Breguet Bre.19
049	Breguet Br.1050 Alizé
050	Breguet/Dassault Atlantic/Atlantique 2
051	Bristol Beaufighter
052	Bristol Beaufort
053	Bristol Blenheim
054	Bristol Bulldog
055	Bristol F2A/F2B Fighter
056	British Aerospace Hawk
057	British Aerospace Nimrod
058	British Aerospace Sea Harrier
059	CASA C.101 Aviojet
060	Cessna T-37/A-37 Dragonfly
061	Consolidated B-24 Liberator
062	Consolidated PBY Catalina
063	Convair B-36 Peacemaker
064	Convair B-58 Hustler
065	Convair F-102 Delta Dagger
066	Convair F-106 Delta Dart
067	Curtiss C-46 Commando
068	Curtiss Model 75/P-36 Hawk
069	Curtiss P-40 Warhawk family
070	Curtiss Hawk family
071	Curtiss SB2C Helldiver
072	Dassault Etendard/Super Etendard
073	Dassault Mirage III
073a	Dassault Mirage IV
074	Dassault F1 Mirage
075	Dassault Mirage 2000
076	Dassault Ouragan/Mystère
077	Dassault Rafale
078	Dassault/Dornier Alpha Jet
079	de Havilland DH.98 Mosquito
080	de Havilland DH.100 Vampire
081	de Havilland DH.103 Hornet
082	de Havilland DH.110 Sea Vixen
083	de Havilland DH.112 Venom
084	Dewoitine D.520
085	Dornier Do 17/Dornier Do 215
086	Dornier Do 217
087	Douglas AD/A-1 Skyraider
088	Douglas A3D/A-3 Skywarrior
089	Douglas A-4 Skyhawk
090	Douglas DB-7/A-20/P-70 Havoc/Boston
091	Douglas A-26 Invader
092	Douglas B-66 Destroyer
093	Douglas C-47 Skytrain
094	Douglas C-74/C-124
095	Douglas C-133 Cargomaster
096	Douglas F4D Skyray
097	Douglas SBD Dauntless
098	EH Industries EH 101
099	EMBRAER EMB-312 Tucano
100	English Electric Canberra
101	English Electric Lightning
102	Eurocopter Tiger
103	Eurofighter 2000/Typhoon
104	Fairchild A-10 Thunderbolt II
105	Fairey Barracuda
106	Fairey Firefly
107	Fairey Gannet
108	Fairey Swordfish
109	Fiat CR.32
110	Fiat CR.42 Falco
111	Fieseler Fi 156 Storch
112	FMA IA-58 Pucará
113	Focke-Wulf Fw 189 Uhu
114	Focke-Wulf Fw 190
115	Focke-Wulf Fw 200 Condor
116	Fokker D.VII
117	Fokker Dr.I
118	Fokker E series
119	Folland Gnat
120	Fouga CM.170 Magister
121	General Dynamics F-111/EF-111 Raven
122	Gloster Gladiator
123	Gloster Javelin
124	Gloster Meteor
125	Grumman A-6 Intruder/EA-6 Intruder
126	Northrop Grumman E-2 Hawkeye
127	Grumman F2F/F3F
128	Grumman F4F/FM Wildcat
129	Grumman F6F Hellcat
130	Grumman F7F Tigercat
131	Grumman F8F Bearcat
132	Grumman F9F Panther/F-9 Cougar
133	Grumman F-14 Tomcat
134	Grumman OV-1/RV-1 Mohawk
135	Grumman S-2 Tracker
136	Grumman TBF Avenger
137	Handley Page O/400
138	Handley Page Halifax
139	Handley Page Hampden/Hereford
140	Handley Page Victor
141	Hawker Fury
142	Hawker Hart family
143	Hawker Hunter
144	Hawker Hurricane
145	Hawker Sea Fury
146	Hawker Sea Hawk
147	Hawker Typhoon
148	Hawker Siddeley Harrier
149	Heinkel He 111
150	Heinkel He 162 'Salamander'
151	Heinkel He 177 Greif
152	Heinkel He 219 Uhu
153	Henschel Hs 123
154	Henschel Hs 129
155	Hughes OH-6 Cayuse/Model 500 Defender
156	IAI Kfir
157	Ilyushin Il-2 'Bark'/Il-10 'Beast'
158	Ilyushin Il-28 'Beagle'
159	Ilyushin Il-76/Il-78 &A-50
160	Junkers Ju 52/3m
161	Junkers Ju 87
162	Junkers Ju 88
163	Junkers Ju 90/290
164	Junkers Ju 188
165	Kaman SH-2 Seasprite
166	Kamov Ka-25/Ka-27
167	Kamov Ka-50/52 'Hokum'
168	Kawanishi H8K 'Emily'
169	Kawasaki Ki-61 Hien
170	Lavochkin La-5/7
171	Lockheed C-5 Galaxy
172	Lockheed C-130 Hercules
173	Lockheed C-141 Starlifter
174	Lockheed F-94
175	Lockheed F-104 Starfighter
176	Lockheed F-117 Nighthawk
177	Lockheed Hudson
178	Lockheed P2V Neptune
179	Lockheed P-3 Orion
180	Lockheed P-38 Lightning
181	Lockheed P-80 Shooting Star
182	Lockheed S-3 Viking
183	Lockheed SR-71 Blackbird
184	Lockheed T-33/T2V
185	Lockheed U-2
186	Lockheed Martin F-16 Fighting Falcon
187	Lockheed Martin F-22 Raptor
187a	Lockheed Martin X-35
188	Macchi MC.200 Saetta/202 Folgore/205 Veltro
189	Martin B-26 Marauder
190	Martin B-57 Canberra
191	McDonnell F-101 Voodoo
192	Boeing (McDonnell Douglas) C-17 Globemaster III
193	McDonnell-Douglas F-4 Phantom II
194	McDonnell-Douglas F-15 Eagle
195	McDonnell-Douglas F/A-18 Hornet
196	McDonnell-Douglas KC-10 Extender
197	McDonnell-Douglas AH-64 Apache
198	McDonnell-Douglas Harrier II/BAe Harrier II
199	Messerschmitt Bf 109
200	Messerschmitt Bf 110
201	Messerschmitt Me 163
202	Messerschmitt Me 262 Schwalbe
203	Messerschmitt Me 321/323 Gigant
204	Messerschmitt Me 210/410
205	Mikoyan-Gurevich MiG-1/MiG-3
206	Mikoyan-Gurevich MiG-15 'Fagot'
207	Mikoyan-Gurevich MiG-17 'Fresco'
208	Mikoyan-Gurevich MiG-19 'Farmer'
209	Mikoyan-Gurevich MiG-21 'Fishbed'
210	Mikoyan MiG-23/27 'Flogger'
211	Mikoyan MiG-25 'Foxbat'
212	Mikoyan MiG-29 'Fulcrum'
213	Mikoyan MiG-31 'Foxhound'
214	Mil Mi-8/9 Hip/14 'Haze'/17 'Hip'
215	Mil Mi-24/25/35 'Hind'
216	Mil Mi-28 'Havoc'
217	Mitsubishi A5M 'Claude'
218	Mitsubishi A6M Reisen 'Zeke'
219	Mitsubishi F-1/T-2
220	Mitsubishi G4M 'Betty'
221	Morane-Saulnier MS.406
222	Nakajima B5N 'Kate'/B6N 'Jill'
223	Nakajima Ki-43 Hayabusa
224	Nakajima Ki-84 Hayate
225	Nieuport Scouts
226	North American (Rockwell) A3J/A-5 Vigilante
227	North American B-25 Mitchell
228	North American F-86 Sabre
229	North American F-100 Super Sabre
229a	North American FJ Fury
230	North American OV-10 Bronco
231	North American P-51 Mustang
232	North American T-6 family
233	Northrop F-5 family
234	Northrop P-61 Black Widow
235	Northrop Grumman B-2 Spirit
236	Panavia Tornado
237	Petlyakov Pe-2
238	Polikarpov I-15/I-152/I-153
239	Polikarpov I-16
240	Republic F-84
241	Republic F-105 Thunderchief
242	Republic P-47 Thunderbolt
243	Rockwell B-1
244	Rockwell T2J/T-2 Buckeye
245	Royal Aircraft Factory BE.2
246	Royal Aircraft Factory SE.5
247	Saab Draken
248	Saab 37 Viggen
249	Saab JAS 39 Gripen
250	Savoia-Marchetti SM.79 Sparviero
251	SEPECAT Jaguar
252	ShinMaywa PS-1/US-1A
253	Short Stirling
254	Short Sunderland
255	Sikorsky Sea King/Westland Sea King
256	Sikorsky H-19/Westland Whirlwind
257	Sikorsky S-58
258	Sikorsky H-53
259	Sikorsky H-60 Black Hawk/Seahawk
260	Sopwith F.1 Camel
261	Sopwith Pup
262	Sopwith Snipe
263	SPAD VII/SPAD XIII
264	Sud-Ouest Vautour
265	Sukhoi Su-7 'Fitter'
266	Sukhoi Su-9/Sukhoi Su-11/Sukhoi Su-15
267	Sukhoi Su-17/Sukhoi Su-20/Sukhoi Su-22 'Fitter'
268	Sukhoi Su-24 'Fencer'
269	Sukhoi Su-25 'Frogfoot'
270	Sukhoi Su-27 'Flanker'
271	Supermarine Spitfire
272	Transall C.160
273	Tupolev Tu-2
274	Tupolev Tu-16 'Badger'
275	Tupolev Tu-22/22M
276	Tupolev Tu-95/Tu-142 'Bear'
277	Tupolev Tu-160 'Blackjack'
278	Vickers Valiant
279	Vickers VC10
280	Vickers Vimy
281	Vickers Wellington
282	Vought A-7 Corsair II
283	Vought F4U Corsair
284	Vought F8U/F-8 Crusader
285	Westland Lynx
286	Westland Lysander
287	Westland Wyvern
288	Yakovlev Yak-1, 3, 7 & 9
289	Yakovlev Yak-25/27/28
290	Yakovlev Yak-38 'Forger'

Aircraft Weapons and Technology Files 291–325 (35 files)
File	Title
291	Airbourne Early Warning [sic?]
292	Basic Fighter Manoeuvres
293	Air Defence
294	Air-to-air Gunnery
295	Air-to-air Missiles
296	Air-to-ground bombing
297	Air-to-ground missiles
298	Air-to-ground Rockets
299	Anti-armour Weapons
300	Anti-ship Missiles
301	Assault Helicopters
302	ASW Aircraft
303	ASW Helicopters
304	Attack Helicopters
305	Battlefield Reconnaissance
306	Close Support
307	Cluster Bombs and Dispensers
308	Combat Search and Rescue
309	Dumb Bombs
310	Electronic Warfare
311	Forward Air Control
312	Inflight Refuelling
313	Interdiction
314	SAM Killers
315	Long-range Interception
316	Countermeasures
317	Maritime Recce
318	Nuclear Bombs
319	Laser-Guided Bombs
320	Special Forces
321	Stand-off Missiles
322	Strategic Airlift
323	Strategic Reconnaissance
324	Tactical Airlift
325	Tactical Reconnaissance

Air Forces of the World – see also List of air forces Files 326–345 (20 files)
File	Title
326	Western Europe — Austria: Österreichische Luftstreitkräfte (Austrian Air Force) — Belgium: Belgische Luchtmacht, Composante Air (Belgian Air Component) — Denmark: Flyvevåbnet (Royal Danish Air Force), Søværnets Helikoptertjeneste (Royal Danish Navy Helicopter Service) — Finland: Finnish: Ilmavoimat, Swedish: Flygvapnet (Finnish Air Force), Finnish: Suomen maavoimat – Helikopteripataljoona, Swedish: Finländska armén – Helikopterbataljonen (Finnish Army Aviation Wing), Finnish: Rajavartiolaitos, Swedish: Gränsbevakningsväsendet (Finnish Border Guard) — France: Armée de l'Air (French Air Force), Aviation navale (French Naval Aviation), Aviation Légère de l’Armée de Terre, ALAT (French Army Light Aviation) — Germany: Luftwaffe (German Air Force), Marineflieger (German Navy Flight), Heeresfliegertruppe (German Army Aviators Corps) — NATO: Allied Air Forces Central Europe — Netherlands: Koninklijke Luchtmacht (KLu) (Royal Netherlands Air Force), Marine-Luchtvaartdienst (MLD) (Netherlands Naval Aviation Service) — Norway: Kongelige Norske Luftforsvaret (Royal Norwegian Air Force) — Republic of Ireland: Aer Chór na hÉireann (Irish Air Corps) — Sweden: Svenska Flygvapnet (Swedish Air Force), Försvarsmaktens helikopterflottilj (Swedish Armed Forces Helicopter Wing) — Switzerland: German: Schweizer Luftwaffe; French: Forces aériennes suisses; Italian: Forze Aeree Svizzere (Swiss Air Force) — United Kingdom: Royal Air Force, Fleet Air Arm, Army Air Corps
327	Central Europe — Albania: Forcat Ajrore Shqiptare (Albanian Air Force) — Bosnia: Zrakoplovstvo i PZO Bosne i Hercegovine – Ваздухопловство и ПВО Боснe и Херцеговинe (Air Force and Anti-Aircraft Defense) — Bulgaria: Военновъздушни сили, ВВС (Bulgarian Air Force) — Croatia: Hrvatsko ratno zrakoplovstvo i protuzračna obrana (Croatian Air Force and Defense) — Czech Republic: Vzdušné síly Armády České republiky (Czech Air Force) — Hungary: Magyar Légierő (Hungarian Air Force), Vörös Légjárócsapat (Red Hungarian Air Corps) — Macedonia: Воено Воздухопловство на Република Македонија – Voeno vozduhoplovstvo na Republika Makedonija (Macedonian Air Force) — Poland: Siły Powietrzne Rzeczypospolitej Polskiej (Siły Powietrzne RP) (Polish Air Force), Lotnictwo Wojsk Lądowych (Polish Army Aviation), Lotnictwo Marynarki Wojennej (Polish Naval Aviation), Lotnictwo Straży Granicznej (Polish Border Guard) — Romania: Forţele Aeriene Române (Romanian Air Force) — Slovak Republic: Slovak Air Force — Slovenia: Brigada zračne Obrambe in Letalstva Slovenske Vojske (Slovenian Air Force and Air Defence) — Yugoslavia: Federal Republic of Yugoslavia: Ратно ваздухопловство и противваздушна одбрана (Air Force of the Federal Republic of Yugoslavia/Serbia and Montenegro) (defunct); Serbia: Ваздухопловство и противваздушна одбрана – В и ПВО or Vazduhoplovstvo i protivvazdušna odbrana – V i PVO (Serbian Air Force and Air Defense); Kosovo: Military of Kosovo; Montenegro: Vazdušne snage Crne Gore (Military of Montenegro Aircraft)
328	Southern Europe and Mediterranean — Greece: Πολεμική Αεροπορία (ΠΑ) – Polemikí Aeroporía (Hellenic Air Force), Αεροπορία Στρατού – Aeroporia Stratou (Hellenic Army Aviation Wing), Πολεμικό Ναυτικό – Polemiko Navtiko (Hellenic Navy Aviation Wing), Λιμενικό Σώμα – Limeniko Soma (Hellenic Coast Guard) — Italy: Aeronautica Militare (Italian Air Force), Aviazione Navale (Italian Naval Aviation), Cavalleria dell'Aria (Italian Army Aviation), Nucleo Elicotteri Carabinieri (Helicopter Service of the Carabinieers) — Portugal: Força Aérea Portuguesa, FAP (Portuguese Air Force), Aviação Naval Portuguesa (Portuguese Naval Aviation) — Spain: Ejército del Aire (Spanish Air Force), Fuerzas Aeromóviles del Ejército de Tierra (Spanish Army Airmobile Force), Armada Española Arma Aérea (Spanish Navy Air Arm) — Turkey: Türk Hava Kuvvetleri (Turkish Air Force), Türk Kara Kuvvetleri Havacılığı (Turkish Land Force Aviation), Türk Donanma Havacılığı (Turkish Naval Aviation), Türk Sahil Güvenlik Havacılığı (Turkish Coast Guard Aviation)
329	Former Soviet Union — Azerbaijan: Azərbaycan hərbi hava qüvvələri (Azerbaijani Air Force) — Belarus: Belarusian Air Force — Estonia: Õhuvägi (Estonian Air Force) — Georgia: საქართველოს სამხედრო-საჰაერო ძალები – sak’art’velos samxedro-sahaero dzalebi (Georgian Air Force) — Kazakhstan: Sil Vozdushnoy Oborony Respubliki Kazakhstan (Kazakhstan Air and Air Defense Forces) — Kyrgyzstan: Kyrgyzstan Air Force — Latvia: Latvijas Gaisa spēki (Latvian Air Force) — Lithuania: Lietuvos karinės oro pajėgos (LKOP) (Lithuanian Air Force) — Moldova: Moldovan Air Force — Russia: Военно-воздушные cилы России – Voyenno-vozdushnye sily Rossii (Russian Air Force), Авиация Военно-морского флота – Aviatsiya Voenno-morskogo Flota (Russian Naval Aviation) — Tajikistan: Tajikistan Air and Air Defense Troops — Turkmenistan: Turkmenistan Air Force and Air Defense Force — Ukraine: Повітряні Сили України – Povitryani Syly Ukrayiny (Ukrainian Air Force), Морська Авіація – Morska Aviatsiya (Ukrainian Naval Aviation) — Uzbekistan: Uzbek Air and Air Defense Force
330	Middle East — Bahrain: Royal Bahraini Air Force — Iran: یروی هوایی ارتش جمهوری اسلامی ایران (Islamic Republic of Iran Air Force), Islamic Republic of Iran Army, Islamic Republic of Iran Navy Aviation, Air Force of the Army of the Guardians of the Islamic Revolution — Iraq: Al Quwwa al Jawwiya al Iraqiya – القوة الجوية العراقية (Iraqi Air Force) — Israel: זרוע האויר והחלל – Zroa HaAvir VeHahalal (Israeli Air Force) — Jordan: سلاح الجو الملكي الأردني – Al Quwwat al-Jawwiya Almalakiya al-Urduniya Royal Jordanian Air Force) — Kuwait: al-Quwwat al-Jawwiya al-Kuwaitiya (Kuwait Air Force) — Lebanon: القوات الجوية اللبنانية – Al Quwwat al-Jawwiya al-Lubnania (Lebanese Air Force) — Oman: Al Quwwat al-Jawwiya al-Sultanya al-Omanya (Royal Air Force of Oman) — Palestine: None – as of 2000, 6 aircraft in use using civilian markings; — Qatar: Qatar Emiri Air Force — Saudi Arabia: القوات الجوية الملكية السعودية – Al Quwwat al Jawwiya al Malakhiah as Sa'udiya (Royal Saudi Air Force) — Syria: القوّات الجوية العربية السورية – Al Quwwat al-Jawwiya al Arabiya as-Souriya (Syrian Air Force) — United Arab Emirates: United Arab Emirates Air Force — Yemen: Al Quwwat al Jawwiya al Yemeniya (Yemeni Air Force)
331	South Asia — Bangladesh: বাংলােদশ িবমান বািহনী – Bangladesh Biman Bahini (Bangladesh Air Force) — India: भारतीय वायु सेना – Bharatiya Vayu Sena (Indian Air Force), Indian Army Aviation Corps, Indian Naval Air Arm, Bharatiya Tatarakshak Dal (Indian Coast Guard) — Maldives: Maldives National Defence Force — Mauritius: Mauritius Coast Guard — Pakistan: پاک فضائیہ – Pak Fiza'ya (Pakistan Air Force), Pakistan Army Aviation Wing, Pakistan Navy Air Arm — Sri Lanka: Sri Lanka Air Force
332	Central Asia — Afghanistan: Afghan Melli-e Ourdou (Afghan National Army Air Corps) — Bhutan: Bhutan Air Force — China: 中国人民解放军空军 – Zhongguo Renmin Jiefangjun Kongjun (People's Liberation Army Air Force), 中国人民解放军海军航空兵 – Zhongguo Renmin Jiefangjun Haijun Hangkongbing (People's Liberation Army Naval Air Force), 中国人民解放军陆军 (People's Liberation Army Ground Force Aircraft) — Mongolia: Агаарын Довтолгооноос Хамгаалах Цэргийн Командлал (Mongolian Air Defense Forces Command) — Nepal: Nepalese Army Air Service
333	Southeast Asia — Cambodia: Toap Akas Khemarak Phoumin – Force Aérienne Royale Cambodge (Royal Cambodian Air Force) — Indonesia: Tentara Nasional Indonesia Angkatan Udara (TNI-AU) (Indonesian National Air Force), Dinas Penerbangan TNI Angkatan Laut (TNI-AL) (Indonesian Naval Aviation), Dinas Penerbangan TNI Angkatan Darat (TNI-AD) (Indonesian Army Aviation) — Laos: Lao People's Liberation Army Air Force — Malaysia: Udara DiRaja Malaysia (TUDM) (Royal Malaysian Air Force) — Myanmar: Tatmdaw Lei (Myanmar Air Force) — Singapore: Chinese: 新加坡空军部队; Malay: Angkatan Udara Republik Singapura; Tamil: சிங்கப்பூர் ஆகாயப்படை (Republic of Singapore Air Force) — Thailand: กองทัพอากาศไทย – Kongthap Akat Thai (Royal Thai Air Force) — Vietnam: Không Quân Nhân Dân Việt Nam (Vietnamese People's Air Force)
334	Far East (North) — Japan: 航空自衛隊 – Kōkū Jieitai (Japan Air Self-Defense Force), 海上自衛隊 – Kaijō Jieitai (Japan Maritime Self-Defense Force), 陸上自衛隊 – Rikujō Jieitai (Japan Ground Self-Defense Force) — North Korea: 조선인민군 공군 (Korean People's Air Force) — South Korea: 대한민국 공군 (大韓民國空軍) – Daehan Minguk Gonggun (Republic of Korea Air Force)
335	Far East (South) — Philippines: Hukbong Himpapawid ng Pilipinas (Philippine Air Force) — Republic of China (Taiwan): 中華民國空軍 – Chung-Hua Min-Kuo K'ung-Chün (Republic of China Air Force), Republic of China Army Aviation and Special Forces Command, Republic of China Naval Aviation Command
336	Australasia — Australia: Royal Australian Air Force, Australian Navy Aviation Group (Royal Australian Navy Fleet Air Arm), Australian Army Aviation — Fiji: There are no aircraft in the inventory of the Military of Fiji — New Zealand: Royal New Zealand Air Force — Papua New Guinea: Papua New Guinea Defence Force — Tonga: Tonga Defence Services
337	North Africa — Algeria: القوات الجوية الجزائرية – Al Quwwat aljawwiya aljaza'eriiya (Algerian Air Force) — Cape Verde: Força Aérea Caboverdiana (Cape Verde Air Force), Guarda Costeira de Cabo Verde (Cape Verde Coast Guard) — Chad: Force Aérienne Tchadienne (Chadian Air Force) — Egypt: Egyptian Air Force — Libya: القوات الجوية الليبية – Adwas Alibyan Ujnna (Libyan Air Force) — Mali: Force Aérienne de la Republique du Mali (Mali Air Force) — Mauritania: Force Aérienne de la Republique Islamique de Mauritanie (Mauritanian Air Force) — Morocco: القوات الجوية الملكية المغربية – Al Quwwat Al Jawwiya Al Malikiya Al Maghrebiya (Force Aérienne Royale Marocaine) (Royal Moroccan Air Force) — Niger: Escadrille Nationale du Niger (National Squadron of Niger) — Tunisia: Al Quwwat al-Jawwiya al-Jamahiriyah At'Tunisia (Tunisian Air Force)
338	Central Africa (West) — Angola: National Air Force of Angola — Benin: Force Aérienne Populaire de Benin (Benin Air Force) — Burkina Faso: Force Aérienne de Burkina Faso (Burkina Faso Air Force) — Cameroon: Armée de l'Air du Cameroun (Cameroon Air Force) — Côte d'Ivoire: Côte d'Ivoire Air Force — Central African Republic: Force Aérienne Centrafricaine (Central African Republic Air Force) — Congo: L'Armée de l'Air du Congo (Congolese Air Force) — Congo (Zaïre): Force Aérienne du Congo (Air Force of the Democratic Republic of the Congo) — Equatorial Guinea: Air Force of Equatorial Guinea — Gabon: Armée de l'Air Gabonaise (Gabon Air Force) — Gambia: Gambian Air Force — Ghana: Ghana Air Force — Guinea Bissau: Força Aérea da Guiné-Bissau (Guinea-Bissau Air Force) — Guinea Republic: Force Aérienne de Guinée (Guinea Air Force) — Liberia: Liberian Army Air Wing — Nigeria: Nigerian Air Force — Rwanda: Force Aérienne Rwandaise (Rwandan Air Force) — Senegal: Armée de l'Air du Sénégal (Senegalese Air Force) — Sierra Leone: Sierra Leone Defence Force — Togo: Force Aérienne Togolaise (Togolese Air Force)
339	Central Africa (East) — Burundi: Force Armée du Burundi (Burundi Army Aviation) — Djiboti: Force Aérienne du Djibouti (Djiboti Air Force) — Eritrea: Eritrean Air Force — Ethiopia: Ye Ithopya Ayer Hayl (Ethiopian Air Force) — Kenya: Kenya Air Force — Madagascar: Armée de l'Air Malgache (Malagasy Air Force) — Somalia: Somali: Ciidamada Cirka Soomaaliyeed, Italian: 'Corpo di Sicurezza della Somalia, Somali Aeronautical Corps' (Somali Air Force) (defunct) — Sudan: Al Quwwat al-Jawwiya As-Sudaniya (Sudanese Air Force) — Tanzania: Jeshi la Anga la Wananchi wa Tanzania (Tanzanian People's Defense Force Air Wing) — Uganda: Ugandan Air Force
340	Southern Africa — Botswana: Botswana Defence Force Air Wing — Lesotho: Lesotho Defence Force – Air Squadron — Malawi: Malawi Army Air Wing — Mozambique: Forca Aérea De Moçambique (Mozambique Air Force) — Namibia: Namibian Air Force — South Africa: South African Air Force — Swaziland: Swazi Air Force — Zimbabwe: Air Force of Zimbabwe
341	North America — Canada: Canadian Forces Air Command — Mexico: Fuerza Aérea Mexicana (Mexican Air Force), Fuerza Aeronaval (Mexican Naval Aviation) — United States of America: United States Air Force, United States Army Aviation Branch, United States Naval Aviation, United States Marine Corps Aviation, Air National Guard, NASA
342	Central America — Belize: Belize Defence Force Air Wing — Costa Rica: Servicio de Vigilancia Aérea (SVA) – Fuerza Pública (Air Surveillance Service) — Dominican Republic: Dominican Air Force, Escuadrón de Caballería Aérea (EdCA) (Dominican Air Cavalry Squadron), Cuerpo de Aviación Naval Dominicana (Dominican Republic Naval Aviation Corps) — El Salvador: Fuerza Aérea Salvadoreña (Salvadoran Air Force) — Guatemala: Guatemalan Air Force — Honduras: Honduran Air Force — Nicaragua: Nicaraguan Air Force — Panama: Servicio Nacional Aeronaval (National Air-Sea Service)
343	Caribbean — Bahamas: Royal Bahamas Defence Force — Barbados: Barbados Defence Force — Cuba: Fuerza Aérea Revolucionaria (Cuban Revolutionary Air Force), Aviación Naval (Cuban Naval Aviation) — Haiti: Corps d'Aviation d'Garde d'Haiti (Haiti Air Corps) — Jamaica: Jamaican Defence Force — Trinidad & Tobago: Trinidad and Tobago Defence Force Air Guard
344	South America (North) — Bolivia: Fuerza Aérea Boliviana (Bolivian Air Force) — Brazil: Força Aérea Brasileira (Brazilian Air Force), Aviação Naval Brasileira (Brazilian Naval Aviation), Aviação do Exército (Brazilian Army Aviation) — Colombia: Fuerza Aérea Colombiana (Colombian Air Force), Aviación Naval (Colombian Naval Aviation), Ejército (Colombian National Army Aviation) — Ecuador: Fuerza Aérea Ecuatoriana (Ecuadorian Air Force), Aviacióin Naval Ecuatoriana (Ecuadorian Naval Aviation), Aviación del Ejército Ecuatoriano (Ecuadorian Army Aviation) — Guyana: Guyana Defence Force — Peru: Fuerza Aérea del Perú (Peruvian Air Force), Fuerza de Aviación Naval (Peruvian Naval Aviation), Aviación del Ejército (Peruvian Army Aviation) (Spanish Wikipedia article — Venezuela: Aviación Militar Venezolana (Fuerza Aérea Venezolana before 2006) (Venezuelan Air Force), Servicio Aéreo del Ejército Venezolana (Venezuelan Army Aviation), Aviación de la Marina Venezolana (Venezuelan Naval Aviation), Comando de Apoyo Aéreo de Guardia Nacional (National Guard of Venezuela)
345	South America (South) — Argentina: Fuerza Aérea Argentina (Argentine Air Force), Comando de Aviación Naval Argentina (Argentine Naval Aviation), Comando de Aviación del Ejército Argentino (Argentine Army Aviation Command), Servicio de Aviación de la Prefectura Naval Argentina (Coast Guard Air Service), Dirección de Aeronáutica de Gendarmería (Border Guard Air Service) — Chile: Fuerza Aérea de Chile (Chilean Air Force), Servicio de Aviación de la Armada de Chile (or Aviación Naval) (Chilean Naval Aviation), Comando de Aviación del Ejército de Chile (or Aviación del Ejército) (Chilean Army Aviation) — Paraguay: Aeronautica Militar Paraguaya (Paraguayan Air Force), Aviación Naval Paraguaya (Paraguayan Naval Aviation) — Uruguay: Fuerza Aérea Uruguaya (Uruguayan Air Force), Aviación Naval Uruguaya (Uruguayan Naval Aviation)

Air Forces of the World – unlisted in World Aircraft Information Files
File	Title
---	Unlisted — Armenia: Հայաստանի Ռազմաօդային Ուժեր (Armenian Air Force) — Brunei: Tentera Udara Diraja Brunei (Royal Brunei Air Force) — Iceland: Íslenska Loftvarnarkerfið (Iceland Air Defence System), Landhelgisgæsla Íslands – Flugdeild (Icelandic Coast Guard Aeronautical Division) — Malta: Armed Forces of Malta No.2 Regiment – Air Squadron — Republika Srpska: Ratno Vazduhoplovstva i Protivvazdušna Odbrana Vojska Republike Srpske (Republika Srpska Air Force) — Zambia: Zambian Air Force and Air Defence Command)

War in the Air Files Files 346–385 (40 files)
File	Title
346	Early air wars
347	World War I: Western Front
348	World War I: Eastern Front
349	World War I: Southern Front
350	World War I: Bombing offensive
351	Inter-war air wars — Colonial operations — The Nomonhan Incident American flashpoints — Leticia dispute — Chaco War
352	Spanish Civil War
353	World War II: Blitzkrieg on Europe
354	World War II: Battle of Britain
355	World War II: Cross-Channel operations (Operation Circus)
356	World War II: Balkans — Battle of Greece — Battle of Crete
357	World War II: North Africa to Alamein — Siege of Malta (World War II) — North African Campaign — Western Desert Campaign
358	World War II: Out of Africa and Sicily — Tunisia Campaign — Allied invasion of Sicily — Operation Tidal Wave
359	World War II: Italian Campaign
360	World War II: Air war on the Eastern front
361	World War II: Stalemate in the East
362	World War II: Retreat from Stalingrad
363	World War II: Battle of the Atlantic
364	World War II: Night bombing
365	World War II: Day-bomber offensive
366	World War II: D-Day to Arnhem
367	World War II: Race for the Reich — Operation Baseplate — Battle for Berlin
368	World War II — Pearl Harbor — Singapore — Philippines
369	World War II: Allied reversals
370	World War II : Island-hopping — Battle of Midway — Battle of Tarawa
371	World War II: The Philippines
372	World War II — Okinawa — Iwo Jima
373	World War II: China, Burma and India
374	World War II: Bomber offensive
375	Korea
376	Colonial Conflicts — Indonesia–Malaysia confrontation — Malayan Emergency — Operatie Product — Suez Crisis — Mau Mau Uprising — Algerian War — Guinea-Bissau War of Independence
377	Cold War
378	Middle East wars — Six-Day War — Yom Kippur War — Iran–Iraq War — Israeli–Lebanese conflict
379	Vietnam
380	Falklands
381	Southern Asia — China and Taiwan — Indo-Pakistan air wars — Sri Lanka
382	African air wars — Rhodesia — Angola: Executive Outcomes — Horn of Africa — Nigerian Civil War — Liberia — Sierra Leone Civil War
383	South American air wars — Argentina — Bolivia — British Guiana — Chile — Colombia — Ecuador against Peru — Paraguay — Peru — Venezuela — Central America (Guatemala) — El Salvador — Nicaragua
384	Desert Storm
385	UN Peacekeeping — Operation Provide Comfort — Desert Fox — Deny Flight — Allied Force

Aviation Hall of Fame Files 386–397 (12 files)
File	Title
386	Civilian Pioneers — Wilbur & Orville Wright — Wiley Post — Charles A. Lindbergh — Amy Johnson
387	Engineers and Designers — 'Kelly' Johnson & Ben R. Rich — Sir Sydney Camm — Kurt Tank — Andrei Tupolev
388	Entertainers — Tony Richards — Anna Walker — Andy Sephton — Brian Lecomber & John Taylor
389	Fighter Aces WWI German — Manfred Freiherr von Richthofen — Ernst Udet — Erich Loewenhardt — Werner Voss — Oswald Boelcke — Lothar von Richthofen — Max Immelmann — Theodor Osterkamp; Commonwealth — Edward 'Mick' Mannock — William Avery Bishop — Raymond Collishaw
390	Fighter Aces WWII German — Werner Mölders — Erich Hartmann — Gerhard Barkhorn — Gunther Rall — Otto Kittel — Anton Hafner — Walter Nowotny — Heinz Bar — Hans-Joachim Marseille — August Lambert — Hermann Buchner — Heinz-Wolfgang Schnauffer — Helmut Lent — Adolf Galland — Egon Mayer — Helmut Wick; British Empire — Douglas Bader — Adolf Gysbert 'Sailor' Malan — Robert Roland Stanford Tuck — James Edgar 'Johnnie' Johnson — James Henry 'Ginger' Lacey — Marmaduke Thomas St John 'Pat' Pattle; American — Thomas B. 'Tommy' McGuire, Jr — Richard Ira Bong — Francis Stanley 'Gabby' Gabreski — R.S. 'Bob' Johnson — Dominic Salvatore 'Don' Gentile — David S. McCampbell — Edward H. 'Butch' O'Hare — Gregory 'Pappy' Boyington — Joseph Jacob Foss; Czech — Josef Frantisek; Finish — Ilmari Juutilainen — Hans Wind; French — Marcel Albert — Jean Demozay — Pierre Le Gloan; Soviet — Ivan Kozhedub — Aleksandr Pokryshkin — Grigori Rechkalov — Lidiya Vladimirovna 'Lilya' Litvak
391	Post-War Aces — Herbert E. Gossard & William B.D. Dowell — Everett T. Raspberry & Robert W. Western — Everett T. Raspberry & Francis M. Gullick — Robin Olds & John B. Stone — Darrell D. Simmonds & George McKinney — Jeffrey S. Feinstein — Calvin B. Tibbet — William Hargrove & Michael Ettel
392	Industry Entrepreneurs — Howard Hughes — Sir Freddie Laker — Sir Richard Branson
393	Medal Winners Battle of Britain VCs — J.B. Nicholson — R. A. B. Learoyd — J. Hannah
394	Military Leaders and Tactician — Curtis LeMay — Sir Arthur 'Bomber' Harris — Lord Trenchard — Hugh Dowding — James 'Jimmy' Doolittle — Sir Keith Park — Ira Eaker — Nigel 'Sharkey' Ward
395	Racer — Lyle Shelton — Skip Holm — Pete Law & Bruce Boland — Darryl Greenamyer — Bill Kerchenfaut — Steve Hinton
396	Post-war speed records — H. J. Wilson — A. Boyd — Turner F. Caldwell — Marion E. Carl — J. Slade Nash — Colonel William F. Barnes — Richard L. Johnson — M.J. Lithgow — Neville Duke — James B. Verdin — F. K. Everest — Horace A. Hanes — Peter Twiss — Georgii Mosolov — Adrian E. Drew — Walter W. Irwin — Joseph W. Rogers — Robert L. Stephens — Robert B. Robinson — Eldon W. Joersz
397	Test Pilots — Charles 'Chuck' Yeager — Roland 'Bee' Beamont — Neville Duke, Hanna Reitsch — Eric Brown — Geoffrey de Havilland — Scott Crossfield — Victor Pugachev — Jeffrey Quill — Yevgeny Frolov — Anatoly Kvotchur

World Civil Aircraft Files 339–560 (163 files)
File	Title
398	Aero Spacelines Guppy
399	Aérospatiale SA 365 Dauphin family
400	Aérospatiale/Eurocopter Ecureuil family
401	Aérospatiale SA.330 Puma/SA.332 Super Puma
402	Aérospatiale/BAC Concorde
403	Airbus A300
404	Airbus A310
405	Airbus A320
406	Airbus A330
407	Airbus A340
408	Airtech CN-235
409	Antonov An-2 'Colt'
410	Antonov An-12 'Cub'
411	Antonov An-22 Antei 'Cock'
412	Antonov An-24 'Coke' family
413	Antonov An-124 Ruslan 'Condor'
414	Antonov An-225 Mriya 'Cossack'
415	Armstrong Whitworth Argosy
416	ATR 42/72
417	BAC One-Eleven
418	Beech Model 55/58 Baron
419	Beechcraft Bonanza
420	Beech Model 18
421	Beech King Air family
422	Beech Model 99 Airliner
423	Raytheon 1900
424	Bell 206 JetRanger family
425	Bell 212/214/412
426	Bell 222
427	Boeing 247
428	Boeing 307 Stratoliner
429	Boeing 314 Clipper
430	Boeing 377 Stratocruiser
431	Boeing 707
432	Boeing 720
433	Boeing 727
434	Boeing 737
435	Boeing 737 Series 300/400/500
436	Boeing 737-600/700/800/900
437	Boeing 747
438	Boeing 747-400
439	Boeing 747SP
440	Boeing 757
441	Boeing 767
442	Boeing 777
443	Boeing Vertol 234 Commercial Chinook
444	Bombardier Global Express
445	Breguet Br.760 series
446	Bristol 170 Freighter
447	Bristol Brabazon
448	Bristol Britannia
449	BAe/Avro 146/RJ
450	British Aerospace ATP/Jetstream 61
451	British Aerospace (Handley Page) Jetstream
452	Britten-Norman Islander
453	Canadair CL-44
454	Canadair CL-215
455	Canadair CL-600/-601 Challenger
456	Bombardier (Canadair) Regional Jet
457	Cessna Piston-engined 'singles'
458	Cessna Twin-engined models
459	Cessna Citation family
460	Convair 240 family
461	Convair 880
462	Convair 990
463	Curtiss CR-20
464	Dassault Falcon family
465	de Havilland Moth family
466	De Havilland DH.89 Dragon Rapide
467	de Havilland DH.104 Dove
468	de Havilland DH.106 Comet
469	de Havilland DH.114 Heron
470	de Havilland Canada DHC-2 Beaver
471	de Havilland Canada DHC-3 Otter
472	de Havilland Canada DHC-6 Twin Otter
473	de Havilland Canada DHC-7 Dash 7
474	de Havilland Canada DHC-8 Dash 8
475	Dornier Do X
476	Dornier Do J Wal
477	Douglas DC-2
478	Douglas DC-3
479	Douglas DC-4 Skymaster
480	Douglas DC-6
481	Douglas DC-7
482	Douglas DC-8
483	Douglas DC-9
484	McDonnell Douglas DC-10
485	EMBRAER EMB-110 Bandeirante
486	EMBRAER EMB-120 Brasilia
487	EMBRAER ERJ-145/-135
488	Focke-Wulf Fw 200 Condor
489	Fokker F.VII/F.VII-3m
490	Fokker F27 Friendship/50
491	Fokker F28 Fellowship
492	Ford Tri-Motor
493	Grumman G.159 Gulfstream I
494	Gulfstream Aerospace Gulfstream II/III
495	Handley Page Herald
496	Handley Page H.P.42
497	Hawker Siddeley HS.748
498	Hawker Siddeley HS.125 family
499	Hawker Siddeley Trident
500	Heinkel He 70
501	IAI/Rockwell Jet Commander/Westwind/Astra
502	Ilyushin Il-12 'Coach'/14 'Crate'
503	Ilyushin Il-18 'Coot'
504	Ilyushin Il-62 'Classic'
505	Ilyushin Il-76 'Candid'
506	Ilyushin Il-86 'Camber'/Il-96
507	Ilyushin Il-114
508	Junkers F 13
509	Junkers G 38
510	Junkers Ju 52/3m
511	Latécoère 631
512	Learjet
513	LET L-410/610
514	Lockheed Model 10/12/14/18
515	Lockheed Constellation
516	Lockheed L-188 Electra
517	Lockheed L-100 Hercules
518	Lockheed L-1011 Tristar
519	Lockheed Vega/Orion
520	Martin 2-0-2/4-0-4
521	McDonnell Douglas MD-11
522	McDonnell Douglas MD-80 family
523	McDonnell Douglas MD-90/Boeing 717
524	MD Helicopters (McDonnell Douglas) MD500
525	MD Helicopters (Boeing/McDD) MD 900 Explorer
526	Mil Mi-8/Mi-17 'Hip'
527	Mitsubishi/Beech Diamond/Beechjet
528	Mitsubishi MU-2
529	NAMC YS-11
530	Piper Cherokee
531	Piper Cub family
532	Piper Apache/Aztec
533	Piper PA-31 Navajo
534	Pitts S-1/S-2 Special
535	PZL/Antonov An-28 'Cash'
536	Robinson R22/R44
537	Rockwell Sabreliner
538	Saab 340
539	Saab Scandia
540	SATIC A300-600ST Beluga
541	Savoia-Marchetti SM.73
542	Shorts 330/Shorts 360
543	Short 'C'-class/'G'-class
544	Short Sandringham/Solent
545	Sikorsky S-61
546	Sikorsky S-76 Spirit
547	Sud Caravelle
548	Sud-Est Languedoc
549	Swearingen Merlin/Metro
550	Tupolev Tu-104 'Camel'
551	Tupolev Tu-114 Rossiya 'Cleat'
552	Tupolev Tu-124 'Cookpot'
553	Tupolev Tu-134 'Crusty'
554	Tupolev Tu-144 'Charger'
555	Tupolev Tu-154 'Careless'
556	Tupolev Tu-204/214
557	Vickers Vanguard
558	Vickers VC10
559	Vickers Viking
560	Vickers Viscount

Airlines of the World Files 561–800 (273 files)
File	Title
561	Airborne Express
562	ACES Colombia
563	Adria Airways
564	Aer Lingus
565	Aeroflot
566	Aerolíneas Argentinas
567	Aero Lloyd
568	Aeromexico
569	AeroPeru
569a	Aeropostal
569b	African Safari Airways
570	Air 2000
571	Air Afrique
572	Air Algérie
572a	Air ALM
573	Atlantic Airlines/Air Atlantique
573a	Air Baltic
574	Air Canada
575	Air Charter
576	Air China
577	Air Europa
577a	Air Europe
578	Air Florida
579	Air Foyle
580	Air France
581	Air-India
582	Air Inter
583	Air Jamaica
583a	Air Koryo
584	SriLankan Airlines
585	Air Liberté
586	Air Littoral
586a	Air Macau
586b	Air Madagascar
586c	Air Malawi
586d	Air Maldives
587	Air Malta
588	Air Mauritius
589	Air Namibia
590	Air New Zealand
591	Air Niugini
591a	Air Seychelles
592	Air Transat
593	Air Transport International
594	Airtours International
595	Air UK/KLM uk
596	Air Ukraine/Ukraine International Airlines
597	Air Zimbabwe
598	Alaska Airlines
598a	Alliance Air/SA Alliance Air
599	Alitalia
600	All Nippon Airways
601	Aloha Airlines
602	America West Airlines
603	American Airlines
604	American International Airways
605	American Trans Air
606	Ansett
607	AOM French Airlines
607a	Arkia Israeli Airlines
608	Arrow Air
609	Asiana Airlines
609a	Atlas Air
610	Austrian Airlines
611	Aviaco
612	Avianca
613	Alitalia Express
614	Aviateca
615	Avensa
616	Azerbaijan Airlines
617	Balair/CTA
618	Balkan Bulgarian Airlines
619	Belavia Belarusian Airlines
620	Biman Bangladesh Airlines
621	Binter Canarias/Binter Mediterraneo
622	Bouraq Indonesia Airlines
623	Braathens S.A.F.E.
624	Braniff International Airways
625	Brit Air
626	Britannia Airways
627	British Airways
628	British Midlands
629	BWIA West Indies Airways
629a	Cameroon Airlines
630	Caledonian Airways
631	Canada 3000
632	Canadian Airlines
633	Cargolux Airlines International
634	Carnival Air Lines
635	Cathay Pacific
636	Channel Express (Air Services)
637	China Airlines
638	China Eastern
639	China Northern
640	China Northwest
641	China Southern
642	China Southwest Airlines
643	China United Airlines
644	China Xinjiang Airlines
5645	China Yunnan Airlines
645a	CityBird
646	Condor Flugdienst
647	Continental Airlines
648	Copa Airlines
648a	Corsair
649	Croatia Airlines
650	Crossair
651	Cubana de Aviacion
652	Cyprus Airways
653	CSA Czech Airlines
654	Dan-Air London
655	Delta Air Lines
656	Delta Air Transport
657	Deutsche BA
658	DHL Airways
659	Dominicana
659a	Dragonair
660	Eastern Airlines
660a	easyJet Airline
661	Egyptair
662	El Al Israel Airlines
663	Emery Worldwide Airlines
664	Emirates
665	Estonian Air
666	Ethiopian Airlines
667	Euralair International
668	European Air Transport
669	Eurowings
670	EVA Air
671	Evergreen International Airlines
672	Far Eastern Air Transport
673	Faucett Peru
674	Federal Express – FedEx
675	Finnair
676	Fred. Olsen Airtransport
676a	Frontier Airlines
677	Garuda Indonesia
677a	GB Airways
678	Germania
679	Ghana Airways
680	Gulf Air
681	Guyana Airways 2000
681a	Hainan Airlines
682	Hapag-Lloyd Flug
683	Hawaiian Airlines
684	HeavyLift
685	Iberia
686	Icelandair
687	Imperial Airways
688	Indian Airlines
689	Iran Air
690	Iraqi Airways
691	Istanbul Airlines
692	Japan Airlines
693	Japan Air System
694	JAT Yugoslav Airlines
694a	JMC Air
695	Air Kazakhstan
696	Kenya Airways
697	Kiwi International
698	KLM Royal Dutch Airlines
699	Korean Air
700	Kuwait Airways
701	LACSA
702	Ladeco
703	Laker Airways
704	LANChile
705	TAM Paraguay
706	Líneas Aéreas Privadas Argentinas – LAPA
707	Lauda Air
707a	LIAT
708	Libyan Arab Airlines
709	Lithuanian Airlines
710	LAB Airlines (Lloyd Aereo Boliviano)
711	LOT Polish Airlines
712	LTU International Airlines
713	Lufthansa
714	Luxair
715	Maersk Air
716	Malaysia Airlines
717	Malév Hungarian Airlines
718	Martinair
719	Meridiana
720	Merpati
721	Mexicana
722	Middle East Airlines
723	Midway Airlines
724	Midwest Express Airlines
725	Monarch Airlines
725a	MIAT – Mongolian Airlines
726	Nigeria Airways
727	Northwest Airlines
728	Olympic Airways
728a	Oman Air
729	Airzena Georgian Airlines
730	PIA – Pakistan International Airlines
731	Pan Am
732	Philippine Airlines
733	Piedmont Airlines
5734	Pluna Líneas Aéreas Uruguayas
735	PGA Portugalia Airlines
735a	Premiair
736	Qantas
736a	Qatar Airways
737	Reeve Aleutian Airways
738	Regional
739	Reno Air
740	Rich International Airlines
741	Rio-Sul Serviços Aéreos Regionais
742	Royal Air Maroc – RAM
743	Royal Brunei Airlines
744	Royal Jordanian
744a	Royal Nepal Airlines
745	Ryanair
746	Ryan International
747	Sabena
748	SAETA
749	Safair
750	SAHSA
751	Scandinavian Airlines
751a	SATA Air Açores/SATA International
752	Saudi Arabian Airlines
753	Seaboard World Airlines
754	Sempati Air
755	Shanghai Airlines
756	Sichuan Airlines
757	Singapore Airlines
758	Sobelair
759	South African Airways
760	Southwest Airlines
761	Spanair
761a	Sterling European
762	Sudan Airways
763	Sun Country Airways
764	Swissair
765	Syrianair
766	TAAG
767	TAESA
768	TACA
769	Tajikistan Airlines
770	TAM
771	TAP Air Portugal
772	TAROM Romanian Air Transport
773	TAT European Airlines
774	Thai Airways
775	THY Turkish Airlines
776	TNT Airways
777	Tower Air
777a	Transaero Airlines
778	TransAsia Airways
779	Transavia
780	TransBrasil
781	TransAer
782	Tunisair
783	Turkmenistan Airlines
784	Trans World Airlines
785	Tyrolean Airways
791	VARIG Brasil
792	VASP
793	VIASA
794	Vietnam Airlines
795	Virgin Atlantic
796	Western Airlines
797	Widerøe
797a	World Airways
798	Xiamen Airlines
799	Yemenia
800	Zantop Airlines

Air Accidents Files 801–809 (9 files)
File	Title
801	Criminal Action — The loss of Kanishka
802	Landing Accidents — DHC-5 Buffalo crash at the Farnborough Air Show — Undercarriage collapse, Virgin Atlantic A340 — Learjet 25B overshoot at RAF Northolt Air Algerie 737-200 crash at Coventry
803	Disaster on Takeoff — Collision between KLM and Pan Am Boeing 747s at Tenerife
804	Weather — Pan Am 727 Wind sheer
805	Engine Failure — Airtours 737, Manchester
806	Structural Failure — JAL 747SR pressure bulkhead failure — British International Helicopters VC 234 gearbox failure — DC-10 disaster — Fateful R101
807	Icing — Munich tragedy
808	Human Error — San Diego air disaster — Trident deep stall — Mid-air collision! Zagreb — Tenerife taxiway — Erebus disaster
809	Military Accidents — Catastrophe at Ramstein — The Bermuda Triangle (includes Flight 19 and Star Tiger/Star Ariel) — Disaster at Farnborough — Over the edge — Last ride of the Valkyrie; YF-14A hydraulic failure — A clos intercept; Mig-29 at Paris — MiG mayhem at Fairford — EP-3 collision

Private Aviation Files 810–829 (18 files)
File	Title
810	Competitive aerobatics — Competitions — Basic aerobics — Advanced aerobatics — Contemporary Acts: AeroSuperbatics
811	Civilian Autogyros
812	Ballooning
813	Business Aviation — Introduction — Global reach
814	Club trainers — Learning to fly
815	Gliders
816	Hang-gliders
817	Helicopters
818	Homebuilts
819	Joyriding
820	Microlights
821	Parachuting
822	Racing aircraft
823	Sightseeing
824	Touring aircraft — Cessna — Piper — Beech — SOCATA
825	Vintage Aircraft
826	Veteran Aircraft
827	Warbirds
828	Aeromedical research
829	Agricultural aircraft

Special Purpose Aviation Files 830–858 (31 files)
File	Title
830	Air ambulance
831	Air cargo
832	Animal Protection and Survey
833	Antarctic supply
834	Border Patrol
835	Bush planes
836	Calibration – checking the airways
837	Drug patrol
838	Aerial photography
839	Firebombers
840	Fishery patrol
841	The Flying Hospital
842	Fuel transport
843	Livestock transport
844	Logging
845	Meteolorogical Reconnaissance
846	Mineral survey (Aerial geophysics)
847	Mountain rescue
848	Oceanographic research
849	Oil exploration and support (Bristow oil support)
850	Parcel delivery
851	Photo-survey/Mapping
852	Police aviation (Aerial law enforcement)
853	Pollution control (Air Atlantique)
854	Rescue at sea (Helicopter rescue)
855	Search (US police tactics) (FLIR/NVGs)
856	Traffic Patrol (Police technology))
857	Warbird organisation — Confederate Air Force — The Fighter Collection — Source Classic Jets — Jean Salis Collection — Planes of Fame — Old Flying Machine Company — Valiant Air command — Alpine Fighter Collection — Shuttleworth Collection — Battle of Britain Memorial Flight — Royal Navy Historic Flight — Army Air Corps Historic Aircraft Flight
858	Weather modification (Rain makers)

Aviation Technology Files 859–888 (30 files)
File	Title
859	Aerodynamics
860	Airships
861	Altitude
862	Avionics
863	Balloons
864	Bomber Development
865	Carrier aircraft — VTOL — STOVL — STOBAR
866	Compound helicopters
867	Convertiplanes
868	Engine testbeds
869	Fighter development
870	Flying-boats
871	Gliders
872	Helicopters
873	Maneuverability
874	Propulsion systems
875	Radar
876	Range
877	Reconnaissance aircraft
878	Floatplanes
879	Search for Speed — Schneider Trophy — Bell X-1 — DH.108 — XB-70 Valkyrie — X-15
880	Short take-off — RATO: Rocket-Assisted Take-Off
881	Russian bombers — TB Class (TB-3, TB-7) — DB class (DB-1, Yer-2) — SB class (SB/SB-2, PB-100/Pe-2)
882	Soviet fighters
883	Undercarriage Experiments
884	Unmanned Aircraft
885	US Bombers — USAAF — USAF
886	US Fighters — USAAF — USAF
887	Vertical take-off
888	Weapons

A-Z of Aircraft Files 889–914 (26 files)
File	Title
889	A — AAMSA A9B Quail to Ayres Thrush
890	B — Baade VL-DDR 152 to Bushmaster 2000
891	C — CallAir Model A to Curtiss Wright Model 200 X-19
892	D — DAR Aircraft to Dufaux aircraft
893	E — Eagle Aircraft – Eagle 220 and Eagle 300 to Extra 400
894	F — F+W C-3602, C-3603, C-3604 and C-3605 to Funk Model B
895	G — General Aircraft G.A.L.38 Fleet Shadower to Gulfstream American GA-7 and Cougar
896	H — Häfeli DH-2 and Häfeli DH-3 to Hurel-Dubois aircraft
897	I — IAI 101, 102, 201 and 202 Arava to IPTN N-250
898	J — Jodel light aircraft to Junkers W 33 and W 34
899	K — Kalinin aircraft to Kyushu Q1W Tokai
900	L — Lake Buccaneer to L.W.S. 4 and L.W.S. 6 Zubr
901	M — Macchi L.1 and L.2 to Myasishchev M-17 Stratosfera & M-55 Geophysica 'Mystic'
902	N — Nakajima A2N Navy Type 90 Carrier Fighter) to Northrop Grumman E-2 Hawkeye
903	O — OOS Stal-2 and Stal-3
904	P — Panavia Tornado to P.Z.L. Warszawa-Okecie PZL-130 Orlik
905	Q — No aircraft, no file
906	R — Raytheon Premier to Ryan S-T, ST and PT series
907	S — Saab 17 to Swearingen SJ30
908	T — Transall C.160 to Tupolev Tu-334
909	U — UTVA aircraft
910	V — Vickers F.B.5 Gunbus to Vultee V-72 A-31/A-35 Vengeance
911	W — Westland Lynx to Wright brothers aircraft
912	X — XAC JH-7/FBC-1 Flying Leopard
913	— Yakovlev Yak-1 I-26 to Yokosuka P1Y Ginga
914	Z — Zeppelin-Staaken R series to Zmaj aircraft

History of Aviation Files 915–1008 (94 files)
File	Title
915	Pre-1903 part 1 (c.1250 – 1896) — Pre-18th century — 18th century — 1800–1880
916	Pre-1903 part 2 (1880–1902) — 1880s — 1890s — 1900 — 1901 — 1902
917	1903, 1904, 1905
918	1906, 1907 1908
919	1909, 1910, 1911
920	1912–1913
921	1914
922	1915
923	1916
924	1917
925	1918
926	1919
927	1920
928	1921
929	1922
930	1923
931	1924
932	1925
933	1926
934	1927
935	1928
936	1929
937	1930
938	1931
939	1932
940	1933
941	1934
942	1935
943	1936
944	1937
945	1938
946	1939
947	1940
948	1941
949	1942
950	1943
951	1944
952	1945
953	1946
954	1947
955	1948
956	1949
957	1950
958	1951
959	1952
960	1953
961	1954
962	1955
963	1956
964	1957
965	1958
966	1959
967	1960
968	1961
969	1962
970	1963
971	1964
972	1965
973	1966
974	1967
975	1968
976	1969
977	1970
978	1971
979	1972
980	1973
981	1974
982	1975
983	1976
984	1977
985	1978
986	1979
987	1980
988	1981
989	1982
990	1983
991	1984
992	1985
993	1986 — includes Rutan Voyager
994	1987
995	1988
996	1989
997	1990
998	1991
999	1992
1000	1993
1001	1994
1002	1995
1003	1996
1004	1997
1005	1998
1006	1999
1007	2000
1008	2001

== Depth of coverage ==
Since each subject was covered in only 2 or 4 sides (in a "file"), the depth of coverage could be limited, although for many subjects, this was overcome by including many sheets on different aspects of the same subject (for example, different variants, different uses, etc.).

The A-Z of aircraft was based on previous Aerospace Publishing publications with some updating. The bias towards aircraft types early in the alphabet was accentuated in the partwork, with letters A through F making up fully 64% of the total while letters P through Z made up 9%.
