= Waifs and Strays (disambiguation) =

Waifs and Strays is a short story collection by O. Henry.

Waifs and Strays also may refer to:

- Waifs and Strays (poetry collection), a book by Micah Ballard
- Waifs & Strays (album), by Ian McNabb
- "Waifs and Strays", a single from Marc Almond's album Enchanted
- Waifs and Strays Society, former name of The Children's Society, an English charity

== See also ==
- Waif and stray, a legal privilege under Anglo-Norman law
- Waif (disambiguation)
- Stray (disambiguation)
