= AIDC F-CK-1 Ching-kuo =

Taiwanese multirole jet fighter

F-CK-1 Ching-Kuo
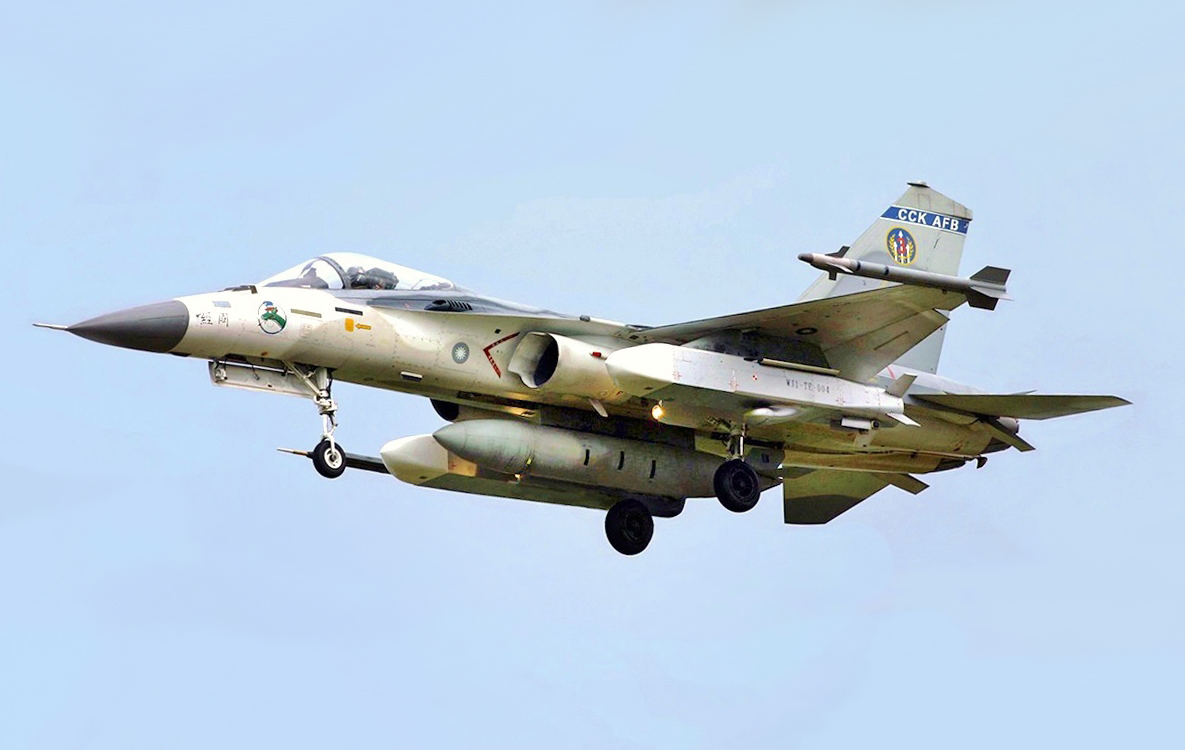
- F-CK-1 Ching Kuo of the 3rd Tactical Fighter Wing, based at Ching Chuan Kang Air Base, Taichung

General information
- Type: Multirole fighter
- National origin: Taiwan
- Manufacturer: Aerospace Industrial Development Corporation
- Status: In service
- Primary user: Republic of China (Taiwan) Air Force
- Number built: 137 (6 prototypes and 131 serials)

History
- Manufactured: 1990–2000 (A/B models)
- Introduction date: 1992
- First flight: 28 May 1989
- Developed into: AIDC T-5

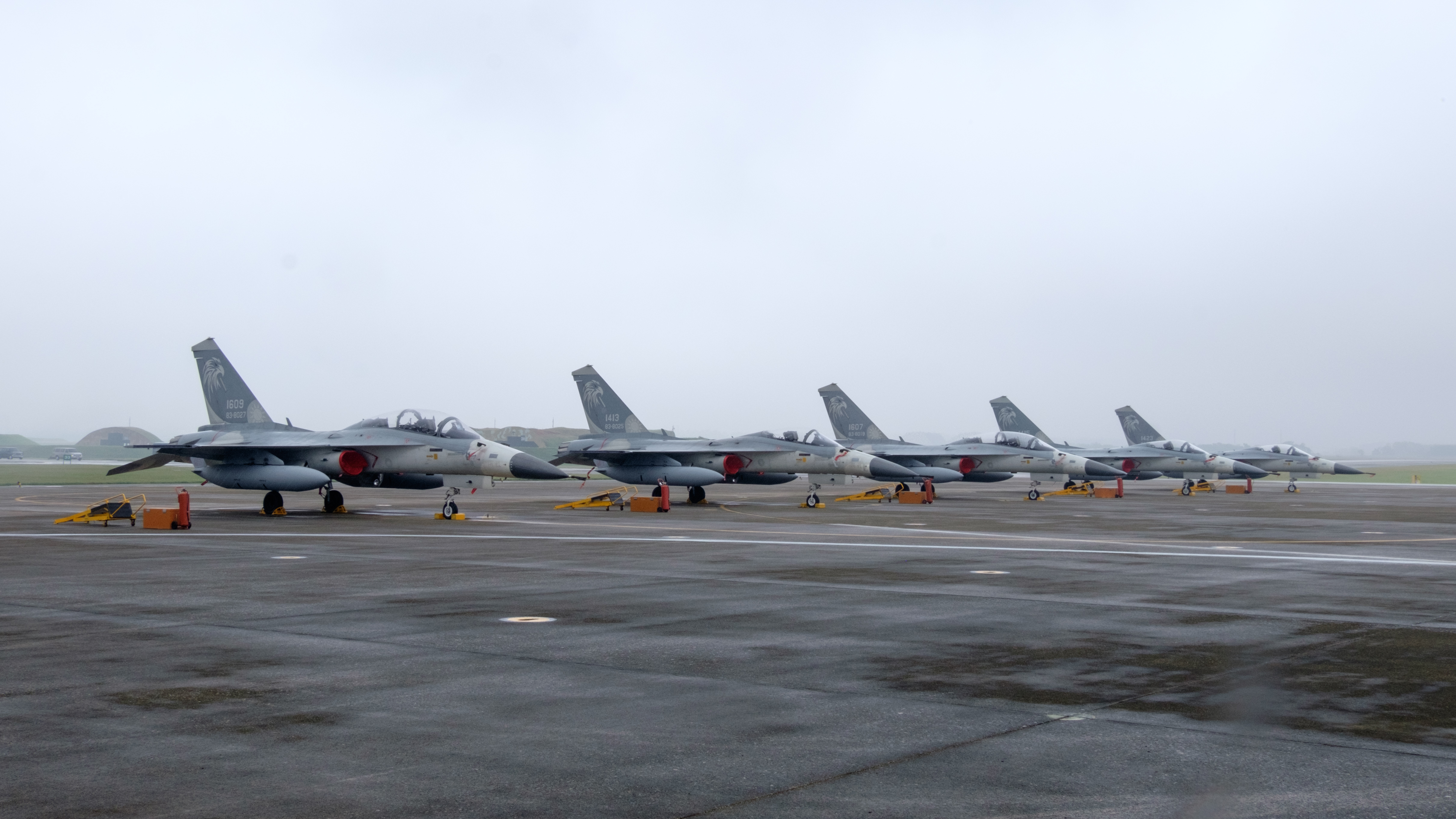
Five F-CK-1s of 427th Wing parked at Ching Chuan Kang Air Base

The AIDC F-CK-1 Ching-Kuo (Chinese: 經國號戰機; pinyin: Jīngguó Hào Zhànjī; Wade–Giles: Ching¹-kuo² Hao⁴ Chan⁴-chi¹), commonly known as the Indigenous Defense Fighter (IDF), is a multirole combat aircraft named after Chiang Ching-kuo, the late President of the Republic of China (Taiwan). The aircraft made its first flight in 1989. It entered service with the Republic of China Air Force (ROCAF) in 1992. All 130 production aircraft were manufactured by 1999.

Taiwan initiated the IDF program when the United States refused to sell them F-20 Tigershark and F-16 Fighting Falcon jet fighters following diplomatic pressure from China. Taiwan therefore decided to develop an advanced indigenous jet fighter. The Aerospace Industrial Development Corporation (AIDC), based in Taichung, Taiwan, designed and built the IDF fighter jet.

== Development ==
=== Background ===
The preliminary search for a replacement for the ROCAF's F-5s and F-104s began in the late 1970s with the XF-6 indigenous fighter project, later renamed Ying Yang. After the United States established formal relations with the People's Republic of China and ended the Mutual Defense Treaty with Taiwan, President Chiang Ching-Kuo decided to expand the indigenous defense industry and on 28 August 1980 ordered Aerospace Industrial Development Corporation (AIDC) to design an indigenous interceptor. Originally, the ROCAF listed the priority of the XF-6 behind the XA-3 Lei Ming single-seat attack aircraft, due to the believed high risks of the XF-6 project.

The signing of the 1982 US–China joint statement limited US arms sales to Taiwan. The US refused to sell the General Dynamics F-16 Fighting Falcon and the Northrop F-20 Tigershark (which had been developed largely to meet Taiwanese national defense needs) thereby ensuring the continuation of the indigenous defense fighter (IDF) project. Although US President Ronald Reagan reluctantly accepted his advisers' suggestion of building relations with China to counter the USSR, Reagan decided to balance the 1982 US–PRC joint statement with the "Six Assurances" to Taiwan. This opened the door for US technology transfer and assistance to Taiwan's defense industry, including the IDF project.

=== Design phase ===
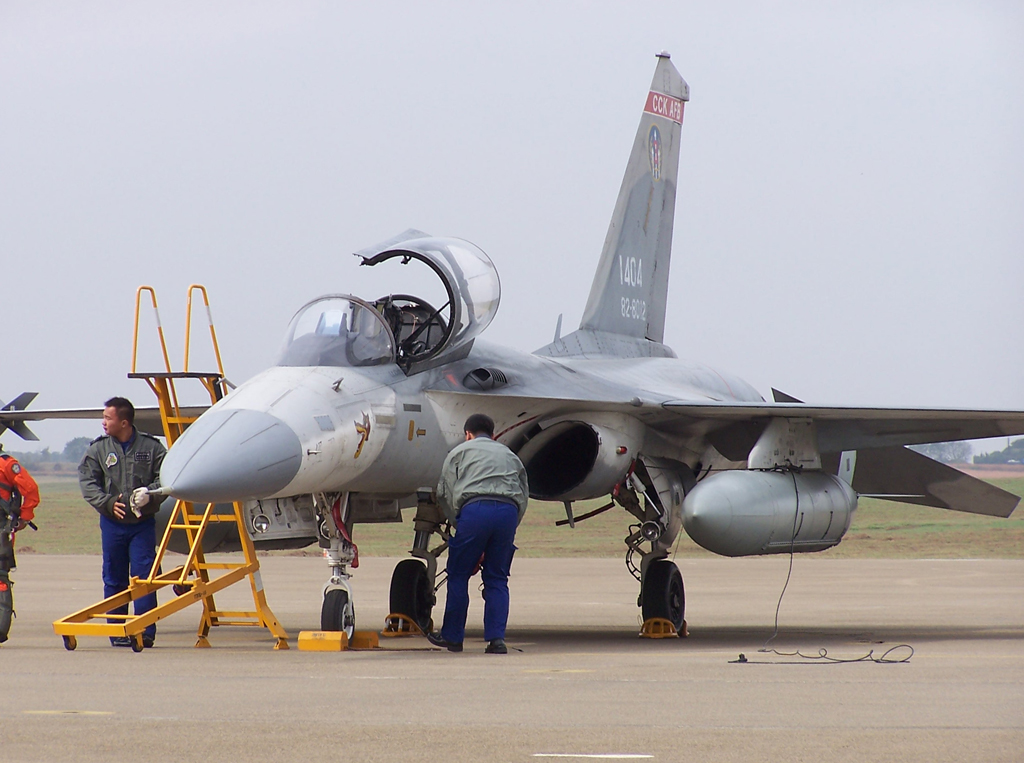
Pre-production F-CK-1A model

AIDC officially began the IDF development project in May 1982 following the ROCAF's inability to purchase new fighters from the US as a result of Chinese diplomatic pressure. AIDC was then led by Hsi-Chun Mike Hua, who the Taipei Times described as "the father of the Indigenous Defense Fighter" on his death in 2017. Hua contributed to the project, which was named An-Hsiang (安翔, Safe Flight) and in 1983 was divided into four sections:

- Ying-Yang (鷹揚): "Soaring Eagle". Development of the airframe, with some cooperation from General Dynamics.
- Yun-Han (雲漢): "Cloud Man". Development of the aircraft powerplant and propulsion, in cooperation with Garrett (now Honeywell).
- Tien-Lei (天雷): "Heavenly Thunder". Development of the avionics systems, with some cooperation from Smiths Industries, and some components purchased directly from Lear Astronics (today a subsidiary of BAE Systems), Litton (today a subsidiary of Northrop Grumman) and Martin-Baker.
- Tien-Chien (天劍): "Sky Sword". Development of air-to-air missiles.

Chief of the General Staff General Hau Pei-tsun noted in his daily diary of 5 January 1983 that AIDC was moved under the administration of the defence ministry's Chungshan Institute of Science and Technology (CSIST). He believed that only CSIST could bring together the resources and personnel required for the IDF project.

==== Engines ====
Exports of advanced engines such as the General Electric F404 or the Pratt & Whitney F100 were not available to Taiwan. Both the General Electric J85 and General Electric J79 were considered unsuitable in their performance, and most European and American engine companies declined to cooperate with the project. Joint investment with Garrett became the only practical solution.

In 1978, following the success of the TFE731 engine, US engine company Garrett announced joint research of the TFE1042 afterburner with the Swedish company Volvo Flygmotor. The TFE731 Model 1042 was touted as a low bypass ratio "military derivative" of the proven commercial TFE731 engine, and that it would provide "efficient, reliable, cost-effective propulsion for the next generation of light strike and advanced trainer aircraft", with a thrust of 4260 lbf (18.9 kN) dry and 6790 lbf (30.2 kN) with afterburner. After the initial negotiation, the investment was divided between Garrett, Volvo, AIDC, and the Italian company Piaggio. The development would consist of the non-afterburning TFE1042-6 for light attack aircraft and advanced trainers, and the TFE1042-7 for the AMX or the F-5 upgrade. AIDC also suggested upgrading the TFE1042-7 to 8,000 lbf (36 kN) thrust in a twin-engine installation, in order to compete with the GE F404. However, the JAS 39 Gripen project decided to continue with a single F404, and Piaggio asked to participate at a later date due to financial concerns.

International Turbine Engine Corporation (ITEC) was formed as a joint venture of Garrett and AIDC, and completely redesigned the TFE1042-7 into the TFE1042-70 – for example, the bypass ratio was changed from 0.84 to 0.4 – and investment had increased from US$180 million to about US$320 million. However, to avoid pressures from China, the US government asked all American companies cooperating with the Taiwan on the IDF project to remain low-key. Therefore, the perception that "the TFE1042 is merely the civilian engine TFE731 with an afterburner" was never completely dispelled.

In 1985, the preliminary review of the IDF's design revealed performance requirement shortfalls, and it was determined that an upgrade of engine thrust by 10% was the simplest solution. Due to US export-license restrictions, ITEC artificially limited the engine's thrust (utilizing FADEC) below a certain altitude (this restriction was not removed until 1990). Although the upgrade essentially used the TFE1088-11 configuration, to reduce political interference ITEC renamed the lower-thrust version as the TFE1042-X70 and retained the TFE1042-70 designation for the full-thrust version.

In 1988, ITEC decided to invest in the 12,000 lbf (53 kN) thrust TFE1088-12, which was similarly re-designated as the TFE1042-70A for political reasons. Preliminary studies had shown that the IDF could supercruise with the new engine. At the same time, General Electric Aviation decided to enter the market with the J101/SF, a smaller version of the F404. However, after the IDF order was cut in half due to budget concerns, the TFE1088-12 engine upgrade plan ended as well.

==== Aerodynamics ====
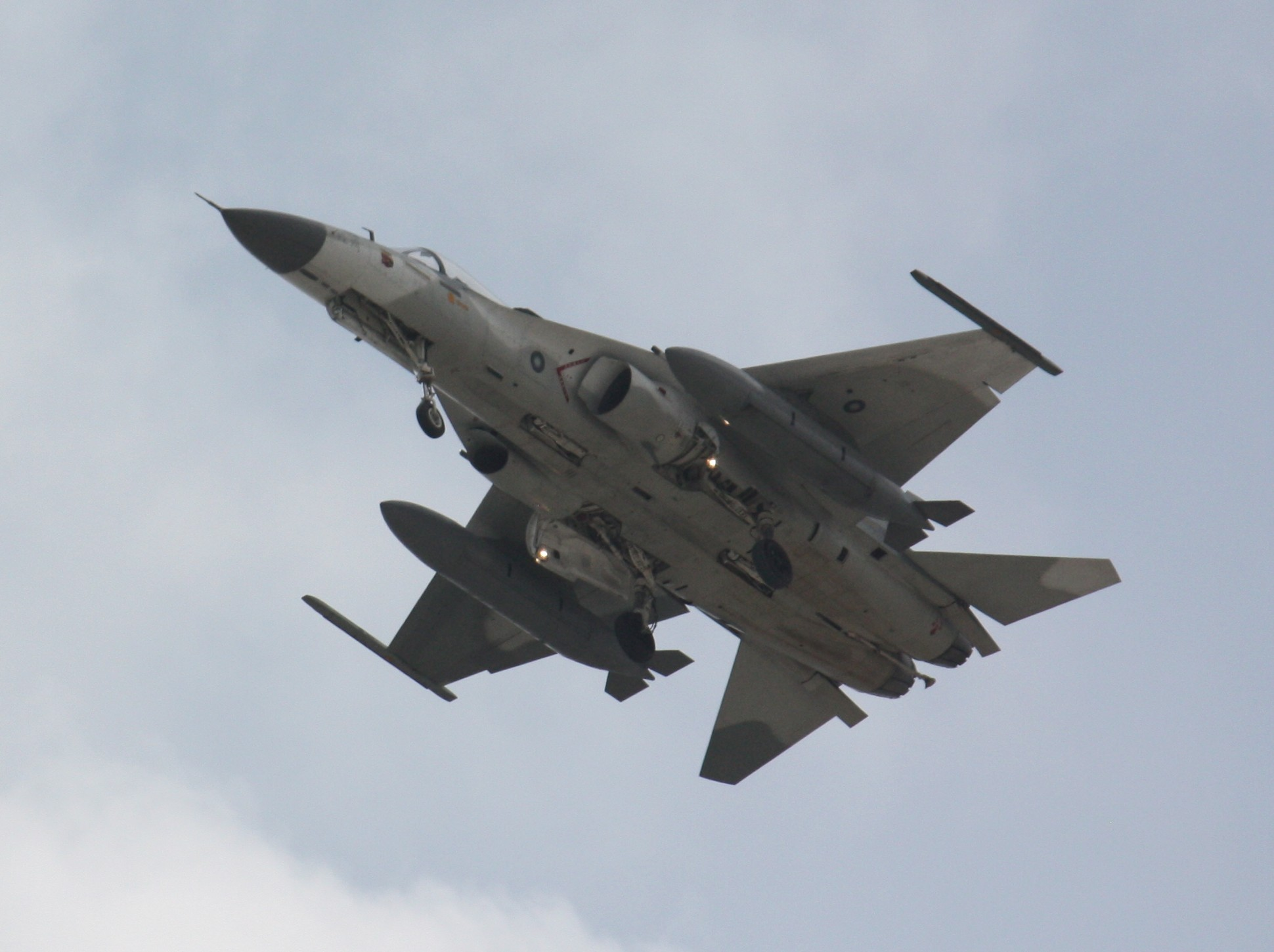
F-CK-1 landing at Tainan Air Base

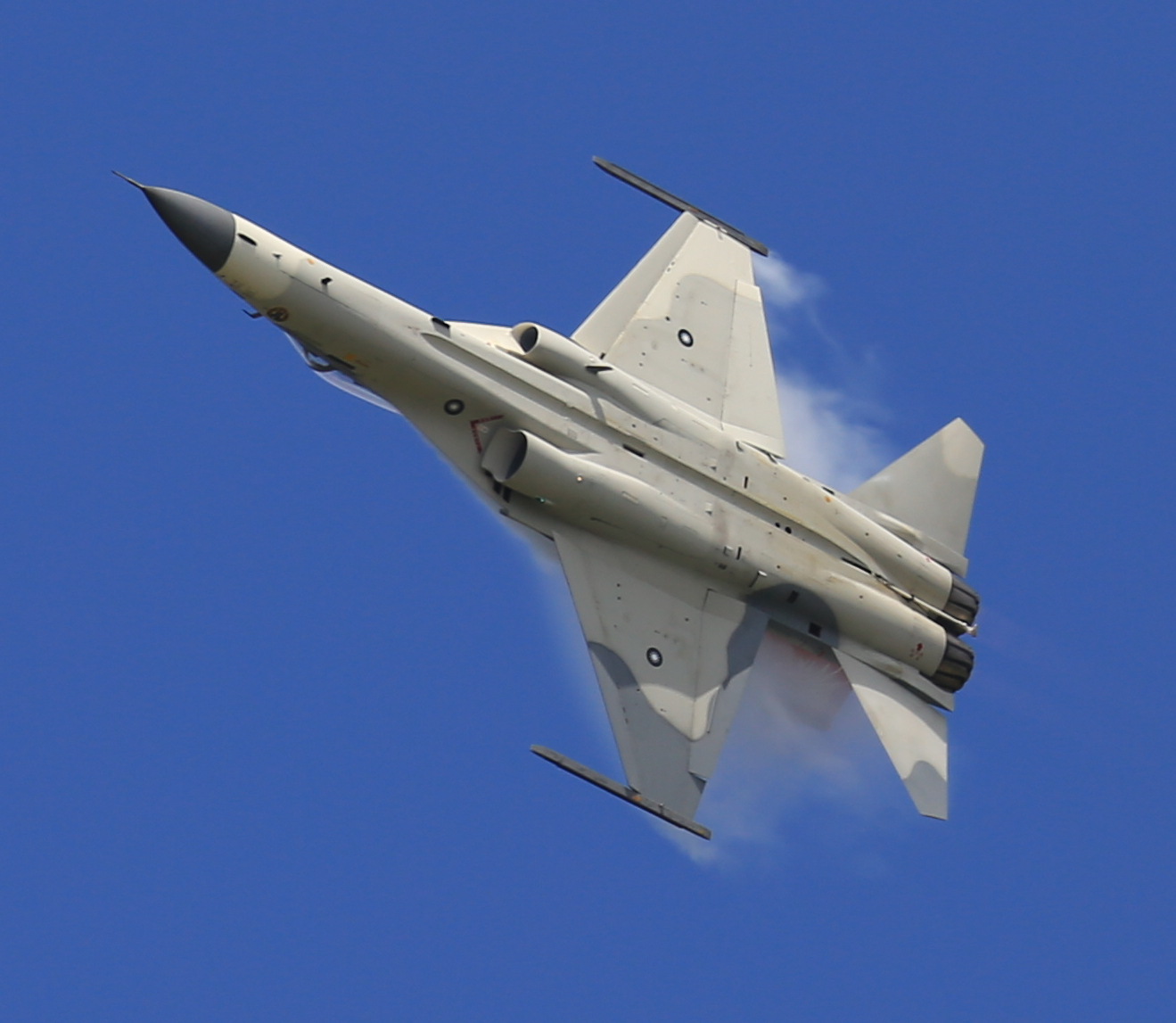
F-CK-1 in flight

The cooperation between AIDC and General Dynamics (GD) was divided into four phases:

- GD analyzed the ROCAF's aircraft performance and force requirements.
- Taiwan assessed GD's reports and chose between AIDC's original design and GD's new design.
- AIDC sent personnel to GD for the preliminary design phase.
- GD sent personnel to Taiwan to complete the project.

GD's assistance was restricted by US arms export control, which limited the company's work to consultation on the initial design with no further development, production, or marketing.

Many different airframe design concepts were explored (e.g. the 2D Thrust-Vectoring nozzle of XX-201, the double delta wings/twin tailed 401). After the General Electric J79 was officially abandoned as the potential engine solution in 1983, three configurations emerged from AIDC.

- Configuration A was similar to the F-5E.
- Configuration B was similar to the Eurofighter Typhoon and Saab Gripen.
- Configuration C was similar to the F-15.

At the same time, GD worked on the G configuration in parallel. Eventually the G-4 was selected, but with many features of the C-2 integrated. During this time, the project was named the "Light Weight Defense Fighter". In 1985, the configuration conceptual design had evolved into the SE-1 preliminary design. By the end of 1985, AIDC decided to skip the prototype stage and go into full-scale development (FSD) directly, in order to reduce time and save money. The project was again renamed as the Indigenous Defense Fighter (IDF). Four FSD aircraft were made, with three single-seaters and one double-seater.

==== Avionics ====
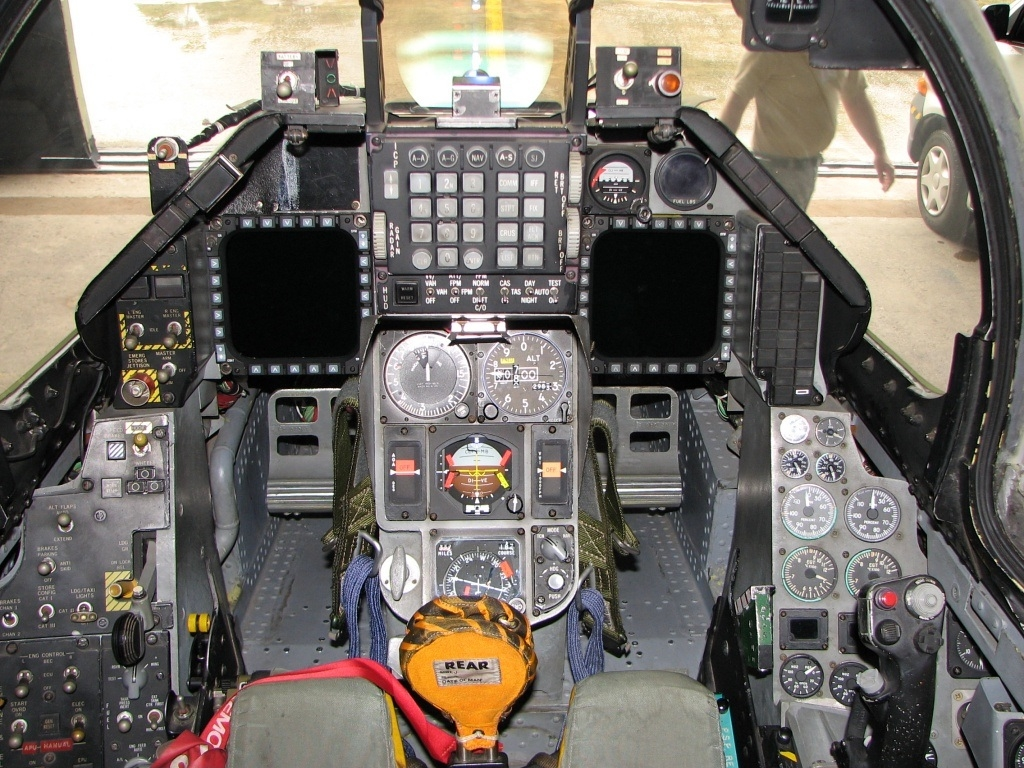
AIDC F-CK-1A cockpit

The IDF is equipped with a GD-53 Golden Dragon multi-mode monopulse pulse-Doppler radar, which is based on the General Electric AN/APG-67 X band radar developed for the F-20 while sharing some components and technologies of the AN/APG-66 radar of the F-16A, and using a larger antenna than the F-20. This adaptation resulted in the look-down and shoot-down capability of GD-53 being greatly enhanced and reaching that of the AN/APG-66. The radar can simultaneously track 10 targets and engage 2 of these 10 with TC-2 active-radar beyond-visual-range air-to-air missiles (BVRAAMs).

The design is inherently unstable in pitch, so the IDF incorporated a modern triple-redundant full authority fly-by-wire control system. The avionics suite was based on modular architecture with dual redundant MIL-STD-1553B digital databuses. The Honeywell H423 inertial navigation system, the TWS-95 RHAWS, and a Bendix-King head-up display were selected. Some capabilities may have been delayed or dropped in order to meet the performance requirement, since the engine limitation had resulted in the necessity of strict weight control.

==== Missiles ====
The Tien Chien (Sky Sword) project conducted at the Chungshan Institute of Science and Technology (CSIST) was slightly more independent, as the air-to-air missiles were developed for all ROCAF fighter aircraft. The Sky Sword I (TC-1) is a short range infrared-seeking missile with an external configuration similar to that of the AIM-9 Sidewinder, while the Sky Sword II (TC-2) is an active radar homing beyond-visual-range missile.

The first test firing of the TC-1 was performed by an F-5E in April 1986, with the Beech target drone successfully destroyed. Initial production of the TC-1 began in 1989, and it entered service in 1991. Both the AIM-9 and the TC-1 have been seen in use on operational IDFs.

CSIST is believed to have cooperated with Motorola and Raytheon on the TC-2's active seeker, which is believed to be based on a design the companies proposed for the AIM-120. 40 pre-production TC-2 missiles were produced before 1995, and were the only BVR AAMs that the ROCAF had in its inventory during the 1995–96 Taiwan Strait Missile Crisis. Over 200 production TC-2s were originally planned.

=== Upgrades ===
In April 1997, AIDC awarded Litton's Applied Technology division a production contract and options totalling $116.2 million for improved radar warning receivers (IRWR) to be installed aboard.

The first stage of upgrades to the fleet was originally planned to be completed by 2013, and was planned to include improved avionics, radar, electronics, weapons capabilities and lifespan extensions. In May 2014, the ROCAF released photos of the fighters with enhanced Wan Chien long-range missile capabilities. The upgrade program was completed in 2018.

== Variants ==
=== Planned nuclear strike aircraft ===
CSIST planned to modify at least one of the IDF aircraft to enable it to deliver a nuclear weapon to a range of 1,000 km (621 mi). As a nuclear weapon would be carried in place of the IDF's centerline fuel drop tank, this would add weight while reducing fuel and nominal range. To compensate, CSIST planned engine modifications for greater fuel efficiency while sacrificing acceleration and engagement capability.

Taiwan's nuclear weapons program was shut down in early 1988, months before the first IDF prototype was delivered.

=== Prototypes ===
Four "Full Scale Development" units were produced; three single-seaters followed by a two-seater. The first successful test flight by single-seater FSD A1 was made on 28 May 1989. The two-seater FSD B1 conducted its first flight on 10 July 1990. The first successful firing of the Tien-Chien II (Sky Sword II) air-to-air missile took place in 1992. The ROCAF established its first squadron of 10 pre-production F-CK-1s the following year.

=== Pre-production ===
Production of ten pre-production units began in October 1990. The first four were delivered in March 1992 and the last in 1993.

Mechanical defects caused two crashes, one in 1991 and one in 1993, during pre-production.

=== F-CK-1 A/B Ching-Kuo ===
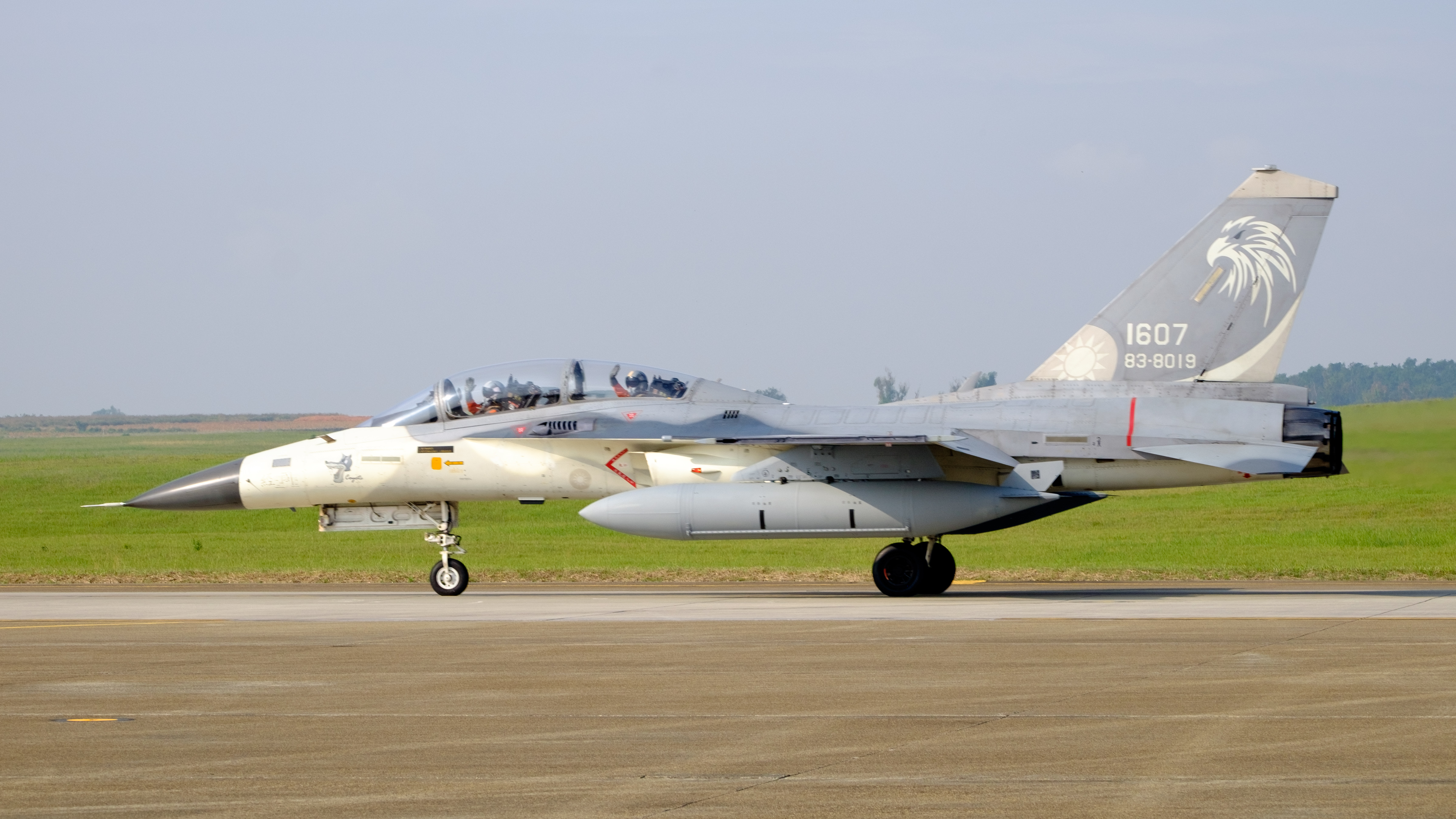
ROCAF F-CK-1B 1607 taxiing at Ching Chuang Kang Air Force Base

The ROCAF's initial order for 256 aircraft was cut to 130 in 1991, following deals for the purchase of 150 F-16 Block 20 A/B and 60 Mirage 2000-5Ei/Di from the US and France. The last IDF A/B rolled off the production line in 1999.

The first production units were delivered in early 1994, and the program concluded in 2000.

The first squadron entered service during the latter part of the 1994.

Mid-life updates to the aircraft were initiated in 2011.

=== F-CK-1 C/D Hsiang Sheng ===
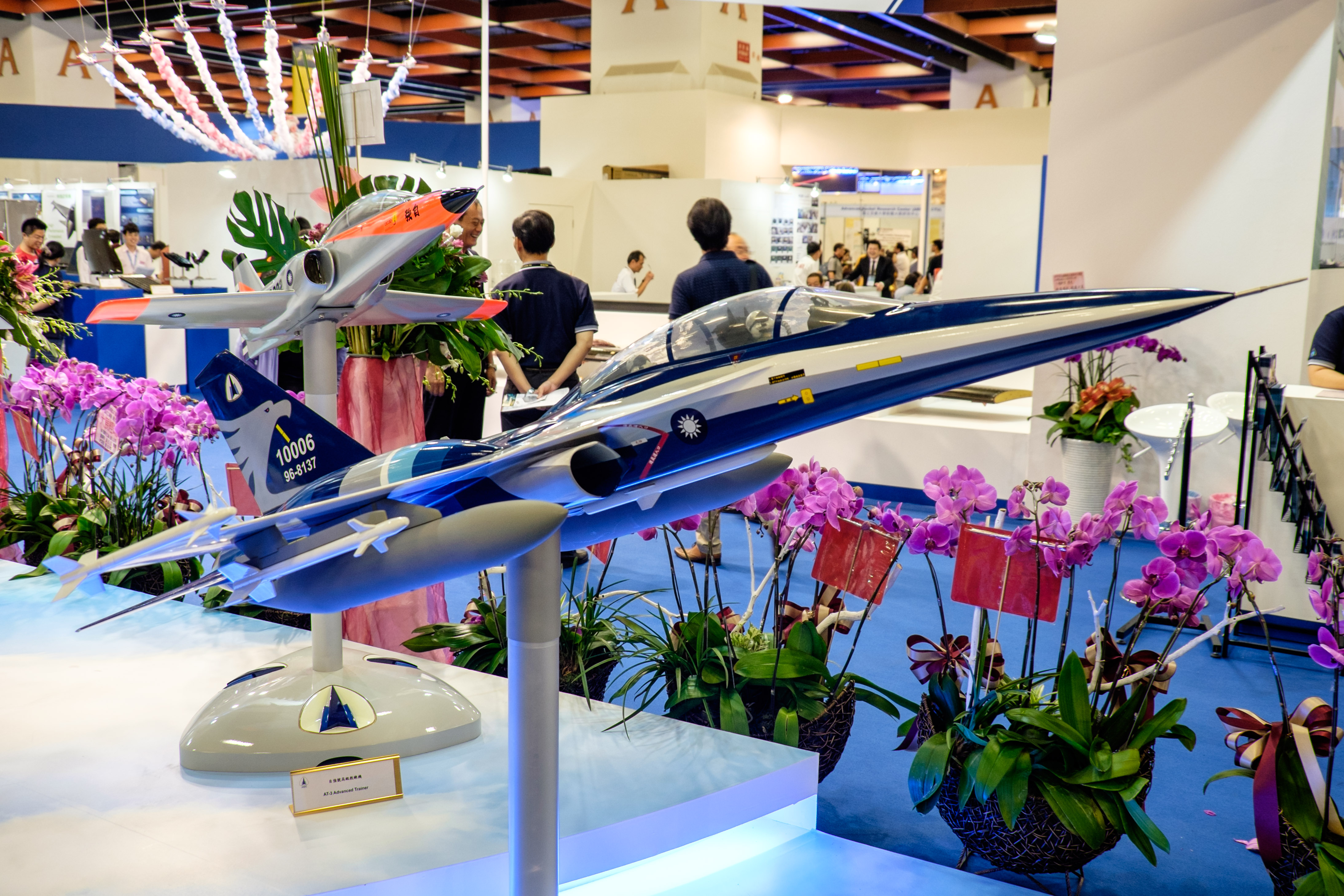
F-CK-1 C&D model on display at 2015 Taipei Aerospace and Defense Industry Exhibition

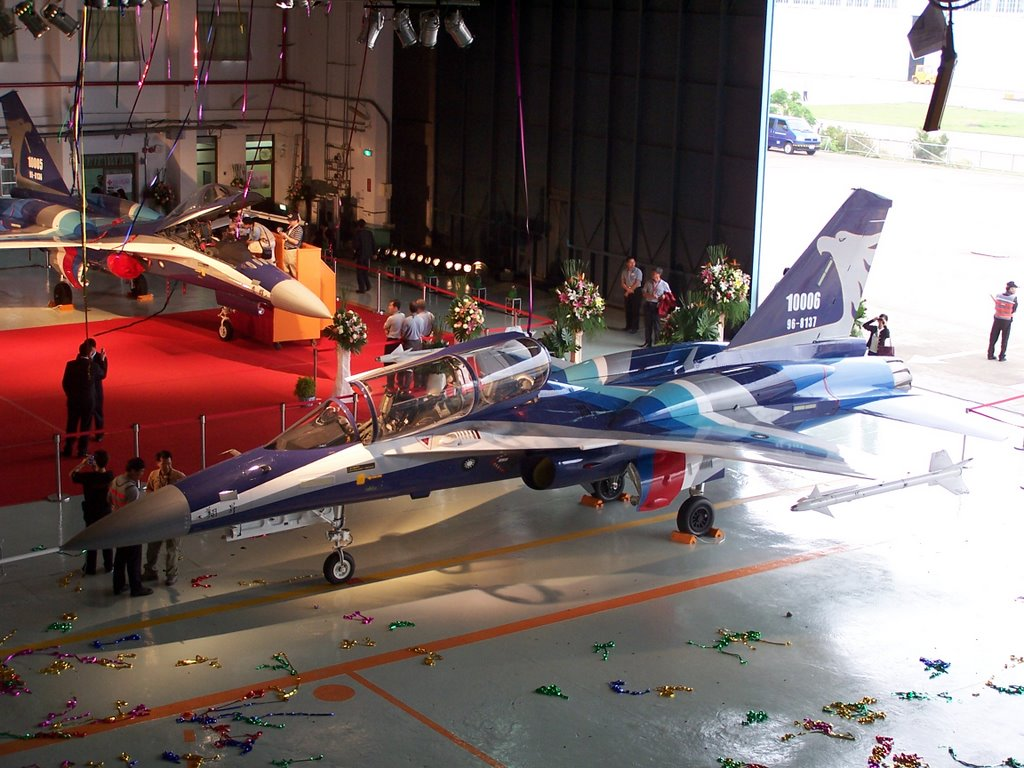
The F-CK-1D prototype ("Brave Hawk"), with the accompanying F-CK-1C single-seater prototype in the background, at their public unveiling.

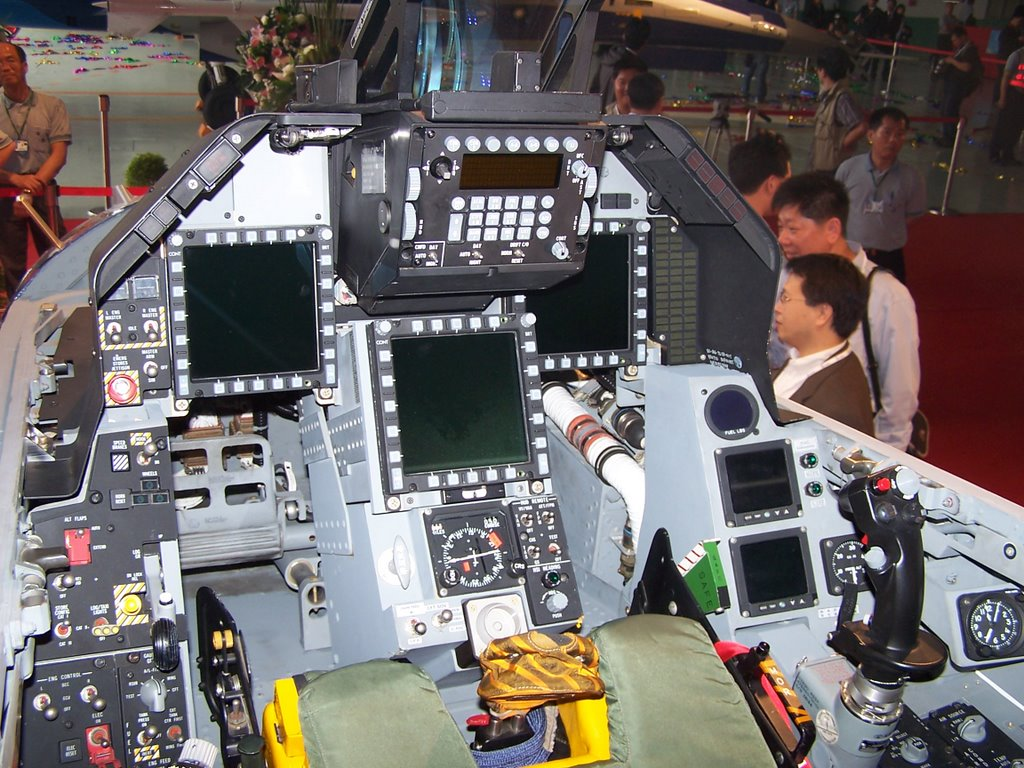
F-CK-1C/D cockpit view

The Ministry of National Defense (MND) announced that beginning in 2001, the government would include a new budget allocation for the IDF upgrade plan (as included in the five MND proposals to help AIDC). The five proposals were:

- Upgrades of the AT-3, IDF, and F-5 would be assigned to AIDC in the future.
- The Army Utility Helicopter, the Navy's long range ASW aircraft, a helicopter for the Marines, and an Air Force medium transport will all be produced and assembled by qualifying domestic firms in conjunction with the foreign firms that originally designed them.
- NCSIST and AIDC will jointly assemble a team for the early planning of the ROCAF's next generation fighter, in order to assess procurement methods and suggest concepts.
- AIDC's joint ventures with foreign firms or alliances with domestic firms will be given high priority in military aircraft service and maintenance.
- In the future, the military will give responsibility for weapons system flight tests, electronic warfare exercises, air towing drones, avionics maintenance, and weapons procurement planning to AIDC, in situations where AIDC has the professional capacity that the military lack. This is part of the seven-year IDF C/D R&D plan (FY2001~FY2007), which allocates 10 million New Taiwanese Dollars (NTD) annually for a total of 70 million NTD for both CSIST and AIDC. Initial media reports indicated that the upgraded IDF would be called the "Joint Countermeasure Platform".

In 2001, it was reported that development of a stealth variant with more powerful engines and improved fire-control system would commence that year. In a 2006 interview with Jane's Defence Weekly, former AIDC Chairman Sun Tao-Yu said that two new prototypes had been manufactured. The upgrade would allow the IDF to carry an additional 771 kg (1,700 lb) of fuel. In addition, it includes an improved avionics suite, retrofitted electronic warfare capabilities, and new weapons systems. The landing gear has been strengthened to accommodate the additional payload and fuel, but the plan for a dielectric radar-absorbing "stealth" fuselage was abandoned due to weight concerns. The project consists of three phases:

- Increase the carrying capacity for the TC-2 missile from two to four. Integrate the TC-2A anti-radiation missile and the Wan Chien cluster bomb. In addition, two conformal fuel tanks were seen on the two newly built prototype aircraft, though these were absent from production upgrades.
- Upgrade the mission computers, the electronic counter-countermeasures, the electronic warfare systems, the active identification friend or foe (AIFF) system and the terrain-following radar.
- Ground and air testing.

The development contract for the upgraded 32-bit IDF C/D flight control computer was awarded in 2002 to BAE Systems. AIDC said that the improvements of the flight computer will result in "a safer, higher-performing aircraft". Other improvements made include enhanced electronic warfare capabilities, a strengthened landing gear and a digital anti-skid system. The upgrade also included new indigenous flight control software, ending the reliance on US-controlled source code.

The first test flight of the upgraded IDF was reportedly successfully completed a few days ahead of schedule in early October.

On 27 March 2007, President Chen Shui-Bian witnessed a test flight of F-CK-1D, and announced that the upgraded IDF will be named Hsiung Ying (Brave Hawk), which signifies that the new fighter would protect the homeland just like the crested goshawk.

By December 2009 a contract had been signed with AIDC to upgrade 71 F-CK-1 A/B to F-CK-1 C/D over a four-year span at a cost of over US$500 million, according to AIDC, under Project Hsiang Chan (翔展). In 2018 AIDC delivered the last upgraded F-CK-1 C/D to the ROCAF.

=== IDF lead-in Taiwan ===
According to the media, the AIDC IDF trainer concept apparently involved the removal of the fire-control radar and combat systems while retaining rear-seat flight controls, so that the two-seat fighter could be used as a lead-in fighter trainer (LIFT). The ROCAF seemed to have reservations with the concept, however, as it would mean the IDF LIFT would not be usable in wartime. A MND letter said, "Regarding the newspaper report of AIDC's desire to use the IDF fighter as a basis for supersonic trainer development, it is only that company's operational planning concept. The Ministry of National Defense and the Air Force currently do not have such a plan". The letter then said that due to a tight budget allocation the ROCAF would instead ask AIDC to extend the life of the AT-3 and continue to use the F-5 in the LIFT role.

In 2003, former AIDC Chairman Huang Jung-Te said that AIDC still hoped the ROCAF would consider using a simplified version of the IDF for LIFT, and that such a concept could have a cost as low as US$16 million per unit, compared to the T-50's 19 million. The F-CK-1 LIFT modifications or new production concepts never received government funding or approval.

In May 2006, Lt. General Cheng Shih-Yu testified that the MND indeed plans to retire the F-5E/F by 2010 and allow the in-service IDFs to take over training missions. It is unclear what modifications (if any) will be made to IDFs after they become trainers.

== Operators ==
Taiwan

- Republic of China (Taiwan) Air Force – 131 aircraft, including 6 pre-production aircraft.

== Specifications (F-CK-1A) ==
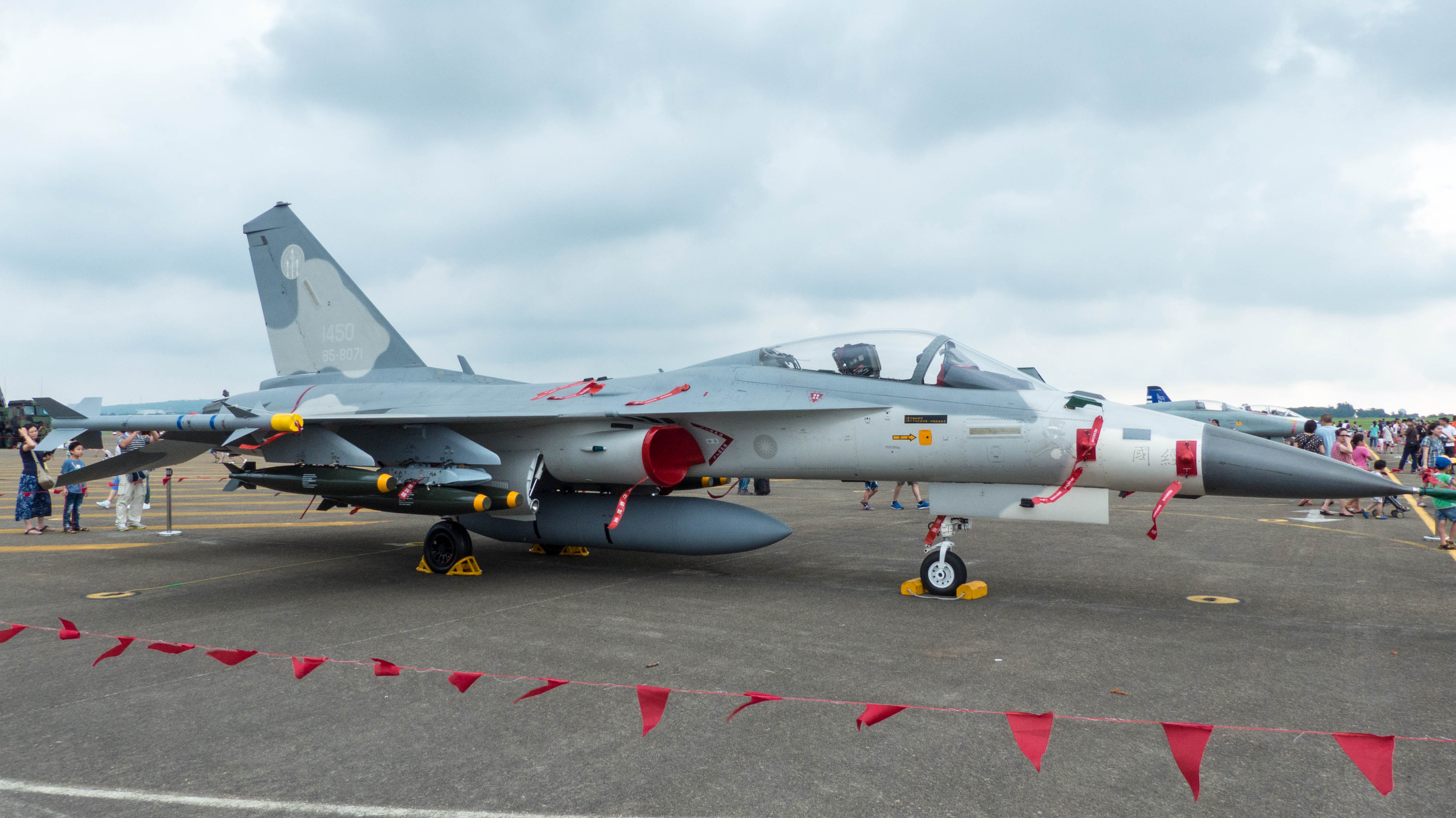
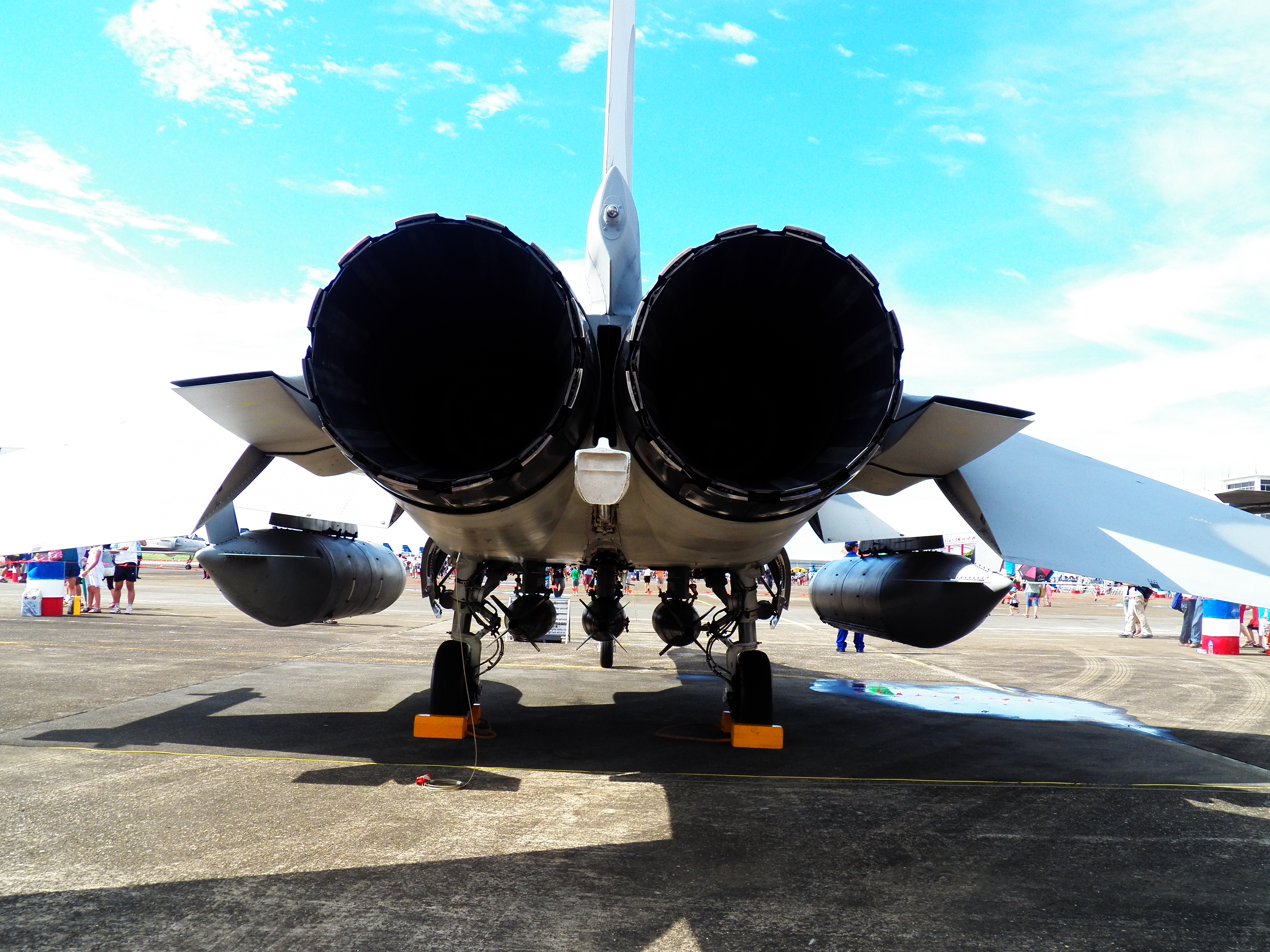
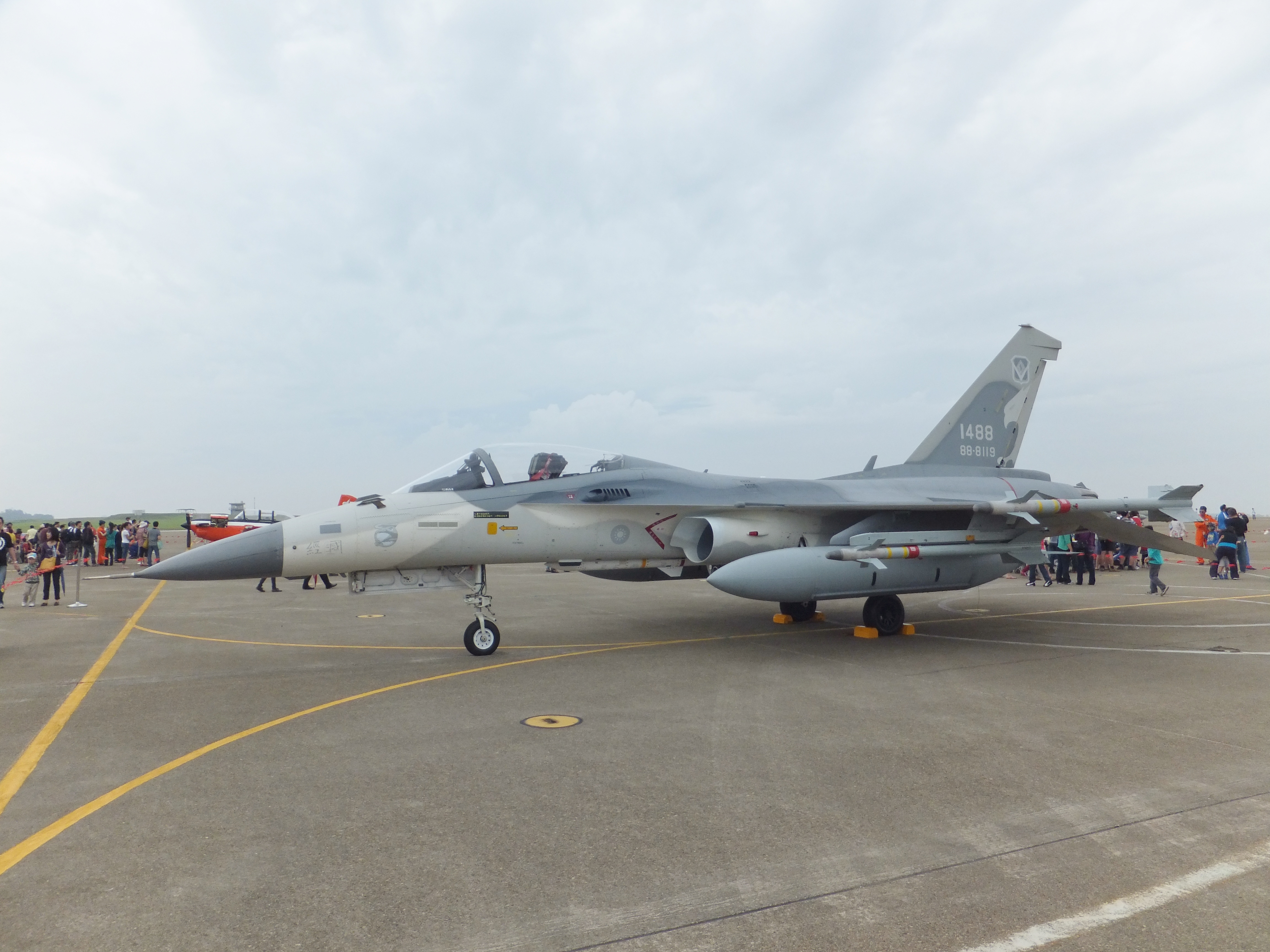
Three IDF F-CK-1As on display: with bomb load (top), showing outlet nozzles and underload weapons (middle) and with long-range air interdiction loadout (bottom).

Data from GlobalSecurity.org Milavia, and TaiwanAirPower.org

General characteristics

- Crew: 1
- Length: 14.21 m (46 ft 7 in)
- Wingspan: 9 m (29 ft 6 in)
- Height: 4.42 m (14 ft 6 in)
- Wing area: 24.2 m^{2} (260 sq ft)
- Empty weight: 6,486 kg (14,299 lb)
- Gross weight: 9,072 kg (20,000 lb)
- Max takeoff weight: 12,247 kg (27,000 lb)
- Powerplant: 2 × Honeywell/ITEC F125-GA-100 turbofan, 27 kN (6,100 lbf) thrust each dry, 42.1 kN (9,500 lbf) with afterburner

Performance

- Maximum speed: Mach 1.8 (1379 mph, 2,220 km/h)
- Range: 1,100 km (680 mi, 590 nmi)
- Service ceiling: 16,800 m (55,100 ft)
- Thrust/weight: 0.946(clean)/0.701(maximum load)

Armament

- Guns: 1× 20 mm (0.787 in) M61A1 6-barreled Gatling cannon
- Missiles:
  - 4× Sky Sword I
  - 4× Sky Sword II
  - 4× AIM-9 Sidewinder
  - 4× AGM-65 Maverick air-to-surface missiles
  - 2× Hsiung Feng II Anti-ship missiles (test only, never enter actual service)
  - 2x Hsiung Feng III anti-ship missiles
- Bombs:
  - 2x Wan Chien air-to-ground cruise missile
  - 10x Mark 82 bomb
  - 10x Mk-20 Rockeye II
  - 3x Mark 84 bomb

Avionics

- Radar: 1× GD-53 X-band pulse doppler (General Electric AN/APG-67(V) derivative, US military designation: APG-67(V)ERR)
- Effective scanning range:
  - Look up: 57 kilometres (35 mi)
  - Look down: 39 km (24 mi)

== See also ==
Related development:

- AIDC T-5 Brave Eagle
- General Dynamics F-16 Fighting Falcon
- KAI T-50 Golden Eagle
- Mitsubishi F-2

Aircraft of comparable role, configuration and era:

- Chengdu J-10
- Dassault Mirage 2000
- McDonnell Douglas F/A-18 Hornet
- Mikoyan MiG-29
- PAC/CAC JF-17 Thunder
- Saab JAS 39 Gripen

Related lists:

- List of fighter aircraft

== Footnotes ==
=== Sources ===
- Eden, Paul (ed.). The Encyclopedia of Modern Military Aircraft. London, UK: Amber Books, 2004. ISBN 1-904687-84-9.
- Wilson, Stewart (2000). Combat Aircraft since 1945. London: Aerospace Publications, 2000. ISBN 1-875671-50-1.
- Lake, Jon (Autumn 1996). "AIDC Ching-Kuo: The Indigenous Defence Fighter". World Air Power Journal (26). London:Aerospace Publishing: 28–41. ISBN 1-874023-81-6. ISSN 0959-7050.
- Taylor, Michael (1999). Brassey's World Aircraft & Systems Directory 1999/2000. London: Brassey's. ISBN 1-85753-245-7.
- Spick, Mike (2000). Brassey's Modern fighters: the ultimate guide to in-flight tactics, technology, weapons, and equipment. Washington, DC: Brassey's.
- Albright, David; Stricker, Andrea (2018). Taiwan's Former Nuclear Weapons Program: Nuclear Weapons On-Demand (PDF). Washington, DC: Institute for Science and International Security. ISBN 978-1727337334.
