= Waif (disambiguation) =

A waif usually refers to an orphan or a homeless young person.

Waif or WAIF may also refer to:

- The Waifs, an Australian folk rock band
- WAIF, a former community radio station in Cincinnati, Ohio
- World Aircraft Information Files, a weekly partwork magazine published in 218 issues
- The Waif, a character in the fantasy series A Song of Ice and Fire

== See also ==
- Wife
