= Robert F. Dorr =

American diplomat and author (1939–2016)

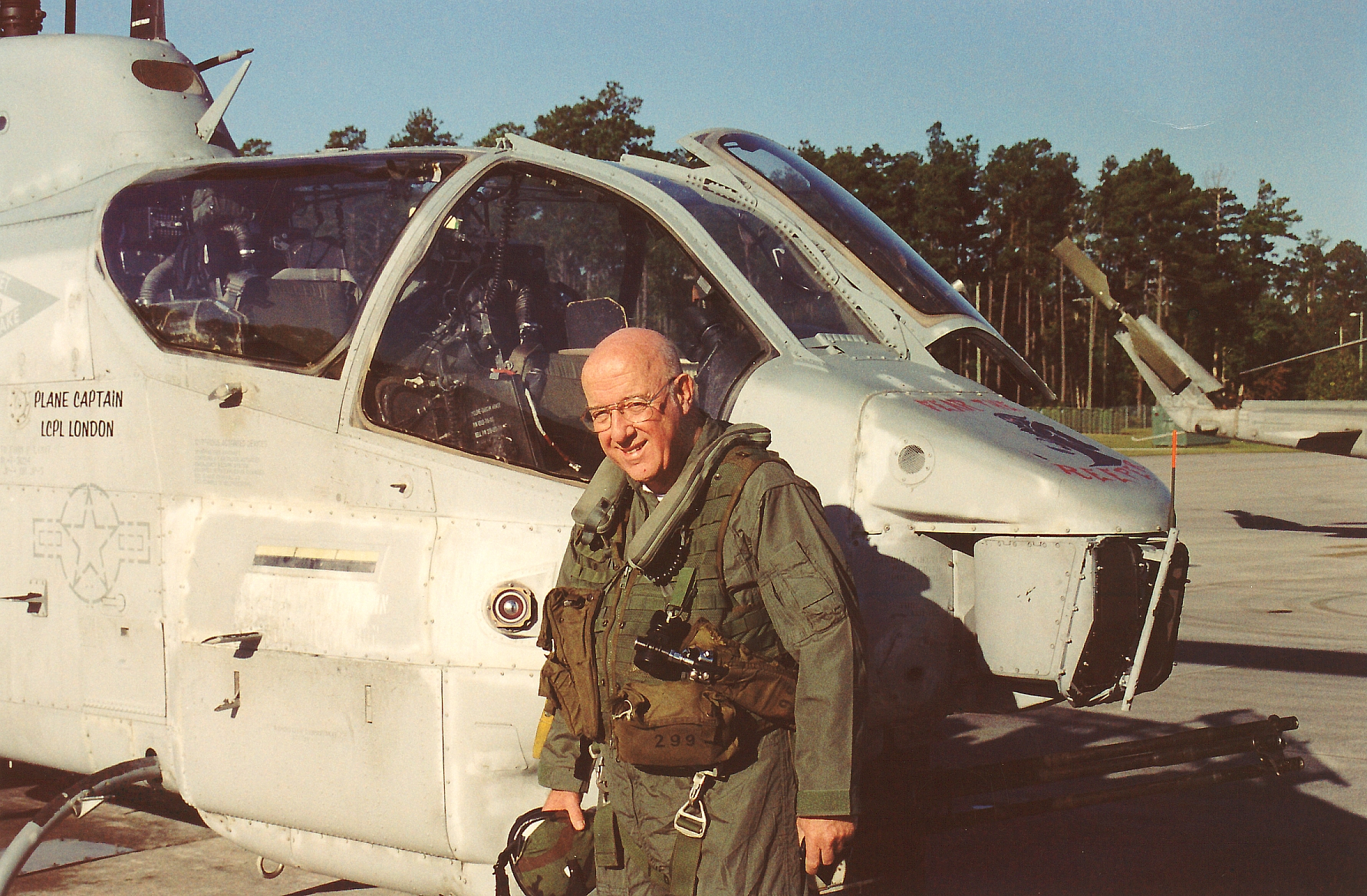
- Dorr in 2003
- Born: Robert Francis Dorr; September 11, 1939; Sibley Memorial Hospital, Washington, D.C., U.S.
- Died: June 12, 2016 (aged 76); Falls Church, Virginia, U.S.
- Education: University of California, Berkeley
- Occupations: Author, Historian, Diplomat
- Spouse: Young Soon Dorr (m. 1968)
- Writing career
- Period: 20th century
- Genres: Military history, Air Force History, Aviation History
- Subjects: World War II, Korean War, Aviation in the 20th Century
- Website: robertfdorr.blogspot.com

Robert F. Dorr (September 11, 1939 – June 12, 2016) was an American author and retired senior diplomat who wrote and published over 70 books, hundreds of short stories, and numerous contemporary non-fiction articles on international affairs, military issues, and the Vietnam War. He headed the weekly "Back Talk" opinion column for the Military Times newspaper and the monthly "Washington Watch" feature of Aerospace America. He was also the technical editor of Air Power History, the journal of the Air Force Historical Foundation, and was Washington correspondent for the discontinued World Air Power Journal.

Dorr appeared as an expert on CNN, History News Network, C-SPAN, and other national and cable television programs.

== Early life and education ==
Dorr was born in Washington, D.C., on September 11, 1939, to government workers Blanche Boisvert and Lawrence Gerald Dorr of 2800 33rd Street, Washington, D.C. In 1947, Dorr moved with his family to the nearby Maryland suburbs, where he graduated from high school. A 2017 article on Gizmodo uncovered that, at 14 years old, Dorr wrote letters to Boeing and other companies requesting photos of certain planes. Since the planes were classified at the time, the FBI opened multiple espionage investigations but ultimately concluded he was a "loyal American boy."

After high school, Dorr joined the U.S. Air Force in 1957, and served in Korea. After leaving the Air Force in 1960, Dorr attended the University of California, Berkeley.

== Career ==
In 1964, Dorr became a Foreign Service officer with the U.S. Department of State, where he was assigned as a U.S. diplomat and political officer to U.S. Embassies and Consulates in Madagascar, South Korea, Japan, Liberia, Sweden, and the United Kingdom. Dorr was fluent in French, Japanese, Korean, Russian, Swedish, and German, and retired as a Senior Foreign Service officer in 1990. He devoted the rest of his life to writing.

Dorr spent 25 years as a senior Foreign Service Officer (1964–89) with the U.S. State Department. He held senior positions in Washington, D.C., after tours of duty in Tananarive, Madagascar, Seoul, Fukuoka, Monrovia, Stockholm, and London.

Dorr published his first magazine article in 1955 at age 16. Dorr's many contributions to this genre resurfaced in A Handful of Hell – Classic War and Adventure Stories by Robert F. Dorr, a 2016 book edited by Robert Deis and Wyatt Doyle, and the compendium Weasels Ripped My Flesh!, published in 2012.

In 1978, he received a non-fiction award from the now-defunct Aviation/Space Writers Association. He regularly contributed articles to Air Forces Monthly, Air International, Combat Aircraft, Aerospace America magazine, the journal of the American Institute of Aeronautics and Astronautics (AIAA), Air & Space/Smithsonian, and Flight Journal. Dorr wrote for London-based Aerospace Publishing, initially for its magazines and later for World Air Power Journal, its journal.

Dorr's weekly opinion column in Military Times was read by about 100,000 current, former, and retired military members and their families. Dorr's opinion columns combined strong support for the military with a liberal political point of view. In a September 10, 2007, column that was widely reprinted around the United States, he called for an end to the prison camp at Guantanamo Bay, Cuba, and for treating war prisoners openly under the 1949 Geneva Convention. Before U.S. law changed to permit it, Dorr called for the military to allow homosexuals to serve openly. In other columns, he has urged veterans service organizations to get up to date to attract younger veterans and has written about what he calls the dismantling of the Air Force in an era of tight budgets.

In 2008, Dorr and former astronaut Tom Jones published a wartime history of the 365th Fighter Group, Hell Hawks. It is a history of an aerial band of brothers who went ashore at Normandy just after the June 6, 1944 D-Day invasion, fought on the continent through the Battle of the Bulge, and were still in action when Germany surrendered. These American airmen lived under crude conditions, and were subject to harsh weather and frequent enemy attacks as they moved from one airbase to another, accompanying the Allied advance toward Germany. To tell their story, Dorr and Jones interviewed 183 surviving veterans who supported, maintained, and piloted the group's P-47 Thunderbolt fighters. Hell Hawks is in its ninth printing with almost 30,000 copies in print. Referring to Hell Hawks, Walter J. Boyne, former director of the National Air and Space Museum and member of the National Aviation Hall of Fame, wrote, "Hell Hawks sets a new standard for histories of the tactical air war in Europe. Veteran authors Bob Dorr and Tom Jones combine masterfully crafted veteran interviews with the broader picture of the air war fought by the Thunderbolt men." The Experimental Aircraft Association's Warbirds magazine (July 2008) wrote, "Hell Hawks is a Stephen Ambrose-style history of a 'band of brothers' with airplanes."

Dorr was an observer of events in North Korea. Service academies, universities, and veteran's groups have used his speeches and writings on foreign affairs and Air Force history. Dorr has been interviewed on C-SPAN, Discovery Channel, CNN, and local Washington, D.C.-area newscasts. In 2010, he was given an achievement award by the Air Force Historical Foundation for his work for the foundation and its magazine, Air Power History.

In 2012, Dorr's book Mission to Tokyo about B-29 Superfortress crews in the war against Japan was published. Focused in part on the firebomb mission to the Japanese capital on the night of March 9–10, 1945, the book is based on interviews with crewmembers. Readers encounter characters as disparate as the gruff, cigar-smoking Gen. Curtis LeMay and the author and artist Yoko Ono. Walter J. Boyne wrote, "Mission to Tokyo is yet another incredible solo example of Bob's prolific scholarship and dedication to the art of writing aviation history."*

His 2013 book, Fighting Hitler's Jets, describes Nazi Germany's introduction of jet and rocket-powered aircraft into the aerial battlefields of World War II. The book also discusses the actions taken by the Allies to counter these advanced aircraft.

Dorr's book Mission to Berlin, about the Eighth Air Force raid of February 3, 1945 over Europe in World War II, was published May 1, 2011. This is primarily a history of B-17 Flying Fortress crews in one of the largest air battles of the war but it also covers Americans who flew and maintained the B-24 Liberator, P-47 Thunderbolt, and P-51 Mustang.

In January 2015, Dorr published the science fiction novel Hitler's Time Machine. The novel centers around competing groups of American and German scientists trying to perfect a working time machine in order to influence the outcome of World War II.

== Personal life ==
In 1968, Dorr married his wife, a South Korean national, in a ceremony at the home of his foreign service mentor, William J. Porter.

== Death ==
Dorr died of a brain tumor on June 12, 2016, in Falls Church, Virginia, at age 76.

== Books ==
Dorr authored or co-authored the following books:

- A Handful of Hell: Classic War and Adventure Stories by Robert F. Dorr (2016) ISBN 978-194-3-44407-6
- Air Combat: An Oral History of Fighter Pilots (2007) ISBN 0-425-21170-3
- Air Force One (2002) ISBN 0-7603-1055-6
- Air War Hanoi (1988) ISBN 0-7137-1783-1
- Air War: South Vietnam (1991) ISBN 1-85409-001-1
- B-24 Liberator Units of the Eighth Air Force (1999) ISBN 1-85532-901-8
- B-24 Liberator Units of the Fifteenth Air Force (2000) ISBN 1-84176-081-1
- B-24 Liberator Units of the Pacific War (1999) ISBN 1-85532-781-3
- B-29 Superfortress Units of the Korean War (2003) ISBN 1-84176-654-2
- B-29 Superfortress Units of World War II (2002) ISBN 1-84176-285-7
- B-52 Stratofortress : Boeing's Cold War warrior ISBN 1-84176-097-8
- Chopper: A History of America Military Helicopter Operations from WWII to the War on Terror (2005) ISBN 0-425-20273-9
- Crime Scene: Fairfax County (2016) ISBN 978-098-6-32002-6
- Desert Shield : the build-up, the complete story (1991) ISBN 0-87938-506-5
- Fighting Hitler's Jets (2013) ISBN 0-76034-398-5
- Hell Hawks! The Untold Story of the American Fliers Who Savaged Hitler's Wehrmacht (2008) with Tom Jones. ISBN 0-7603-2918-4. Zenith Press.
- Hitler's Time Machine (2015) ISBN 0-9863-2000-5 (novel)
- Korean War Aces (1995) ISBN 1-85532-501-2
- McDonnell Douglas F-4 Phantom II (1988) ISBN 0-85045-587-1
- Marine Air: The History of the Flying Leathernecks in Words and Photos (2007) ISBN 0-425-21364-1
- Mission to Berlin (2011) ISBN 978-0-7603-3898-8
- Mission to Tokyo (2012) ISBN 978-0-7603-4122-3
- U.S. Marines: The People and Equipment Behind America's First Military Response (2006) ISBN 1-59223-618-9
- Weasels Ripped My Flesh! (2012) ISBN 978-0-9884621-0-6
