= World Air Power Journal =

Aviation magazine

World Air Power Journal was a quarterly aviation magazine concentrating on modern military aviation in the period 1989 to 2000. The contents included news, military air operations, new aircraft briefings, air forces analysis and photo features and in-depth articles about particular aircraft types - usually presented in great detail, and with lavish illustration, including a gatefold centrefold with airbrushed artwork and cutaway drawings. The editors' philosophy was to include an article on a "focus aircraft" that would effectively serve as a monographic book on that subject - often running over more than 50 of the magazine’s 160 pages.

The title was published by Aerospace Publishing/Midsummer Books, a small publishing and packaging house based in West London, owned and managed by Stan Morse. The company was previously best known for publishing military, aviation and wildlife partwork magazines including The Illustrated Encyclopedia of Aircraft, War Machine, Warplane, Take Off, Airplane and World Aircraft Information Files.

World Airpower Journal lasted 43 issues before its publisher folded the title in December 2000, with the final issue being published in December 2000. A number of books were also published bearing the World Air Power Journal imprint. The US distributors of World Air Power Journal, AIRtime publishing, subsequently launched a replacement title for this publication and its companion historic aviation publication Wings of Fame called International Air Power Review.

David Donald was the managing editor, aviation for the whole period of World Air Power Journal, working under him (at different times, and on the two quarterlies) were Bob Munro, Jon Lake, Robert Hewson, Jim Winchester, Daniel March, John Heathcote and Tim Senior. Robert F. Dorr served as the magazine's Washington correspondent, while regular contributors included Bob Archer, Brad Elward, Peter Foster, Rene Francillon, Bill Gunston, Tony Holmes, Paul A Jackson, Randy Jolly, Francis K Mason, Peter Mersky, Lindsay T Peacock, Alfred Price and Tim Ripley. After World Air Power Journal folded Donald, March and Heathcote moved over to edit the new title for AIRtime.
