= Wings of Fame (magazine) =

Wings of Fame was a 160-page quarterly historic aviation magazine published as a companion to World Air Power Journal, whose coverage was limited to contemporary military aviation and air power. It was in circulation between 1995 and 2000.

== History and profile ==
Subtitled The Journal of Classic Combat Aircraft, Wings of Fame was established in 1995 by Aerospace Publishing Limited of London. The first issue appeared in November 1995. The magazine was published quarterly. It ceased publication in December 2000, with the final issue being volume 20.

The US distributors of Wings of Fame, AIRtime publishing, subsequently launched a replacement for both titles called International Air Power Review.
