= Lafay Indepedência =

Brazilian aircraft

Lafay Independência

General information
- Type: Experimental aircraft
- National origin: Brazil
- Manufacturer: Mr. Braconnot
- Designer: Louis Etienne Lafay
- Number built: 1

History
- First flight: 25 May 1922

The Lafay Independência was a Brazilian twin-engine, biplane aircraft, the first of its kind built in Latin America.

== Background ==
After unsuccessfully trying to build a multipurpose aircraft in partnership with Blackburn Aircraft. Henrique Lage, with the help of the French military attaché Louis Lafay, the Rio de Janeiro airplane was designed, of which there are no technical records about the aircraft, but it served as the basis for Indepêndencia.

== Design and development ==
With the help of an engineer named Braconnot, he built a twin-engine biplane with the capacity to carry five people on board. Built with Brazilian wood and canvas, it resembled the Caudron G.3, even though it was bigger and heavier. It used a Clerget engine push-pull type, each with two fixed pitch propellers.

== Operational history ==
The aircraft participated in the welcome flock to Gago Coutinho and Sacadura Cabral, upon their arrival in Rio de Janeiro during first aerial crossing of the South Atlantic. Her fate after June 1922 is unknown.
