= Dornier Do J Wal =

1922 multi-role flying boat family by Dornier

Do J Wal
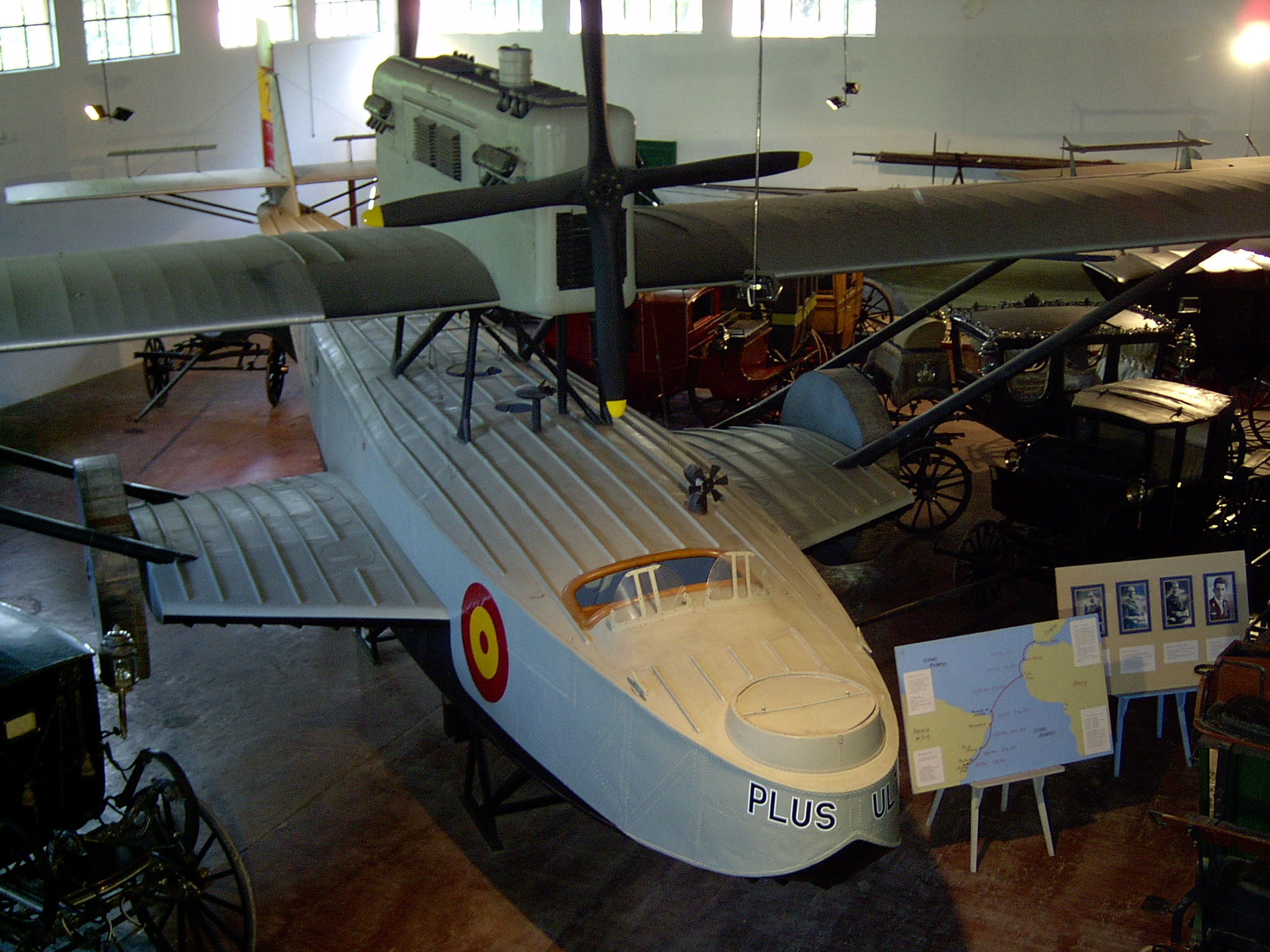
- A Spanish Dornier Do J "Plus Ultra" in Luján Museum in Buenos Aires, Argentina.

General information
- Type: Flying boat
- Manufacturer: Dornier Flugzeugwerke
- Primary user: Spain
- Number built: >250

History
- Introduction date: 1923
- First flight: 6 November 1922
- Retired: 1939

The Dornier Do J Wal ("whale") is a twin-engine German flying boat of the 1920s designed by Dornier Flugzeugwerke and manufactured in five countries. The Do J was designated the Do 16 by the Reich Air Ministry (Reichsluftfahrtministerium – RLM) under its aircraft designation system of 1933.

== Design and development ==
The Do J had a high-mounted strut-braced parasol wing with two piston engines mounted in tandem in a central nacelle above the wing; one engine drove a tractor and the other drove a pusher propeller. The hull made use of Claudius Dornier's patented sponsons on the hull's sides, pioneered on the Dornier-designed Zeppelin-Lindau Rs.IV flying boat late in World War I. The Do J made its maiden flight on 6 November 1922. The flight, as well as most production until 1932, took place in Italy because of the restrictions on aviation in Germany after World War I under the terms of the Treaty of Versailles. Dornier began to produce the Wal in Germany in 1931; production went on until 1936.

In the military version (Militärwal in German), a crew of two to four rode in an open cockpit near the nose of the hull. There was one machine gun position in the bow in front of the cockpit and one or two amidships. Beginning with Spain, military versions were delivered to Argentina, Chile and the Netherlands for use in their colonies; examples were also sent to Yugoslavia, the Soviet Union and to the end of production, Italy and Germany. The main military users, Spain and the Netherlands, manufactured their own versions under licence. Several countries, notably Italy, Norway, Portugal, Uruguay and Germany, employed the Wal for military tasks.

The civil version (Kabinenwal or Verkehrswal) had a cabin in the nose, offering space for up to 12 passengers, while the open cockpit was moved further aft. Main users of this version were Germany, Italy, Brazil and Colombia. The Colombian Air Force used Wals in the Colombia–Peru War in 1932–1933.

The Do J was first powered by two 265 kW (355 hp) Rolls-Royce Eagle IX engines. Later versions used nearly every available engine on the market from makers such as Hispano-Suiza, D. Napier & Son (the Napier Lion), Lorraine-Dietrich and BMW (the BMW VI); even the US-built Liberty V-12 engine was used. The 10 tonne-Wal used by Deutsche Luft Hansa for their mail service across the South Atlantic from 1934 to 1938 had a range of 3,600 km (2,200 mi), and a ceiling of 3,500 m (11,500 ft).

Numerous airlines operated Wals on scheduled passenger and mail services with great success. The source Robert L. Gandt, in 1991, (pages 47–48) lists the following carriers: SANA and Aero Espresso of Italy; Aero Lloyd and Deutsche Luft Hansa of Germany; SCADTA of Colombia; Syndicato Condor of Brazil; and Nihon Koku Yuso Kaisha of Japan. According to Nicolaou (1996), the Dornier Wal was "easily the greatest commercial success in the history of marine aviation".

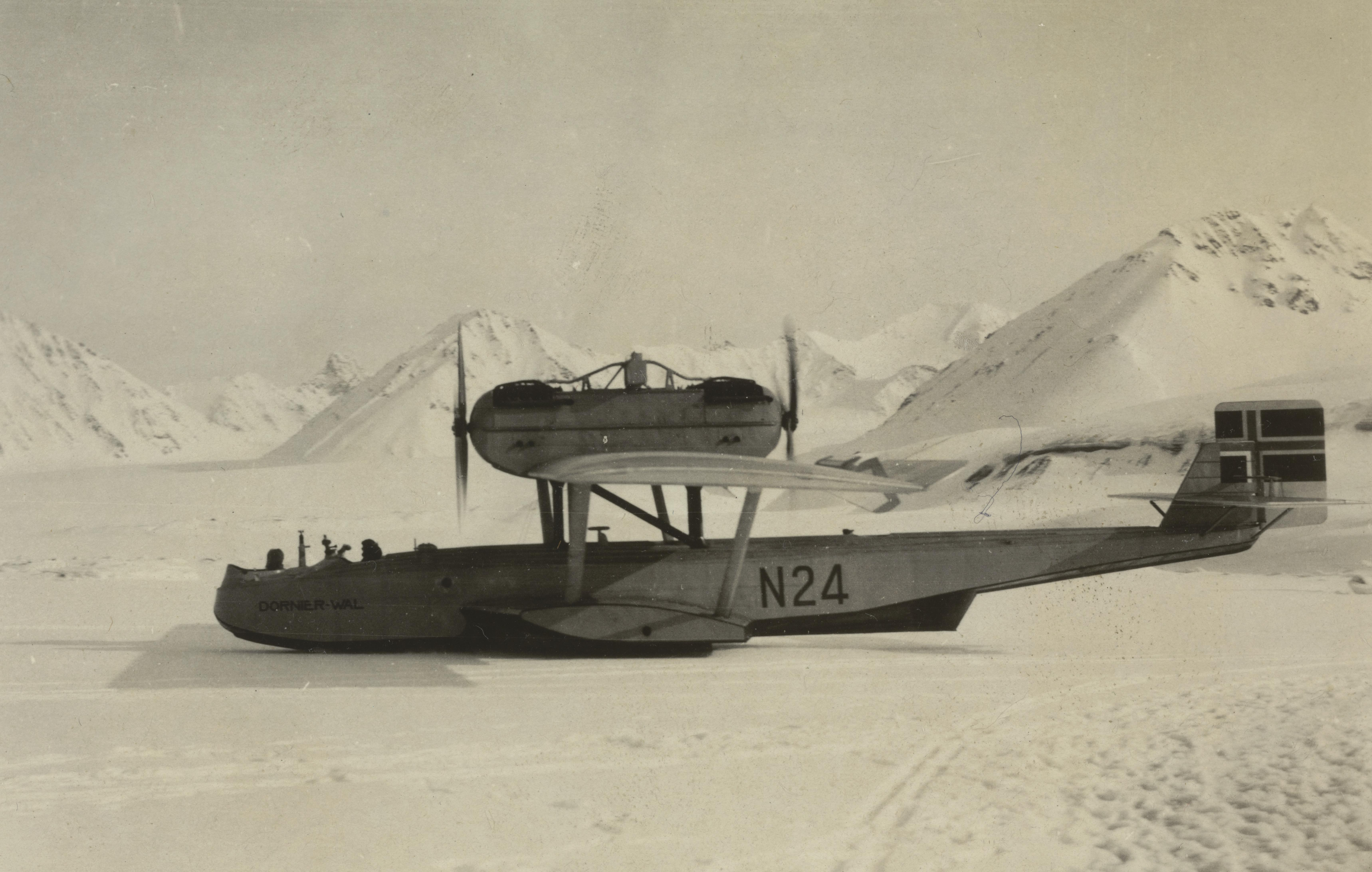
N-24 landed on the ice at Ny Ålesund

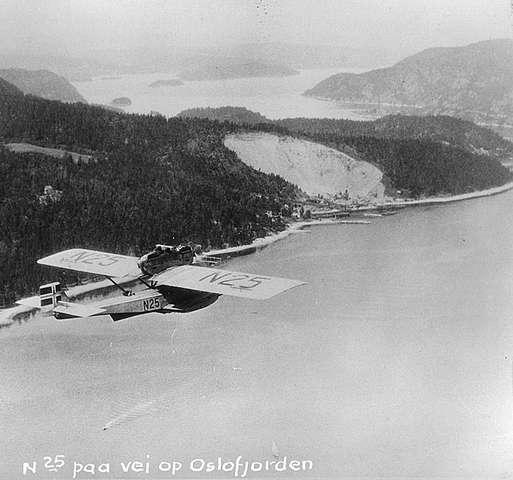
Amundsen's Dornier Do J flying over the Oslofjord, 1925

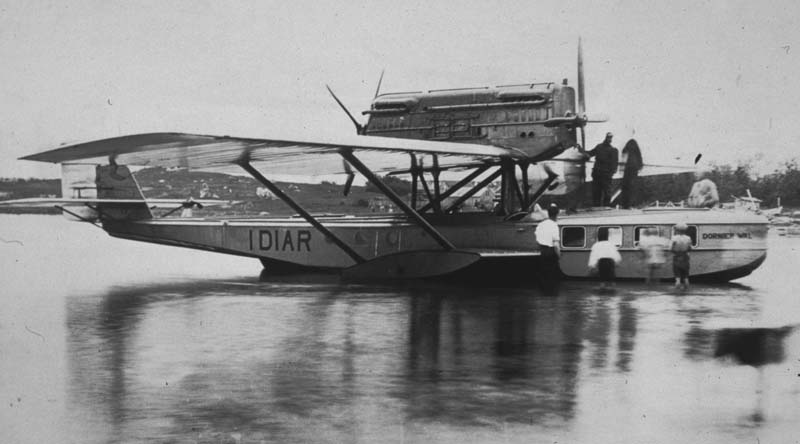
A Wal at Slite, Gotland, on the Danzig-Stockholm route in 1925

Over 250 Wals were built by CMASA and Piaggio in Italy, CASA in Spain, Kawasaki in Japan, Aviolanda in the Netherlands and Dornier in Germany. The Dornier Do 18 was a completely updated successor to the Wal but shared little more than the general configuration.

=== Pioneering flights ===
The Norwegian polar explorer Roald Amundsen accompanied by Lincoln Ellsworth, pilot Hjalmar Riiser-Larsen, and three other team members used two Wals for his unsuccessful attempt to reach the North Pole in 1925. His two aircraft, N-24 and N-25, landed at 87° 44' north. It was the northernmost latitude reached by any aircraft up to that time. The aircraft landed a few miles apart without radio contact, yet the crews managed to reunite. One of the aircraft, N-24, was damaged. Amundsen and his crew worked for over three weeks to prepare an airstrip to take off from the ice. They shoveled 600 tons of ice while consuming only one pound (454 g) of daily food rations. In the end, six crew members were packed into N-25. Riiser-Larsen took off, and they barely became airborne over the cracking ice. They returned triumphantly after widely being presumed dead.

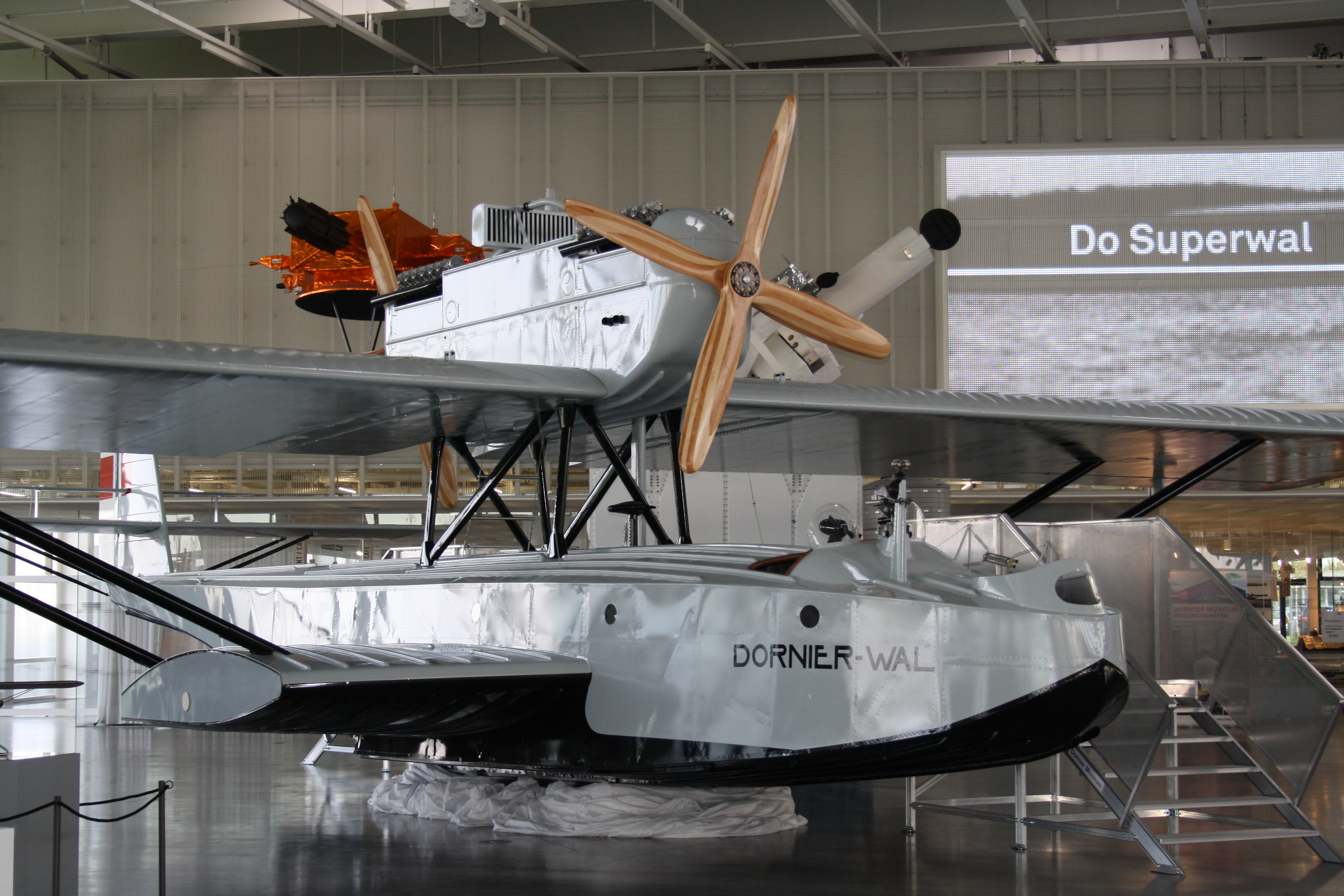
Replica Dornier Wal N25 in the Dornier Museum Friedrichshafen

On 18 August 1930, Wolfgang von Gronau started on a transatlantic flight in the same Dornier Wal (now registered D-1422) Amundsen had flown, establishing the northern air route over the Atlantic, flying from Sylt (Germany)-Iceland-Greenland-Labrador-New York 4,670 mi (7,520 km)) in 47 flight hours. In 1932 von Gronau flew a Dornier Wal (registration D-2053) called the "Grönland Wal" (Greenland Whale) on a round-the-world flight.

In 1926 the captain Ramón Franco became a national Spanish hero when he piloted the Plus Ultra on a trans-Atlantic flight, following the route pioneered by Portuguese aviators Artur de Sacadura Cabral and Carlos Viegas Gago Coutinho in the first flight across the South Atlantic in 1922. His co-pilot was Julio Ruiz de Alda Miqueleiz; the other crew members were Teniente de Navio (Navy Lieutenant) Juan Manuel Duran and the mechanic Pablo Rada. The Plus Ultra departed from Palos de la Frontera, in the Province of Huelva, Spain, on 22 January and arrived in Buenos Aires, Argentina, on 26 January. It stopped over at Gran Canaria, Cape Verde, Pernambuco, Rio de Janeiro and Montevideo. The 10,270 km (6,381 mi; 5,545 nmi) journey was completed in 59 hours and 39 minutes.

The event appeared in most major newspapers worldwide, although some of them underlined the fact that the aircraft itself, plus the technical expertise were foreign. Throughout the Spanish-speaking world, the Spanish aviators were wildly acclaimed, particularly in Argentina and Spain where thousands gathered at Plaza de Colón in Madrid.

In 1929 Franco attempted another trans-Atlantic flight, this time crashing the airplane in the sea near the Azores. The crew survived to be rescued days later by the aircraft carrier HMS Eagle of the British Royal Navy.

The Portuguese military aviator major Sarmento de Beires and his crew (captain Jorge de Castilho as navigator and lieutenant Manuel Gouveia as flight engineer) made the first aerial crossing of the Atlantic Ocean by night, in a Dornier J named Argos. The crossing was made on the night of 16–17 March 1927, from the Bijagós Archipelago in Portuguese Guinea to the Brazilian island Fernando de Noronha.

Two Dornier Wals (D-ALOX Passat and D-AGAT Boreas) also played an important role in the Third German Antarctic Expedition of 1939.

=== South Atlantic air mail ===
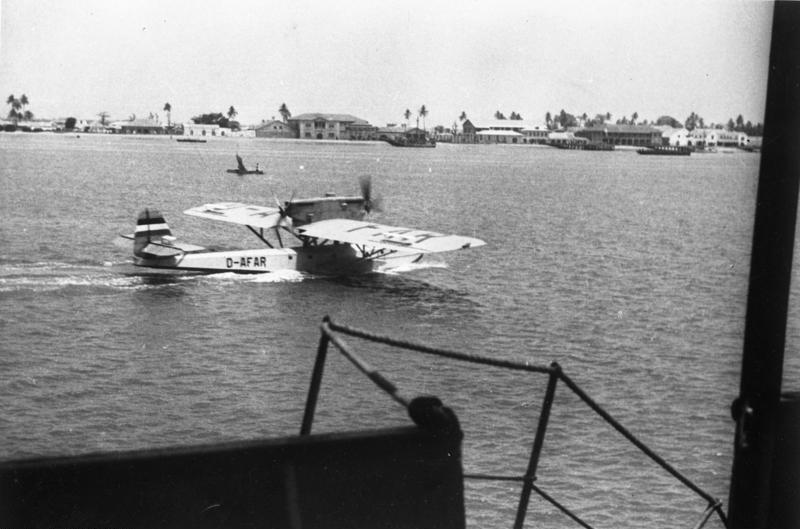
A Deutsche Luft Hansa Dornier Do J II f Bos, registered D-AFAR and named Samum, at Bathurst in the Gambia Colony and Protectorate, West Africa (1938)

The biggest and last versions of the Wal, the eight and ten tonne variants (both versions also known as Katapultwal ), were operated by Deutsche Luft Hansa on their South Atlantic airmail service from Stuttgart, Germany to Natal on the eastern tip of South America in Brazil. On route proving flights in 1933, and a scheduled service beginning in February 1934, Wals flew the trans-ocean stage of the route, between Bathurst in the Gambia Colony and Protectorate (now the Gambia) in West Africa and Fernando de Noronha, an island group off South America. At first, there was a refueling stop in mid-ocean. The flying boat would land on the open sea, near a converted merchant ship. This vessel was equipped with a "towed sail" onto which the aircraft taxied. From there it was winched aboard by a crane, refueled, and then launched by catapult back into the air. However, landing on the big ocean swells tended to damage the hull of the flying boats, especially the smaller 8-tonne Wals. From September 1934 a second merchantman was available, so that Deutsche Luft Hansa now had a support ship at each end of the trans-ocean stage, providing radio navigation signals and catapult launchings. When they did not have to take off from the water under their own power, the flying boats could carry more fuel. Once the incoming mail from Europe had arrived in West Africa (also by Wal, via the Canary Islands), the support ship would steam out to sea in the direction of South America for 36 hours before using its catapult to launch the airplane. On the return trip a Wal would fly the stage from Natal in mainland Brazil to Fernando de Noronha, and then be carried out to sea overnight. The same aircraft was then catapulted off to fly to West Africa the following morning, i.e., after twelve hours travel on the ship. From April 1935 the ships no longer carried the flying boats out to sea. The Wal was launched offshore, and flew the entire distance across the ocean. This cut the time it took for mail to get from Germany to Brazil from four days down to three.

The first ship converted to a mid-Atlantic refueling stop was the SS Westfalen, a freight and passenger liner that became out-dated for carrying mail and passengers shortly after World War I due to its small size and low cruising speed. The second vessel was the MS Schwabenland. In 1936 a new support ship went into service, the MS Ostmark, which Deutsche Luft Hansa had had purpose-built as a seaplane tender.

Wals made over 300 crossings of the South Atlantic in regular mail service (Gandt, 1991, pages 47–48). The 8-tonne Wal was not a success, only two being built. The six 10-tonne Wals flew the South Atlantic from 1934 until late 1938, although aircraft of more recent design began replacing them from 1937.

From 1925 the French airline Compagnie Générale Aéropostale operated an airmail service on much the same route, from France to Brazil. The mail was flown only as far as Dakar in Senegal, West Africa, and then shipped across the South Atlantic to Natal aboard converted destroyers. The ocean crossing alone took five days, the whole trip eight days. From 1930 Aéropostale began trying to make the ocean crossing by air, but kept losing aircraft and crews and suffered from a lack of political support. Air France, of which Aéropostale had become a part, only began operating an all air service between Europe and South America in January 1936, nearly two years after Deutsche Luft Hansa. That the Germans had succeeded in establishing the world's first regular intercontinental airline service before their competition was due, in no small part, to the sturdy and seaworthy Wal and its reliable BMW engines.

(This section is based on "Graue & Duggan", Gandt and Nicolaou.)

== Variants ==
Data from:

Do J Kas Wal
2x Hispano-Suiza engines. Transport and military flying boat.
Do J Wal
2x Rolls-Royce Eagle IX engines. Transport and military flying boat. Exported to Argentina, Chile and the Soviet Union.
Do J Wal
2x Rolls-Royce Kestrel engines. Transport and military flying boat. Exported to Yugoslavia.
Do J Wal
2x Lorraine-Dietrich engines. Transport and military flying boat. Used in the Netherlands East Indies
Do J Wal
2x Renault engines
Do J Wal
2x Farman 12Wer engines.
Do J Wal
2x Napier Lion V engines
Do J Wal
2x Rolls-Royce Eagle engines. Passenger carrying flying boat.
Do J Wal
2x Isotta-Fraschini Asso
Do J Wal
2x Fiat A.22 R engines.
Do J Gas Wal
2x Gnôme-Rhöne Jupiter engines.
Do J Bas Wal
2x BMW VI engines
Do J II Wal
2x BMW VI engines
Do J II Wal
2x Siemens Jupiter engines
Do J II Bas Wal
2x BMW VI engines. Passenger carrying flying boat.
Do J IIa Bos Wal
2x BMW VI engines. Post carrying flying boat.
Do J IIaK Bos Wal
2x BMW VI engines. Used for catapult-launched Atlantic crossings.
Do J IIb Bos Wal
2x BMW VIIa engines. "Grönland"-Wal.
Do J II Ses Wal
2x Siemens Sh 20 engines. Wal
Do J IId Bis Wal
2x BMW VI engines.
Do J IId Bis Wal
2x Curtiss Conqueror To Colombia
Do J II 16a Bis Wal
2x BMW VI engines. – Dornier Do 16
Do J IId Wal
2x BMW VI engines. – Militär-Wal
Do J IIe 16 Bos Wal
2x BMW VI engines
Do J IIf Bos Wal
2x BMW VI U engines
Do O Wal
"Atlantico" c/n 34 and "Pacifico" c/n 35 built by CMASA in Italy. Used for an expedition to South America in 1924. Shipped to and assembled on the island of Curaçao. Sold to Sindicato Condor and later to Varig. Still in use, 1936.
Do 16
re-designation of J II military Wal aircraft

== Operators ==
Argentina

- Argentine Naval Aviation

Brazil

- Varig
- Syndicato Condor

Chile

- Chilean Air Force
- Chilean Navy

Colombia

- SCADTA
- Colombian Air Force

Denmark

- Royal Danish Navy

Germany

- Condor Syndikat
- Deutscher Aero Lloyd
- Deutsche Luft Hansa

Italy

- Aero Espresso Italiana
- Società Anonima Navigazione Aerea

Japan
Netherlands

- Netherlands Naval Aviation Service

Norway
Portugal

- Portuguese Air Force

Soviet Union

- Soviet Air Force

Spain

- LAPE
- Spanish Republican Air Force
- Spanish Republican Navy

Spanish State

- Spanish Air Force
- Spanish Navy

Switzerland
Kingdom of Yugoslavia

- Yugoslav Royal Navy

== Aircraft on display ==
- Plus Ultra, at Lujan, Argentina.
- Plus Ultra replica at Museo del Aire de Cuatro Vientos in Madrid, Spain.
- Dornier Museum Friedrichshafen, at Friedrichshafen airport, Germany (full scale replica)

== Accidents and incidents ==
- 3 December 1928: a Syndicato Condor Dornier Wal registration P-BACA, crashed in Guanabara Bay while attempting to avoid a collision with another aircraft of the same company, during a celebratory flight upon the arrival of Alberto Santos Dumont in Rio de Janeiro. Ten passengers and four crew members died. This was the first accident with an aircraft registered in Brazil that had victims other than the crew and that received wide media coverage.
- 11 September 1931: a Syndicato Condor Dornier Wal registration P-BALA, while taking-off from Potengi river in Natal, collided with a boat. Three crew members died.

== Specifications (Do J Wal RR Eagle engines) ==
General characteristics

- Crew: Three
- Capacity: 8–10 passengers
- Length: 17.25 m (56 ft 7 in)
- Wingspan: 22 m (72 ft 2 in)
- Height: 5.62 m (18 ft 5 in)
- Wing area: 96 m^{2} (1,030 sq ft)
- Empty weight: 3,630 kg (8,003 lb)
- Max takeoff weight: 7,000 kg (15,432 lb)
- Powerplant: 2 × Rolls-Royce Eagle IX V-12 water-cooled piston engines, 265 kW (355 hp) each

Performance

- Maximum speed: 185 km/h (115 mph, 100 kn)
- Cruise speed: 145 km/h (90 mph, 78 kn)
- Range: 800 km (500 mi, 430 nmi)
- Service ceiling: 3,500 m (11,500 ft)
- Rate of climb: 1.5 m/s (300 ft/min)
- Time to altitude: 3,000 m (9,843 ft) in 33 minutes

== See also ==
Related lists

- List of aircraft of the Spanish Republican Air Force
- List of aircraft of World War II
- List of interwar military aircraft
- List of flying boats and floatplanes
