= Monument to the First Aerial Crossing of the South Atlantic (Alvalade) =

Monument in Lisbon, Portugal

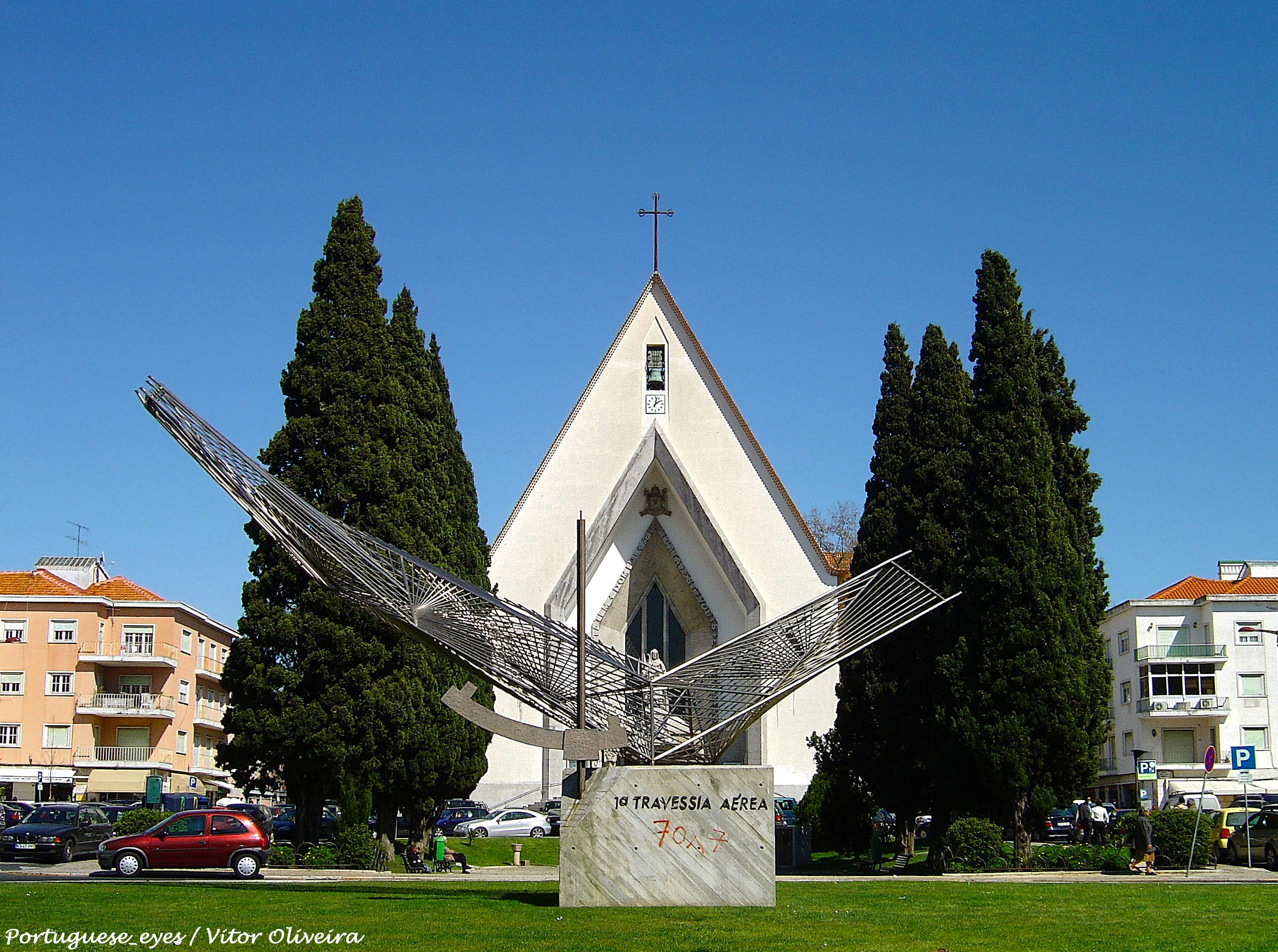
- The monument in 2015.
- Interactive map of Monument to the First Aerial Crossing of the South Atlantic
- Location: Alvalade, Lisbon, Portugal
- Coordinates: 38°45′17.22″N 09°08′20.18″W
- Designer: Laranjeira Santos; Rodrigues Fernandes
- Type: Sculpture
- Material: Stainless steel, concrete
- Opening date: 17 June 1972

The Monument to the First Aerial Crossing of the South Atlantic (Note: Portuguese: Monumento à Primeira Travessia Aérea do Atlântico Sul) is a monument in Lisbon, Portugal, within the civil parish of Alvalade, at the intersection of Igreja and Rio de Janeiro Avenues. It consists of a stainless steel sculpture of wings and a sextant placed on a concrete pedestal, and commemorates the first aerial crossing of the South Atlantic, done by naval aviators Gago Coutinho and Sacadura Cabral in 1922. It was designed by Laranjeira Santos and architect Rodrigues Fernandes, and unveiled on 17 June 1972. Originally, it was near the Belém Tower, and it was relocated to its current location in 2001.

== History ==
The monument was erected on the initiative of the Lisbon City Council, in homage to the first aerial crossing of the South Atlantic, done by naval aviators Gago Coutinho and Sacadura Cabral in 1922.

It was designed by sculptor Laranjeira Santos and architect Rodrigues Fernandes, and unveiled on 17 June 1972. Originally, it was placed in a small pond near the Belém Tower, to symbolize the ocean crossing. In 2001, it was relocated to its current location, in the centre of the roundabout, at the intersection of Igreja and Rio de Janeiro Avenues, next to the Monk Heitor Pinto Square (Portuguese: Largo Frei Heitor Pinto).

In 1991, at Brasília Avenue, near the Belém Tower, another monument dedicated to the event was unveiled, in the form of a stainless steel replica of the plane.

== Characteristics ==
The monument is placed in centre of the roundabout intersection of Igreja and Rio de Janeiro Avenues, next to the Monk Heitor Pinto Square (Portuguese: Largo Frei Heitor Pinto). It is located near the Lisbon Airport.

It consists of a stainless steel sculpture, stylized to resemble bird wings and a sextant. It is placed on a concrete pedestal. On it is an inscription that reads: "1ª Travessia Aérea do Atlântico Sul", which translates from Portuguese to "The First Areal Crossing of the South Atlantic".
