= Monument to the First Aerial Crossing of the South Atlantic (Belém) =

Monument in Lisbon, Portugal

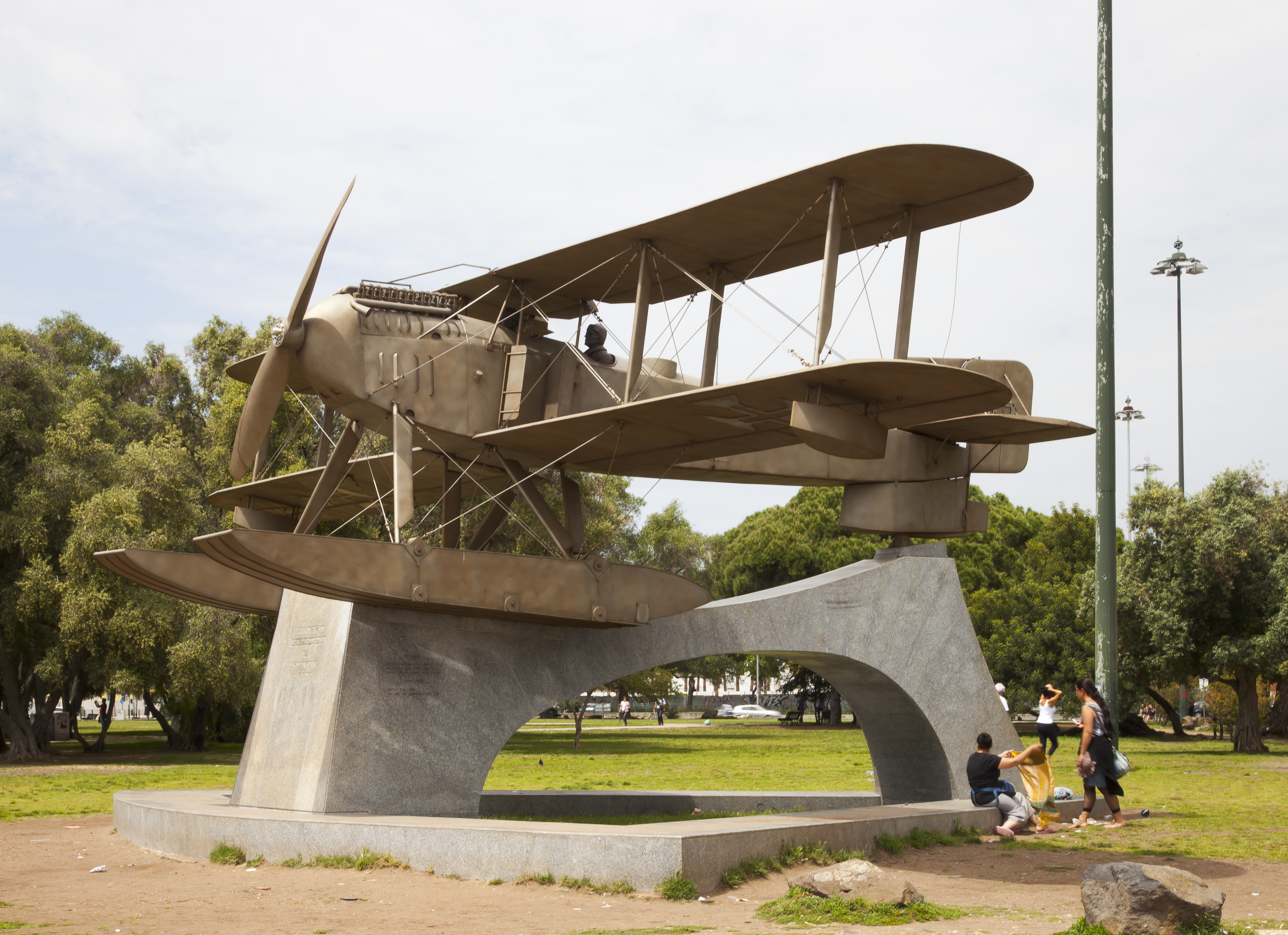
- The monument in 2012.
- Interactive map of Monument to the First Aerial Crossing of the South Atlantic (Belém)
- Location: Brasília Avenue, Belém, Lisbon, Portugal
- Coordinates: 38°41′35.93″N 09°12′47.86″W
- Designer: Martins Bairrada; Leopoldo Soares Branco; Domingos Soares Branco
- Type: Sculpture
- Material: Stainless steel
- Opening date: 1991

The Monument to the First Aerial Crossing of the South Atlantic (Note: Portuguese: Monumento à Primeira Travessia Aérea do Atlântico Sul) is a monument in Lisbon, Portugal, placed at Brasília Avenue, within the civil parish of Belém. It consists of a stainless steel replica sculpture of Fairey III biplane, that was used by Gago Coutinho and Sacadura Cabral during their 1922 South Atlantic aerial crossing. Inside are also installed their life-sized busts. It was designed by architects Martins Bairrada and Leopoldo Soares Branc, and sculptor Domingos Soares Branco, and unveiled in 1991.

== History ==
The monument was designed by architects Martins Bairrada and Leopoldo Soares Branc, and sculptor Domingos Soares Branco, and unveiled in 1991, at Brasília Avenue near the Belém Tower.

Previously, in 1972, nearby was also placed another monument dedicated to the event, which was later relocated in 2001, to the intersection of Igreja and Rio de Janeiro Avenues in Alvalade.

== Characteristics ==
The monument is placed at Brasília Avenue, near the Belém Tower. It consists of stainless steel replica sculpture of Fairey III biplane, that was used by Gago Coutinho and Sacadura Cabral during their 1922 South Atlantic aerial crossing. Inside are also placed their live-sized busts. The plane replica is mounted on concrete pedestal.
