= Plus Ultra (aircraft) =

Dornier Do J flying boat

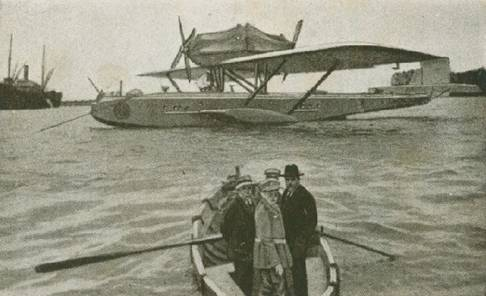
- Plus Ultra before departing Palos de la Frontera, Spain

General information
- Type: Dornier Do J
- Manufacturer: Dornier Flugzeugwerke

History
- Preserved at: Plus Ultra is preserved at the "Complejo Museográfico Provincial Enrique Udaondo", Luján, Buenos Aires Province, Argentina.

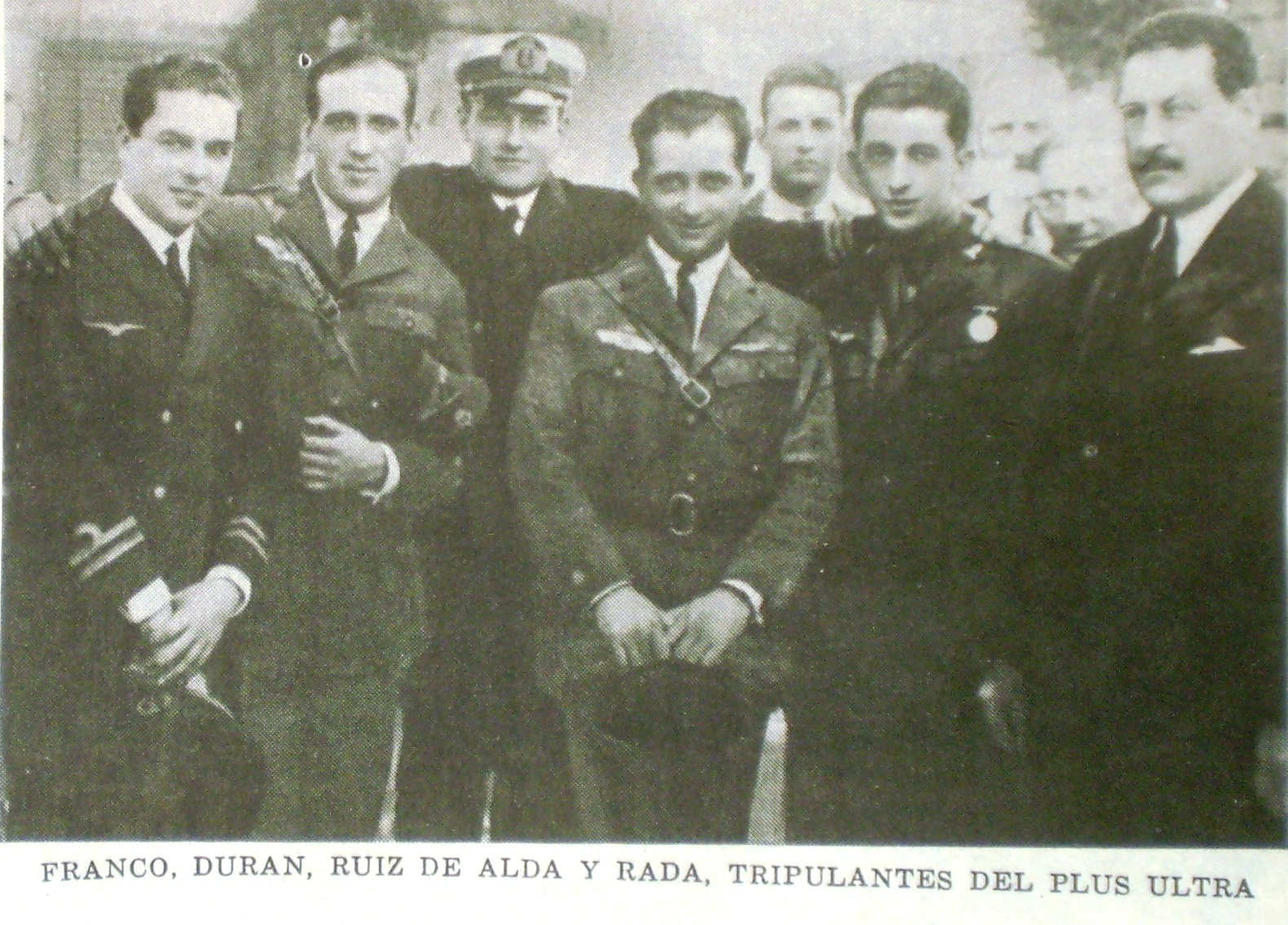
Crew of the Plus Ultra

Plus Ultra is a Dornier Do J flying boat which completed the first transatlantic flight between Spain and South America in January 1926 with a crew of Spanish aviators which included Major Ramón Franco, Captain Julio Ruiz de Alda Miqueleiz, Sub-Lieutenant Juan Manuel Durán, and the mechanic Pablo Rada.

== The flight ==
Itinerary of Plus Ultra

The Plus Ultra departed from Palos de la Frontera, in Huelva, Spain on January 22 and arrived in Buenos Aires, Argentina on January 26. It stopped over at Gran Canaria, Cape Verde, Fernando de Noronha, Pernambuco (Recife), Rio de Janeiro and Montevideo. The 10,270 km (6,381 mi) journey was completed in 59 hours and 39 minutes.

The flight of the Plus Ultra followed approximately the route taken, in 1922, by the Portuguese aviators Sacadura Cabral and Gago Coutinho, in the first Trans-Atlantic flight over the South Atlantic (from Lisbon, Portugal to Rio de Janeiro, Brazil). Cabral and Coutinho used three different Fairey III biplanes.

== Later use and preservation ==
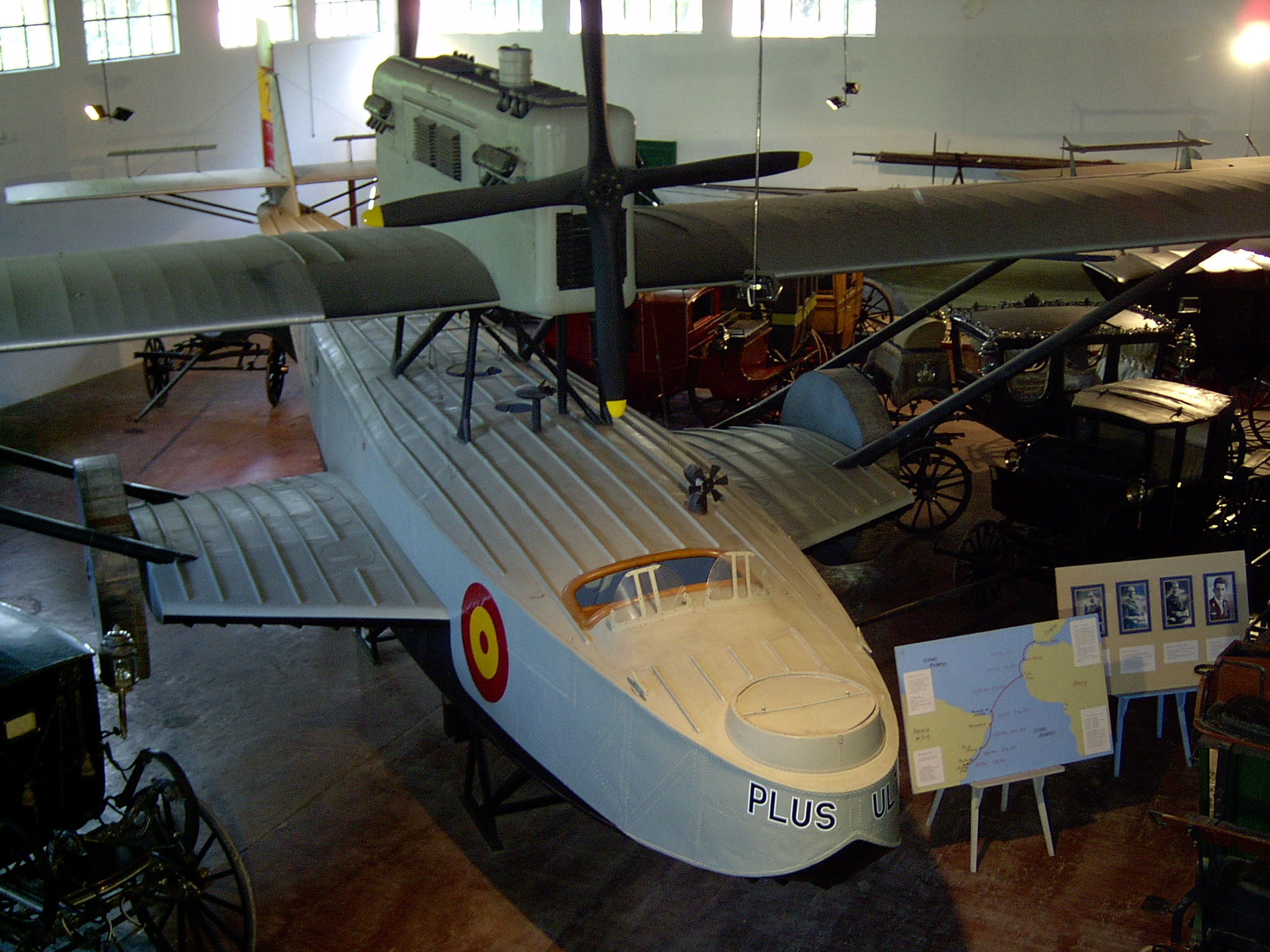
Plus Ultra in a museum in Luján, Buenos Aires Province, Argentina.

The aircraft was subsequently donated to the Argentine Navy and was used to deliver airmail.

In 1985, Plus Ultra was shipped back to Spain with the goal of restoring it to flying conditions in order to recreate the original 1926 flight. However it was soon realized this would require much more work than anticipated, and the project fell through. The plane was instead restored as a static exhibit, then shipped back to Argentina in 1988, where it is now on display in the city of Luján, Buenos Aires Province, Argentina. A replica built in 1992 also exists on display at the Museo del Aire in Madrid, Spain.

== Gallery ==
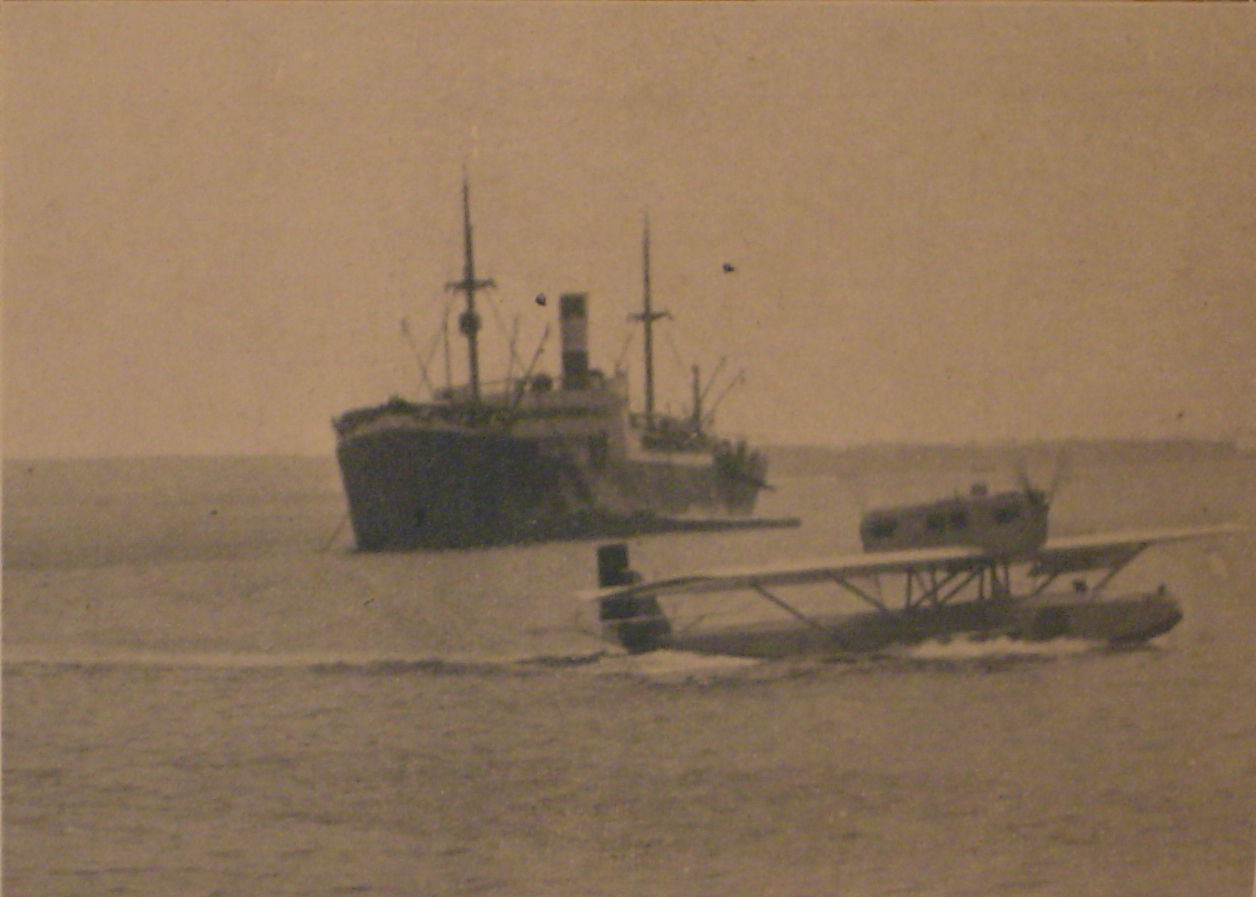
Departing from Montevideo

== See also ==
- Spirit of St. Louis
- Bird of Paradise
- Miss Veedol
- Bremen
- Question Mark
- L'Oiseau Blanc
