= Lisbon–Macau Raid =

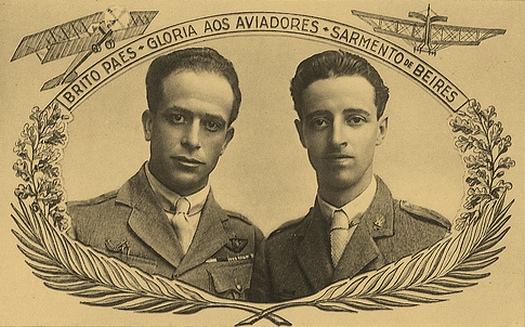
Sarmento Beires and Brito Pais

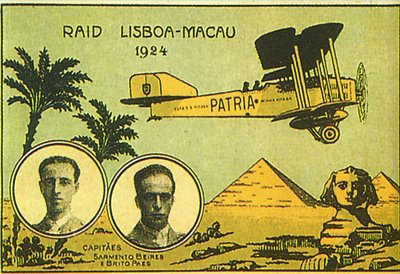
Commemorative postcard of the Lisbon–Macau Raid

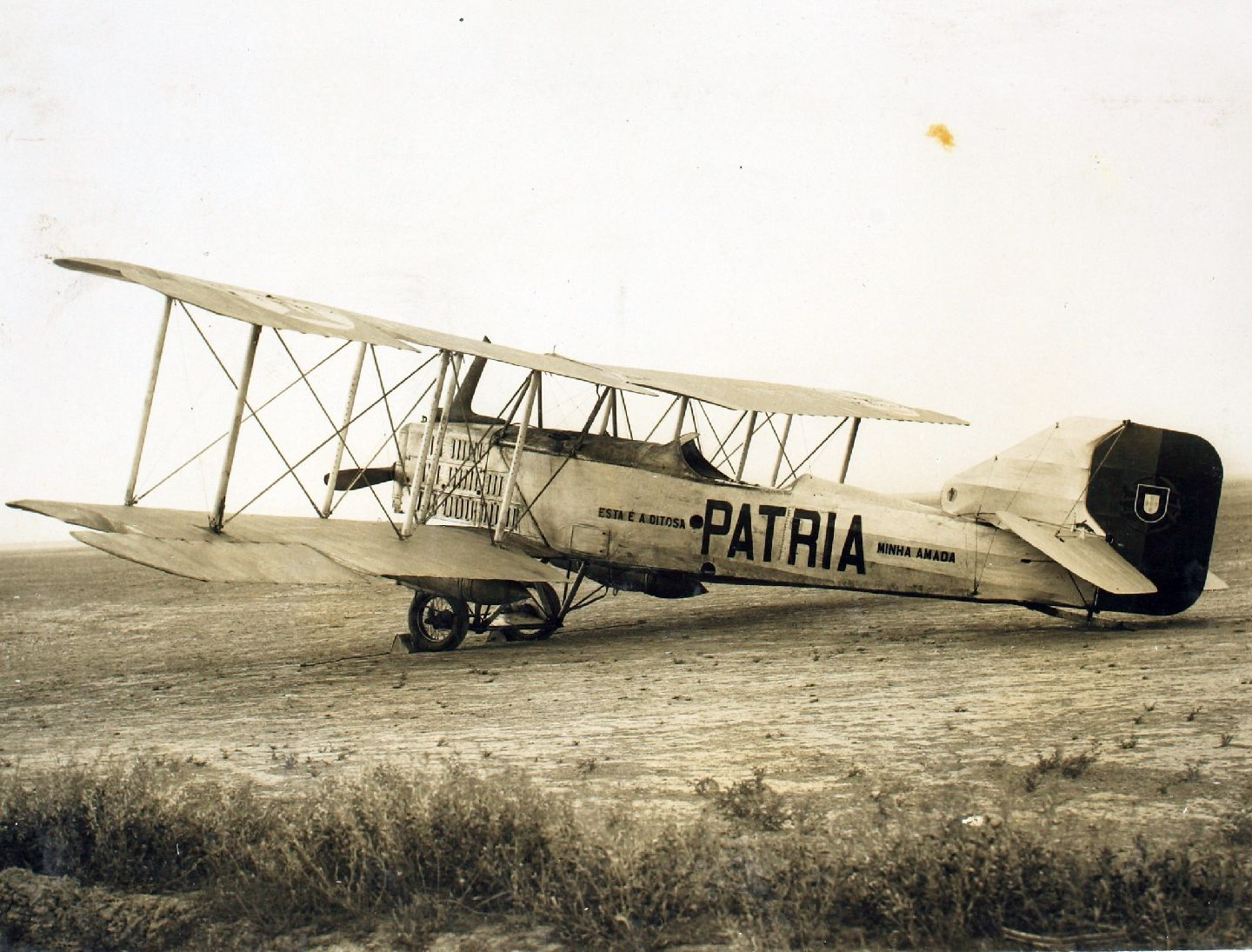
Breguet Bre.16Bn.2 Patria

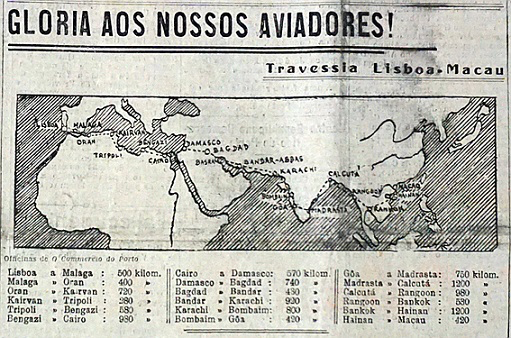
Map published in O Comércio do Porto showing the route of the Lisbon–Macau Raid

The Lisbon–Macau Raid was a 1924 air expedition by two Portuguese pilots, Sarmento de Beires and António Jacinto da Silva de Brito Pais. It was Beires' first major international flight, and it established him as a national hero in Portugal. It was intended to be a first step towards a future around-the-world flight, and a reminder of the great age of Portuguese maritime exploration. The successful journey covered 16,760 kilometers (10,414 miles) in 117 hours, 41 minutes of flight time.

== Planning ==
The idea of the raid was to link Portugal to Macau, its most distant colony, and to establish the international public image of Portugal as a dynamic country, "full of energy, vitality and spirit of initiative". The idea of the raid and all the preparations were made by the aviators themselves with popular support and with limited involvement from the Portuguese state, contributing to their heroic public image.

== Aircraft ==
The aircraft used for the first part of the journey was a Bréguet 16 recommended by Beires and Brito Pais for purchase by the Portuguese government in order to make long-range flights. The funds required were raised by public subscription. It was shipped as a kit to Amadora where it was assembled and made its first flight on 22 September 1921. Brito Pais named the airplane Pátria. A line from Os Lusíadas, "ESTA É A DITOSA PÁTRIA MINHA AMADA" ("This is my beloved Homeland") was painted on both sides of the fuselage. This aircraft eventually crashed near Karachi and had to be abandoned, though the wreck was eventually shipped back to Portugal and its engine is in the collection of the Museu do Ar.

Several weeks after the crash, they acquired another airplane, a de Havilland DH.9A which they named Pátria II. This aircraft could carry only two, so Gouveia had to continue his journey by train.

== The flight with the Patria ==
The original plan was to begin the journey from Amadora but this was changed to Vila Nova de Milfontes due to its having better conditions for a safe fully loaded takeoff. On 4 April, the aircraft was fully loaded with fuel and christened "Patria" by the bishop of Beja. However weather conditions were so bad that a takeoff was not attempted.

=== Stage 1: Lisbon–Málaga ===
Finally on the 7 April at 6:02am Brito Pais and Sarmento de Beires took off from Vila Nova de Milfontes and ascended to 700 meters. They flew over Vila Real de Santo António, the last location on their route in Portugal, and then crossed over Spanish territory. Over Huelva they were forced to down to an altitude of just 50 meters due to thick fog above. Though visibility improved, a heavy rain began to fall and Brito Pais set a route over Seville at only 30 meters of altitude. At this point the bad weather forced them to turn away from their next waypoint, Málaga, and head south-southwest to Tarifa. From there they were able to turn northeast again and head for Málaga.

Flying over the Algeciras Bay at an altitude of 800 meters the aircraft was hit by turbulence and dropped vertically for a few seconds and stalled. The pilot managed to regain control after falling 400 metres. Wind and rain continued to hinder them until they reached Málaga, where they completed the first stage of their trip, flying 632km in 4 hours 22 minutes.

=== Stage 2: Málaga–Oran ===
With reports of fair weather, the pilots took off again on 9 April at 10:31. The objective of this stage being to cross over to the shore of North Africa, they made for Melilla. Just five minutes after takeoff the fuel pump broke. This was repaired and at 11:45 the pilots sighted Cape Three Forks on the African coast. They flew over Melilla and landed at Oran, completing a 450 km stage in just 2 hours and 45 minutes.

=== Stage 3: Oran–Tunis ===
On 12 April at 07:12 the pilots took off again flying over mountainous terrain towards the city of Miliana. Just after 13:00 h they crossed into Tunisia over the city of Tabarka. From there they followed the coastline to Tunis. There they were joined by Manuel Gouveia who was to accompany them on the next stages of the expedition. Stage 3 had seen them cover 1,100 km at an average altitude of 2,200 meters.

=== Stage 4: Tunis–Tripoli ===
Brito Pais, Sarmento Beires and Manuel Gouveia took off from Tunis on 14 April at 09:03 and flew south through sandstorms towards Sfax before turning towards Djerba and Zarzis. Crossing the border, the crew landed in Tripoli at 15:53. They had flown 650 km.

=== Stages 5 & 6: Al-Khums and Benghazi ===
From Tripoli, the next objective was Benghazi. The crew set off on 16 April at 07:58, but once airborne they soon found themselves buffeted by a powerful siricco wind. After a couple of hours they decided to turn back to Tripoli but managed to land at Al-Khums.

On 18 April, with more favourable weather, they made a second attempt to reach Benghazi, taking off at 07:32. They followed the coast, their eyes burning from the sand, until they reached Benghazi at 13:50, completing the 800 km of this stage in six hours and eighteen minutes.

=== Stages 7 & 8: Cairo and Riyaq ===
On 20 April at 06:19 they took off for Cairo, once again following the coast before turning up the Nile, reaching Cairo at 15:34. With good weather, the flight had been uneventful although at 1,350km it was the longest stage they had attempted. In Cairo they enjoyed a brief stay during which they visited the pyramids and had an audience with King Fuad, On 23 April at 05:35, they burst a tyre on the runway while nearing takeoff but managed to bring the plane to a safe stop. After quickly changing the tyre they set off again at 06:30. As rain fell they flew over the Suez Canal, Gaza and Jaffa at just 200m of altitude, and as conditions improved they ascended to 300m over Haifa and Beirut. They then turned east to cross the mountains at 2,200m and the descended to land at Riyaq in the Bekaa Valley at 11:50. They had flown 760 km from Cairo in five hours and ten minutes.

=== Stages 9 & 10: Baghdad and Bushehr ===
From Riyaq, the crew set off for Baghdad at 08:05 on 26 April. They ascended to 2,800m to cross the mountains, flew over Damascus and after an uneventful trip landed in Baghdad six hours later, having covered 850 km. Manuel Gouveia worked through the night to prepare the plane for the next day. On 27 April at 07:18, due to spark plug failure after just eighteen minutes of flight, the crew turned back to Baghdad. On 28 April they tried again, following a route between the Tigris and Euphrates rivers. Reaching the coast, they sighted Bushehr at noon and made a landing there fifteen minutes later. They had traveled 860 km in six hours and five minutes, cruising at an altitude of 900 meters.

=== Stages 11, 12 & 13: Bandar Abbas, Chabahar and Karachi ===
At Bushehr there were several days of delay because the authorities insisted they have a visa in their passports before allowing them to leave, but eventually agreed to accept some money instead. As a result the crew did not take off again until 06:17 on 2 May. This stage took them over the desert to Bandar Abbas over deserts and high mountains in intense heat. The flight was straightforward however and four hours and forty-eight minutes after takeoff, they touched down at their destination. The next day they went on, departing at 05:58 for Chabahar, their last destination in Iran before crossing over to British India. The terrain and flying conditions were similar to those of the previous day, but once again they had a clear flight and covered the 500km to the end of their stage, landing at Chabahar at 09:28.

The next stage was long – 880km to Karachi. They took off early at 06:31 on 4 May but despite the hour the heat was already stifling. Shortly after passing Gwadar they encountered dense, dark clouds full of sand that completely obscured their way, forcing them down from 1,100m to just 50m. At this altitude the pilots could just distinguish between land and sea, and they flew as low as they dared as far as Sonmiani, just short of Karachi, where a powerful windstorm struck them. They were able to ascend to 200m but suffered several bouts of engine failure which forced them to prepare for an emergency landing. As they descended however they managed to restart the engine, so flew on without landing, covering the remaining 50km to Karachi in the teeth of the storm that still raged. Despite the terrible conditions the pilots made a safe landing there at 13:00 after an exhausting flight lasting six hours and twenty-nine minutes.

=== Stage 14: Karachi to Agra ===
Serious problems were encountered on the next stage of the journey. Taking off at 06:18 on 7 May, the crew soon encountered a fierce storm and could not maintain a safe altitude. After five hours and twenty minutes they were forced to make a rough landing. Their plane was damaged though they were unharmed, and local villagers took them to a railway which allowed them to take a train back to Karachi. Here they were put up by the Maharajah of the city in his palace. It was not feasible to repair a plane damaged in such a remote location, so the Patria was abandoned. The wreckage of their plane was eventually shipped back to Portugal and its engine is in the collection of the Museu do Ar in Sintra.

To continue the journey it was decided to buy another aircraft locally. The Portuguese consul in Mumbai was eventually able to procure a 1920 de Havilland DH.9A for £4,700 which they named Pátria II. The new plane was to be assembled in Lahore, so the crew headed there to continue their journey. However because they needed to carry spare parts with them, the plane could only carry two, so Gouveia, who had joined them at Tunis, had to continue the journey by rail. The plan was for him to meet Beires and Brito Pais at the end of each of the following stages to undertake maintenance and repairs.

== The flight with Patria II ==
=== Stages 15, 16 and 17: Ambala, Allahabad and Kolkata ===
The following stages of the journey went smoothly. Taking off at 06:15 on 30 May, between Lahore and Ambala the Patria II was escorted by a British aircraft flown by Lieutenant Oliver. This short stage of just 290km was achieved in two hours and five minutes despite the searing heat. The following day, also extremely hot, they flew the 800km to Allahabad in four and a half hours. After Gouveia had overhauled the plane they took off the next day for Kolkata, making 800km in four hours and fifteen minutes. Here they were met by the consuls of Portugal and Brazil and there was such great interest in their feat that they remained in the city for three days.

=== Stages 18 & 19: Akyab and Yangon ===
The next two stages were dominated by bad weather. On 4 June the crew set off for Akyab, following the coastline past Chittagong as they fought downpours and a contrary wind. After three hours and fifty five minutes they made Akyab, covering the 650km at an average altitude of 2,200m. The next day they made an attempt to head for Yangon but after one hour and fifty five minutes of flying through a thunderstorm they had covered only 260k. Prevented by thick fog from continuing, they turned back to Akyab. On 6 June they tried again, flying at 4,000m over the Arakan Mountains. Descending over Yangon they managed to land, buffeted by crosswinds, on their third attempt. They had covered 650km in just over four hours. While they were in Yangon they received a message from the Portuguese Government promoting Brito Pais and Sarmento Beires to the rank of Major and awarding them the Military Order of the Tower and Sword. Their engineer Manuel Gouveia was also promoted to the rank of Lieutenant.

=== Stages 20 & 21: Bangkok and Ubon Ratchathani ===
On 9 June at 08:40 the next stage began as the pilots took off heading for Bangkok. They ascended to 4,500m over the Dawna Range and reached Bangkok without incident, covering 680km in five and a quarter hours. On 11 June they took off again into drizzle, wind and clouds, but the flight was uneventful and they landed at Ubon Ratchathani, 550km away, after three hours and five minutes.

=== Stages 22 & 23: Hanoi and Sơn Tây ===
Though they were nearing the goal of their expedition, the final stages proved very hard for Brito Pais and Beires. On 12 June at 06:55, Patria II took off in a downpour bound for Hanoi. They flew high, at 2,500 meters, above the mountains and a blanket of cloud. They could see the South China Sea in the distance, but near Hà Tĩnh they began to have engine trouble. They considered landing early but decided to push on. Near Haiphong cloud obscured their way, forcing them right down to just 20m above the ground. They skimmed the ground like this for 100km until at noon they reached Hanoi. The runway was completely flooded but they had no choice other than to land, which they managed to do safely and without damage at 12:45. They had flown 780km in five hours and fifty minutes. Given the waterlogged ground they were not however able to take off the following day, and had to wait. By 17 June about 100m of runway was serviceable, so Brito Pais and Beires decided to lighten the Patria II of everything possible and fly her to the airfield at Sơn Tây 40km away, from where everything could be reloaded and a full length takeoff could be attempted. During this brief flight the engine failed again, necessitating further maintenance before they attempted the final stage to Macau.

=== Stage 24: Sơn Tây to Macau ===
On 20 June at 09:58 the Patria II took off into clear skies, ready to attempt the final 1,000 km to Macau. Although the weather was initially good, it worsened as they approached Macau and they soon found themselves struggling through a violent thunderstorm. As they struggled to stay in control they spotted Lapa island, just off Macau and flew over the Portuguese colony at 14:30. They overshot their destination and tried to turn back, but the weather was impenetrable and they were skimming just above the rough ocean surface. As the engine began to struggle they were forced to land where they could. They came down in open land in Fanling in British Hong Kong breaking their landing gear and propeller as they landed. Their flight was over.

In his book De Portugal a Macau (A Viagem do "Pátria") Sarmento Beires recorded that the Pátria had flown 10,960km with a total flying time of 77 hours and eleven minutes; Pátria II had flown 6610km over forty hours and thirty minutes. Altogether the pilots flew approximately 16,760km in 117 hours and forty one minutes.

== Return journey ==
The governor of Macau, Rodrigo José Rodrigues, arranged for the pilots to return home via North America. They paid calls in the Portuguese communities of Shanghai and Tokyo before crossing the Pacific to Vancouver. In the United States they visited Seattle, San Francisco, Oakland, San Jose, Sacramento, Boston, New Bedford, Providence, Fall River, New York, Newark and Jersey City. The RMS Aquitania took them from the United States to London, and then they boarded the RMS Arlanza which took them from Southampton to Lisbon, where they arrived on 9 September to a rapturous welcome.

== Legacy ==
Despite the immense popularity enjoyed by the pilots, the Lisbon–Macau Raid crossing was soon largely forgotten because Sarmento de Beires opposed the military dictatorship and the Estado Novo. However, in 1999 both Macau and Portugal issued commemorative postage stamps to celebrate the 75th anniversary of the flight. A monument in Vila Nova de Milfontes also commemorates the raid.

== See also ==
- First aerial crossing of the South Atlantic
