= João Ribeiro de Barros =

Brazilian aviator

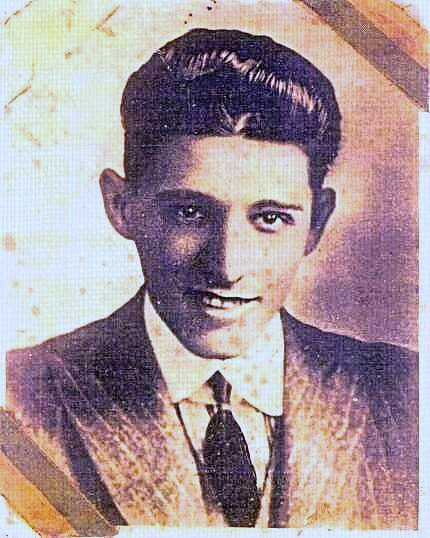
- Born: April 4, 1900; Jaú, São Paulo, Brazil
- Died: July 20, 1947 (aged 47); Jaú, São Paulo, Brazil

João Ribeiro de Barros (4 April 1900 – 20 July 1947) was the first aviator of the three Americas to make an air crossing from Europe to America, on April 28, 1927, crossing the Atlantic Ocean with the Savoia-Marchetti S.55 hydroplane Jahú. On his flight, he had the company of three others: João Negrão (co-pilot), Newton Braga (navigator) and Vasco Cinquini (mechanic). The four aviators departed from Genoa, in Italy, to Santo Amaro (São Paulo), with stopovers in Spain, Gibraltar, Cabo Verde and Fernando de Noronha, in the Brazilian territory.

== History ==
De Barros was a student of Ateneu Jauense and completed secondary school at the Instituto de Ciências e Letras of São Paulo. He was considered a good student. He ingressed in Faculdade do Largo de São Francisco (USP today).

In 1919, he abandoned school and decided to study mechanical engineering in the US. On February 21, 1923 he obtained the No.88 international brevet of Aviator International League in France. He started his pilot career in France and obtained more training in air navigation and as a pilot in the US, and air acrobatics in Germany.

In 1926, he started a project: to realize a "raid", from Italy, on board a hydroplane, to Brazil, in an independent flight without the use of ships.

== See also ==
- First aerial crossing of the South Atlantic
- Sarmento de Beires
