= Sarmento de Beires =

José Manuel Sarmento de Beires
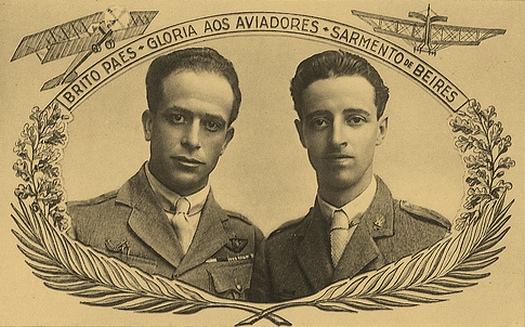
- Born: 4 September 1892; Lisbon, Portugal
- Died: 8 June 1974 (aged 81); Porto, Portugal
- Occupation: Portuguese Army officer
- Known for: First aerial crossing from Portugal to China - via Europe, North Africa and Asia - was the 2nd Eurasian aerial crossing and the first one from the Atlantic coast to China; and the first night-time aerial crossing of the South Atlantic

José Manuel Sarmento de Beires (4 September 1892 – 8 June 1974) was a Portuguese Army officer and aviation pioneer.

Sarmento de Beires became famous for piloting the first night-time aerial crossing of the Atlantic, in April 1927.

== The first night-time flight over the South Atlantic ==
The first night aerial crossing over the South Atlantic (and part of North Atlantic) was going to be made in a Portuguese Army Aviation Dornier Do J Wal metallic seaplane, with two Lorraine-Dietrich 450 hp engines, baptised as Argos. The Argos crew included Sarmento de Beires (pilot), Duvalle Portugal (co-pilot), Jorge de Castilho (navigator) and Manuel Gouveia (mechanic).

The Argos took off from the Tagus river near the Alverca military airbase, on the March 7, 1927 and arrived in Casablanca, Morocco on the same day. From Casablanca it flew to Bolama, Portuguese Guinea.

In Bolama, technical problems prevented the takeoff and the pilot Duvalle sacrificed himself, standing on the ground to ease the weight of the aircraft and allow the continuation of the journey. After other problems, Argos took off on April 16 at 18:08, heading to Brazil. Due to engine problems, the mechanic Gouveia needed to intervene twice, saving the flight. The navigator Castilho guided the aircraft to the Brazilian Rocks of Saint Peter and Saint Paul, from which she flew to Fernando de Noronha island, where they arrived at 12:20 h, totalling 2,595 kilometres on an 18-hour, 12-minute flight. Received by the warden on the island, he shouted: "We did not know anything! Furthermore, the planes do not usually arrive by air in Fernando Noronha."

The flight continued with stops in Recife, Natal and Rio de Janeiro. In the latter city, Beires recorded in his diary:We have a great record, 14 speeches in 12 hours. From Portugal, arrives a telegram with congratulations signed by Gago Coutinho.

== See also ==
- First aerial crossing of the South Atlantic
- Lisbon-Macau Raid
