= Bréguet 16 =

French WW1 bomber aircraft

16
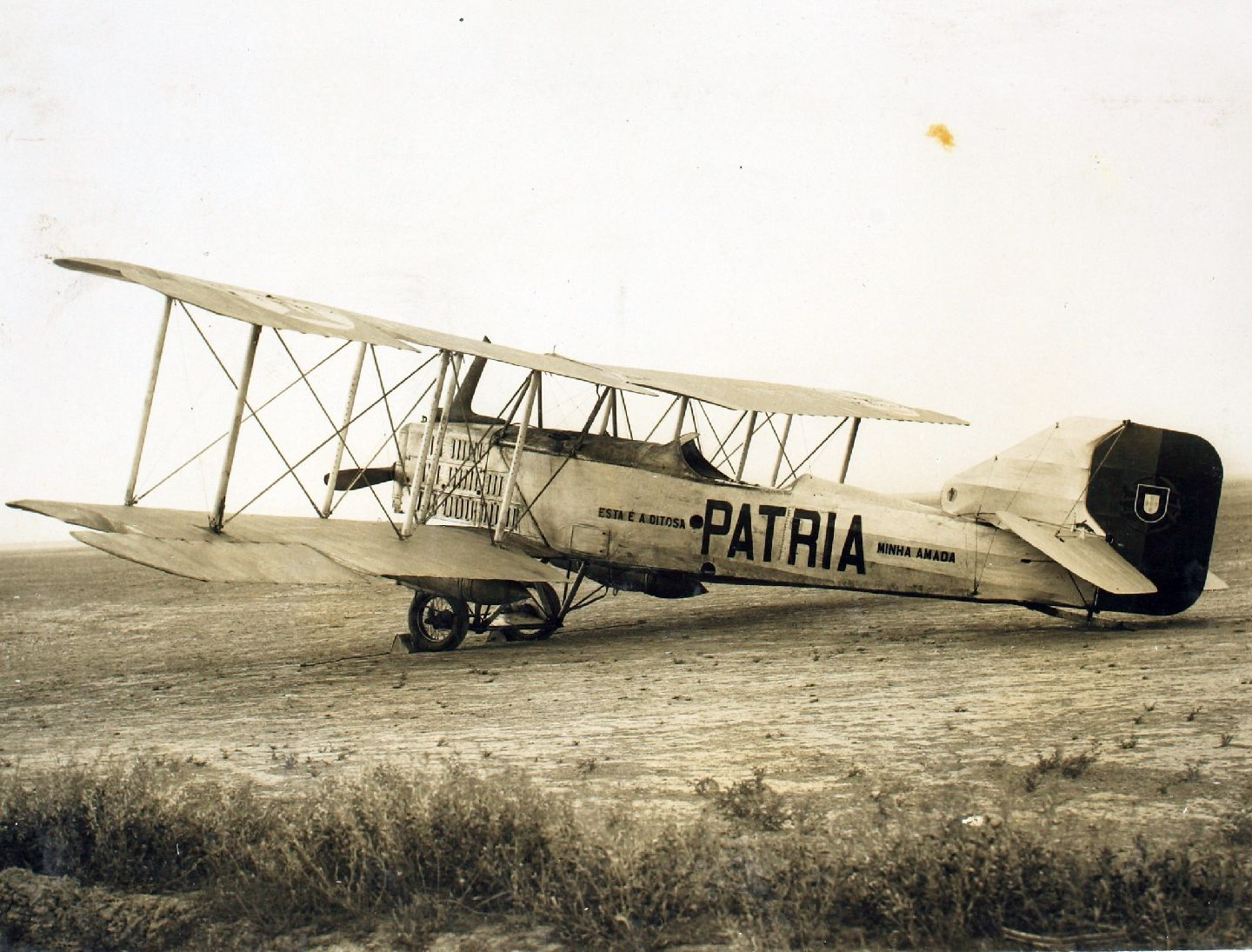
- Portuguese Bre16Bn.2 "Patria"

General information
- Type: Night bomber
- Manufacturer: Breguet
- Designer: Marcel Vuillierme
- Number built: ca. 200

History
- Introduction date: 1921
- First flight: 1 June 1918
- Retired: 1926

The Breguet 16 was a bomber biplane produced in France toward the end of World War I.

== Design and development ==
The design of the Breguet 16 was essentially a scaled-up version of Breguet's highly successful 14 — a conventionally configured biplane with two-bay, unstaggered, equal-span wings. Trials in 1918 proved promising, and mass production by several French manufacturers, under licence from Breguet, was planned for 1919. These plans were discarded upon the Armistice, but more limited production was revived in the early 1920s as the French Air Force began a programme of modernisation.

== Operational history ==
In service, the single-engine Breguet 16 was used to replace obsolete twin-engine Farman F.50s in the night bomber role as the Bre.16Bn.2. Some of the 200 aircraft built were deployed to Syria and Morocco, and Breguet also managed to sell some to the military air arms of China and Czechoslovakia. A single Breguet 16 was acquired by the Portuguese Air Force in 1924 for the Lisbon-Macau Raid, an attempted flight between Portugal and Macau, but the attempt failed, with the aircraft being destroyed in a forced landing in India.

== Variants ==
Bre.16Bn.2
Night bomber version.

== Operators ==
China

- Chinese Nationalist Air Force

Czechoslovakia

- Czech Air Force

France

- French Air Force

Portugal

- Portuguese Air Force

== Specifications ==
General characteristics

- Crew: Two, pilot and observer
- Length: 9.55 m (31 ft 4 in)
- Wingspan: 16.96 m (55 ft 8 in)
- Height: 3.32 m (10 ft 11 in)
- Wing area: 75.5 m^{2} (813 sq ft)
- Empty weight: 1,265 kg (2,789 lb)
- Gross weight: 2,200 kg (4,850 lb)
- Powerplant: 1 × Renault 12Fe , 224 kW (300 hp)

Performance

- Maximum speed: 160 km/h (99 mph, 86 kn)
- Range: 900 km (559 mi, 486 nmi)
- Service ceiling: 4,600 m (15,090 ft)

Armament

- 1 × trainable 7.7 mm (.303 in) Lewis Gun in observer's cockpit
- 550 kg (1,213 lb) of bombs
