= Juan Manuel Durán =

Mexican volleyball player (born 1951)

Personal information
- Born: 4 May 1951 (age 73); Guadalajara, Mexico

Sport
- Sport: Volleyball

Juan Manuel Durán (born 4 May 1951) is a Mexican volleyball player. He competed in the men's tournament at the 1968 Summer Olympics.
