= Lafay Rio de Janeiro =

Brazilian aircraft

Rio de Janeiro

General information
- Type: Experimental aircraft
- National origin: Brazil
- Manufacturer: Lage & Irmãos
- Designer: Louis Etienne Lafay
- Number built: 1

History
- First flight: 18 May 1920

The Rio de Janeiro was a Brazilian single-engine, biplane utility aircraft.

== Design and development ==
It was based on the Caudron G.3. Built almost entirely of wood and canvas, it had three seats. It has a Gnome et Rhône engine, of the push–pull configuration, with a fixed pitch propeller made of wood. The reinforced landing gear included four wheels and two fixed skids, with a rear skid. It was nicknamed Cochon (in English: Hog).

== Operational history ==
First flew daily, since the first flight, and was maintained without any changes, which proved its safety. Moreover, since its departure from the Lage & Irmãos workshops, it had already transported 200 passengers and made a Rio de Janeiro-São Paulo air bridge trip. Another important factor is that with two passengers on board, it reached an altitude of 2000 meters in 22 minutes.

== Specifications ==
Data from Pereira (1986)

General characteristics

- Crew: 1
- Capacity: 3
- Length: 6 m (19 ft 8 in)
- Upper wingspan: 16 m (52 ft 6 in)
- Wing area: 25 m^{2} (270 sq ft)
- Powerplant: 1 × Gnome Λ80 Lambda 7-cylinder rotary engine, 60 kW (80 hp)
- Propellers: 2 fixed-pitch propeller-bladed

Performance

- Service ceiling: 2,200 m (7,200 ft)
