= Ramón Franco =

Spanish aviator and brother of Francisco Franco

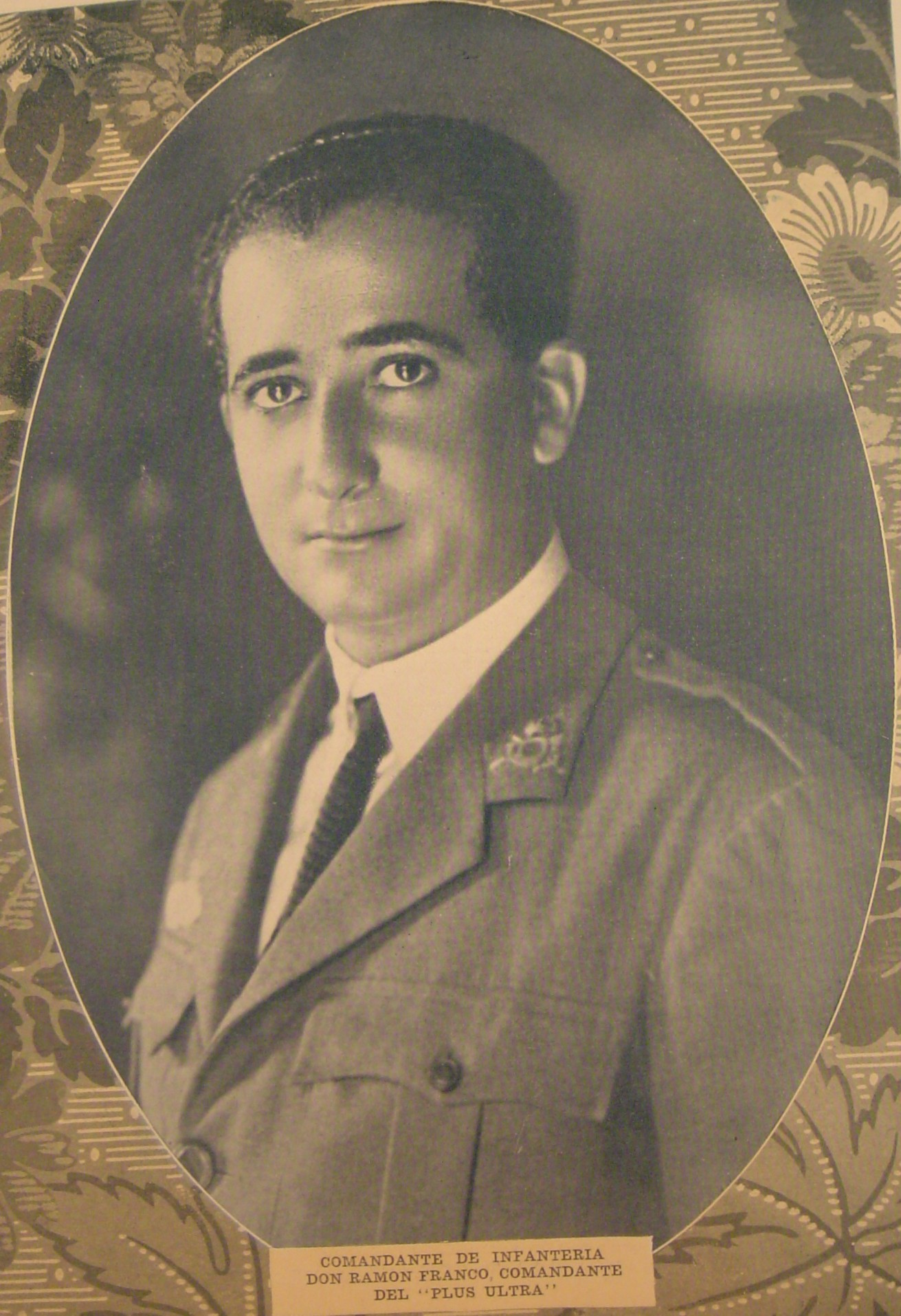
- Franco in 1926
- Born: Ramón Franco Bahamonde; 2 February 1896; Ferrol Naval Station, Galicia, Spain
- Died: 28 October 1938 (aged 42) Off the coast of Pollença, Balearic Islands, Spain
- Allegiance: Kingdom of Spain; Second Spanish Republic; Nationalist faction
- Branch: Spanish Army; Spanish Air Force
- Service years: 1914–1938
- Conflicts: Rif War; Spanish Civil War

Ramón Franco Bahamonde (2 February 1896 – 28 October 1938) was a Spanish pioneer of aviation, a political figure and brother of later caudillo Francisco Franco. Well before the Spanish Civil War, during the reign of Alfonso XIII, both brothers were acclaimed as national heroes in Spain; however, the two had strongly differing political views. They had a less-known brother, Nicolás, who was a military man like Francisco and Ramón, and also a politician.

== Aviator ==
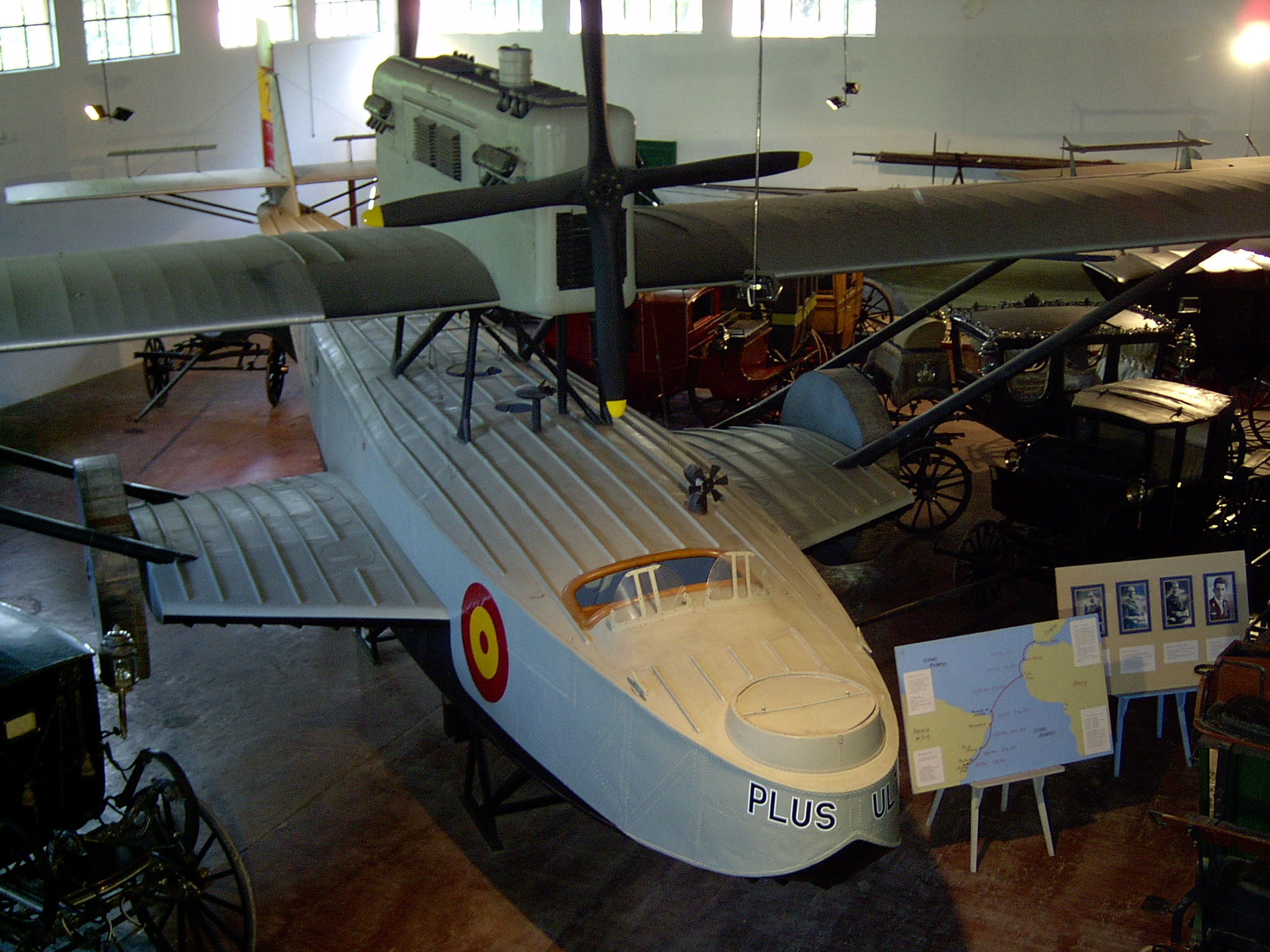
The Plus Ultra in the Luján Museum, Buenos Aires, Argentina.

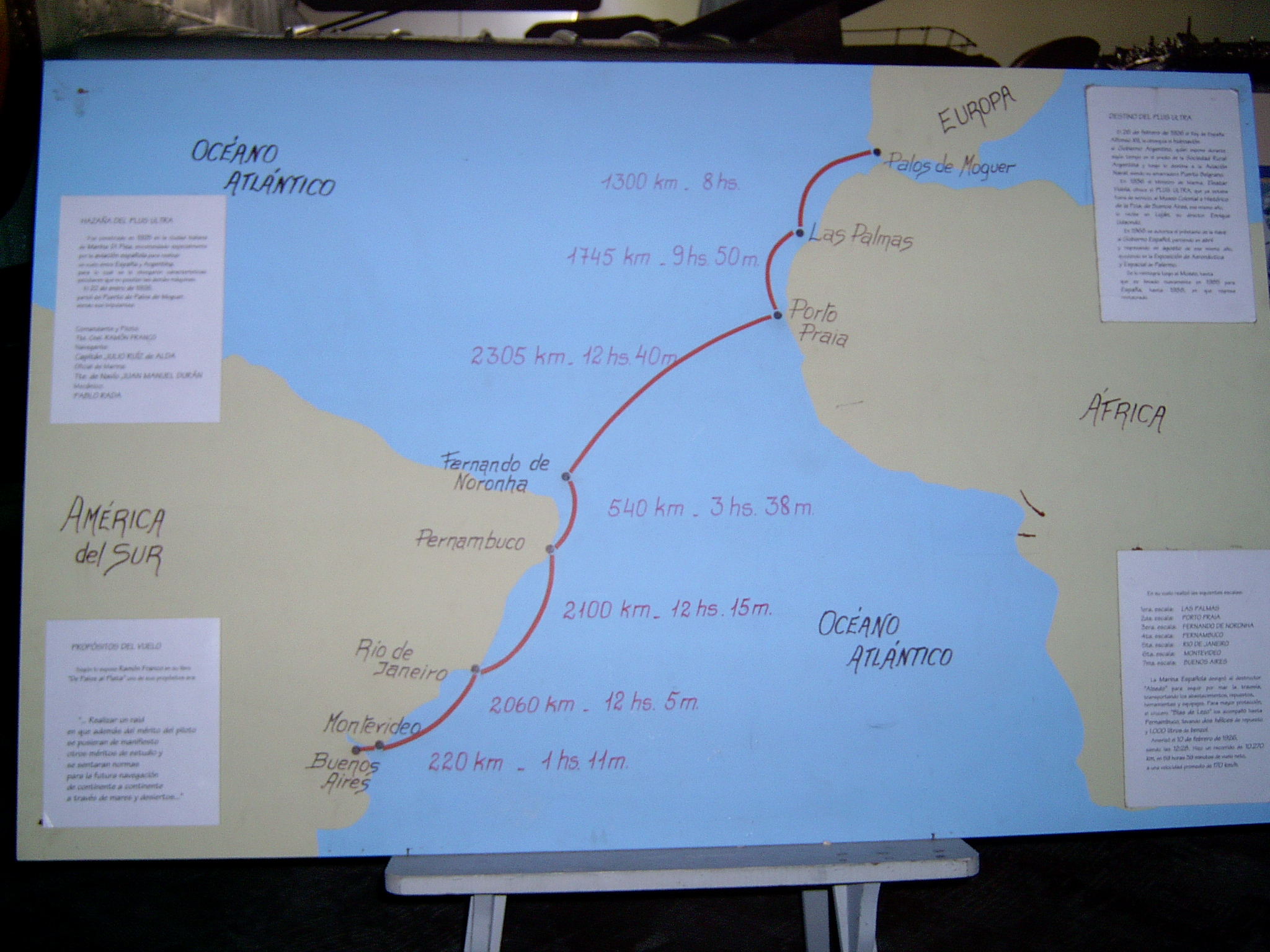
Route followed by the Plus Ultra in 1926.

Franco started his career as an ordinary successful military officer in the infantry, assigned to Morocco in 1914. In 1920 he joined the Spanish Air Force, participating in activities that earned him international attention.

Promoted to comandante (commandant), Franco became a national hero in 1926 when he piloted the flying boat Plus Ultra on a transatlantic flight. His co-pilot was Capitán (Captain) Julio Ruiz de Alda Miqueleiz; the other crew members were Teniente de navio (Ship-of-the-Line Lieutenant) Juan Manuel Duran and mechanic Pablo Rada. Plus Ultra departed from Palos de la Frontera in Huelva, Spain on 22 January and, after stopovers at Gran Canaria, Cape Verde, Pernambuco, Rio de Janeiro, and Montevideo, arrived in Buenos Aires, Argentina, on 26 January. The plane completed the 10,270-kilometre (6,381 mi; 5,545 nmi) journey in 59 hours and 39 minutes. The event appeared in most of the major newspapers worldwide. Throughout the Spanish-speaking world the Spanish aviators were glamorously acclaimed, particularly in Argentina and Spain where thousands gathered at Plaza de Colón in Madrid.

In 1929, Franco attempted another trans-Atlantic flight, this time crashing the airplane to the sea. The crew was rescued days later by the British Royal Navy aircraft carrier HMS Eagle.

== Political activism ==
During the reign of Miguel Primo de Rivera he declared himself on several occasions against the regime. He conspired against the Monarchy, inflicted losses on the army and was sent to prison, from which he was able to escape. In December 1930, along with other Republican aviators, he seized some aircraft at the aerodrome of Cuatro Vientos and flew over Madrid dropping leaflets which falsely stated a republican revolution had broken out all over Spain, calling on citizens and soldiers to aid the movement and stating that troops' quarters would be bombed shortly if they did not help in the revolution. He fled to Portugal and returned to Spain when the Second Spanish Republic was proclaimed.

Reentering the Army, in April 1931 he was named chief of a main directorate of Aeronautics. His tenure lasted 2 months; in June 1931 he was dismissed in wake of a Tablada affair, an unclear episode which gave rise to suspicion that Franco was involved in a revolutionary plot in Andalusia. He was elected as a deputy in the Cortes for Republican Left of Catalonia in Barcelona, retiring from the army and focused on politics.

== Civil War ==
When the Spanish Civil War broke out in July 1936, Franco was in the United States as the air attaché at the Spanish Embassy in Washington, D.C. Upon his return to Spain, in spite of his leftist political past, he joined the Nationalist side, of which his brother Francisco Franco was a main leader. He was promoted to teniente coronel (lieutenant colonel) and was named head of the airbase at Mallorca in the Balearic Islands. His appointment to command at Mallorca was "received very badly" by his fellow aviators, who resented that Franco, a Freemason who had been dismissed from the service, had been promoted over officers with war merits.

== Death ==
Franco was killed in an air accident on 28 October 1938, when his seaplane, a CANT Z.506, crashed off Pollença, near the coast of Mallorca, while attempting to bomb Republican-controlled Valencia. His body was found floating in the water, and his death led to rumours of conspiracies and sabotage. According to his sister, he was murdered by Freemasons who loaded bricks and mortar aboard his plane because he wanted to publish an anti-Masonic book called La burla del grado 33 (The Mockery of the 33rd Grade). After the crash, his brother Francisco, who would rule Spain after the Nationalist victory in 1939 until his death in 1975, severed most relations with his brother's widow and daughter.
