= First aerial crossing of the South Atlantic =

1922 aviation feat by Portuguese naval aviators Gago Coutinho and Sacadura Cabral

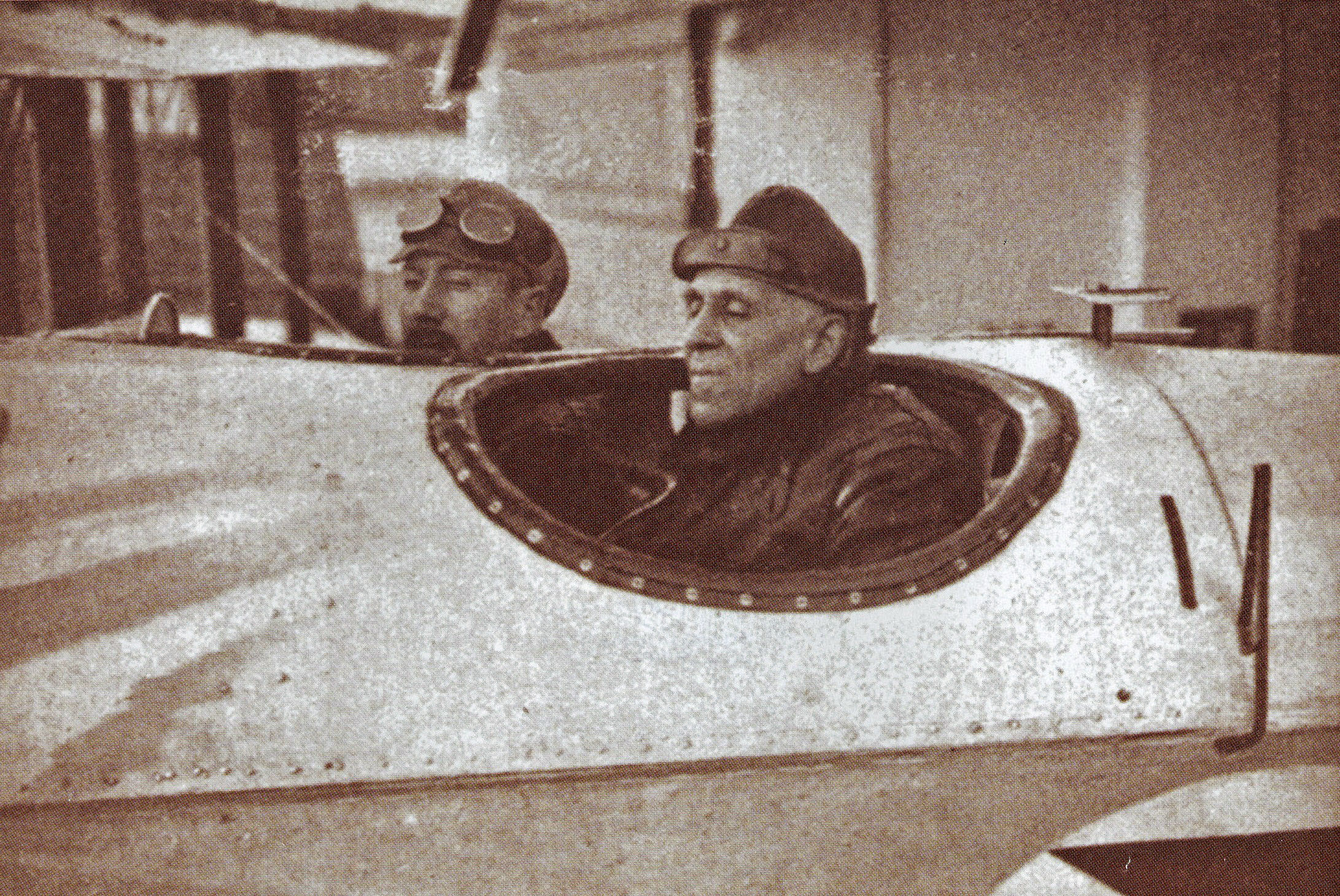
Gago Coutinho and Sacadura Cabral in the Lusitânia, the first of three Fairey III aircraft used during their 1922 journey.

The first aerial crossing of the South Atlantic was made by the Portuguese naval aviators Gago Coutinho and Sacadura Cabral in 1922, to mark the centennial of Brazil's independence. Coutinho and Cabral flew in stages from Lisbon, Portugal, to Rio de Janeiro, Brazil, using three different Fairey III biplanes, and covered a distance of 8,383 kilometres (5,209 mi) between 30 March and 17 June. Although the North Atlantic had already been traversed in a non-stop flight by John Alcock and Arthur Brown in 1919, Coutinho and Cabral's flight remains notable as a milestone in transatlantic aviation, and for its use of new technologies such as the artificial horizon.

In June 2022, the centennial of the first aerial crossing of the South Atlantic, it was announced that Faro Airport will officially change its name to Gago Coutinho Airport, in honour of Carlos Viegas Gago Coutinho.

== The journey ==
Coutinho and Cabral's transatlantic route.

=== First aircraft ===
The journey started at the Bom Sucesso Naval Air Station in the Tagus, near the Belém Tower in Lisbon, at 16:30 on 30 March 1922, in the Portuguese Naval Aviation aircraft Lusitânia, a Fairey III-D MkII seaplane specifically outfitted for the journey. The Lusitânia was equipped with an artificial horizon for aeronautical use, a revolutionary invention at the time; according to the Portuguese Navy Museum, testing the horizon was one of the main reasons for the flight.

The first part of the journey ended on the same day at Las Palmas de Gran Canaria in the Canary Islands, where the aviators noticed that the plane's fuel consumption was higher than expected. The journey resumed on 5 April, when they departed for São Vicente Island, Cape Verde, traversing 1,370 kilometres (850 mi). After making repairs on the Lusitânia, they departed São Vicente on 17 April and flew to Praia on Santiago Island, and then to the Saint Peter and Saint Paul Archipelago, already in Brazilian waters, where they arrived on the same day, after flying 1,700 kilometres (1,100 mi) over the South Atlantic. They had reached that point by relying solely on the Coutinho's sextant with its artificial horizon.

However, when ditching on the rough seas near the archipelago, the Lusitânia lost one of its floats and sank. The two aviators were saved by the cruiser NRP República, which had been sent by the Portuguese Navy to support the aerial crossing. The aviators were then carried to the Brazilian Fernando de Noronha islands.

=== Second aircraft ===
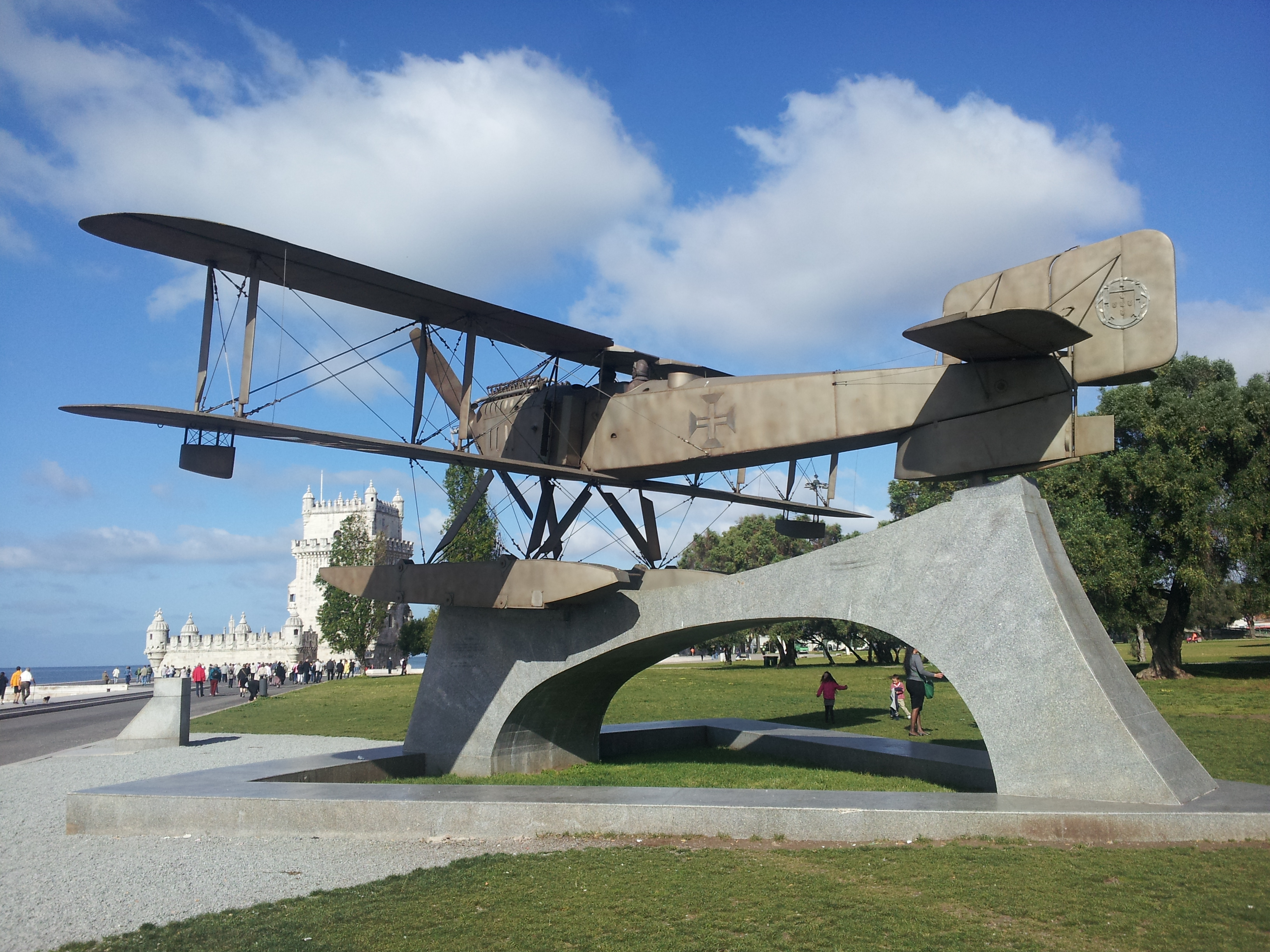
Monument to the flight in Lisbon.

Enthusiastic Portuguese and Brazilian public opinion about the flight led the Portuguese government to send another Fairey III seaplane to complete the journey. The new plane, baptized Pátria, arrived at Fernando Noronha on 6 May. After being refitted, the Pátria departed on 11 May with Coutinho and Cabral on board. They flew to the Saint Peter and Saint Paul Archipelago to resume the journey at the point where it had been interrupted. However, an engine problem forced them to once again make an emergency ditching in the middle of the ocean, where they drifted for nine hours until being saved by the nearby British cargo ship Paris City, which carried them back to Fernando Noronha.

=== Third aircraft ===
A third Fairey III – baptized Santa Cruz by the wife of Epitácio Pessoa, the President of Brazil – was sent out, carried by the cruiser NRP Carvalho Araújo. On 5 June, the Santa Cruz was put in the waters of Fernando Noronha and Coutinho and Cabral resumed their journey, flying to Recife, then to Salvador da Bahia, then to Vitória and from there to Rio de Janeiro, where they arrived on 17 June 1922, ditching in the Guanabara Bay. The two men were received as heroes by huge crowds, and were greeted by the aviation pioneer Alberto Santos-Dumont. Although their journey had lasted 79 days, the actual flight time was just 62 hours and 26 minutes. The aircraft, the only of the three that survived until today, is now on display at the Maritime Museum in Lisbon, Portugal.

== Later transatlantic flights ==
In January 1926, a Spanish team including Ramón Franco, Julio Ruiz de Alda Miqueleiz, Juan Manuel Duran and Pablo Rada made the first flight between Spain and South America in a single aircraft, the Plus Ultra. They followed a similar route to Cabral and Coutinho.

On February 22, 1927, Colonel Francesco De Pinedo, accompanied by Captain Carlo Del Prete and flight engineer Vitaliano Zacchetti, completed a non-stop flight from Porto Praia to the island of Fernando de Noronha, covering a distance of 2,610 km, on board the Savoia-Marchetti S.55 seaplane "Santa Maria". This surpassed the attempt by Franco, who had run out of fuel approximately 130 km short of Fernando de Noronha.

In October 1927, French aviators Joseph Le Brix and Dieudonné Costes performed the first nonstop aerial crossing from Saint Louis, Sénégal to Port Natal, Brazil. This was the second leg of their 187-day-long flight around the world.

Coutinho and Cabral's aerial crossing inspired numerous subsequent transatlantic pilots, such as the American Charles Lindbergh, the Brazilian João Ribeiro de Barros and the Portuguese Sarmento de Beires, all of whom crossed the Atlantic in 1927.

== See also ==
- List of firsts in aviation
- Portuguese Naval Aviation
