= Sacadura Cabral =

19/20th-century Portuguese aviation pioneer

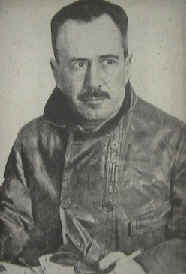
- Born: Artur de Sacadura Freire Cabral; 23 May 1881; Celorico da Beira, Portugal
- Disappeared: 15 November 1924 (aged 43); Northern Sea
- Occupation: Portuguese Navy officer
- Known for: First aerial crossing of the South Atlantic
- Parents: Artur de Sacadura Freire Cabral (father); Maria Augusta da Silva Esteves de Vasconcelos (mother)
- Military career
- Allegiance: Portugal
- Branch: Portuguese Navy

Artur de Sacadura Freire Cabral, GCTE (23 May 1881 – 15 November 1924), known simply as Sacadura Cabral (Portuguese pronunciation: [sɐkɐˈðuɾɐ kɐˈβɾal]), was a Portuguese aviation pioneer. He, together with fellow aviator Gago Coutinho, conducted the first flight across the South Atlantic Ocean in 1922, and also the first using only astronomical navigation, from Lisbon, Portugal, to Rio de Janeiro, Brazil.

== Disappearance and aftermath ==
On 15 November 1924, he disappeared while flying over the English Channel, along with his co-pilot, Mechanical Corporal José Correia, due to fog and his shortening eyesight (which never kept him from flying). Although some mechanical wreckage from his seaplane was discovered four days later, the bodies were never recovered. A statue dedicated to them is located in Lisbon. Another statue is located in his hometown, Celorico da Beira. He was the granduncle of Portuguese politicians Miguel Portas and Paulo Portas.

== See also ==
- List of people who disappeared mysteriously at sea

== Gallery ==
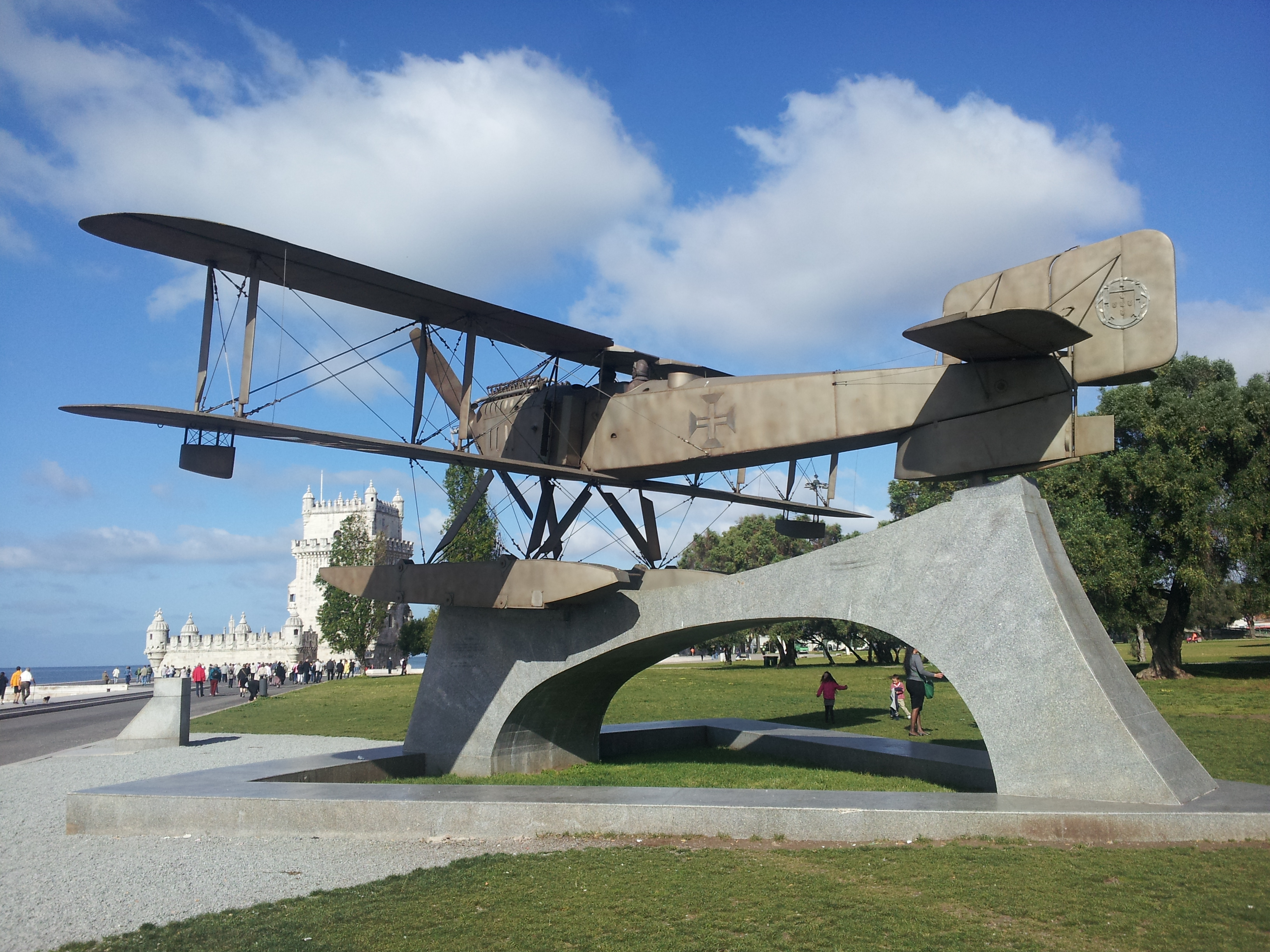
Lisbon monument to the flight

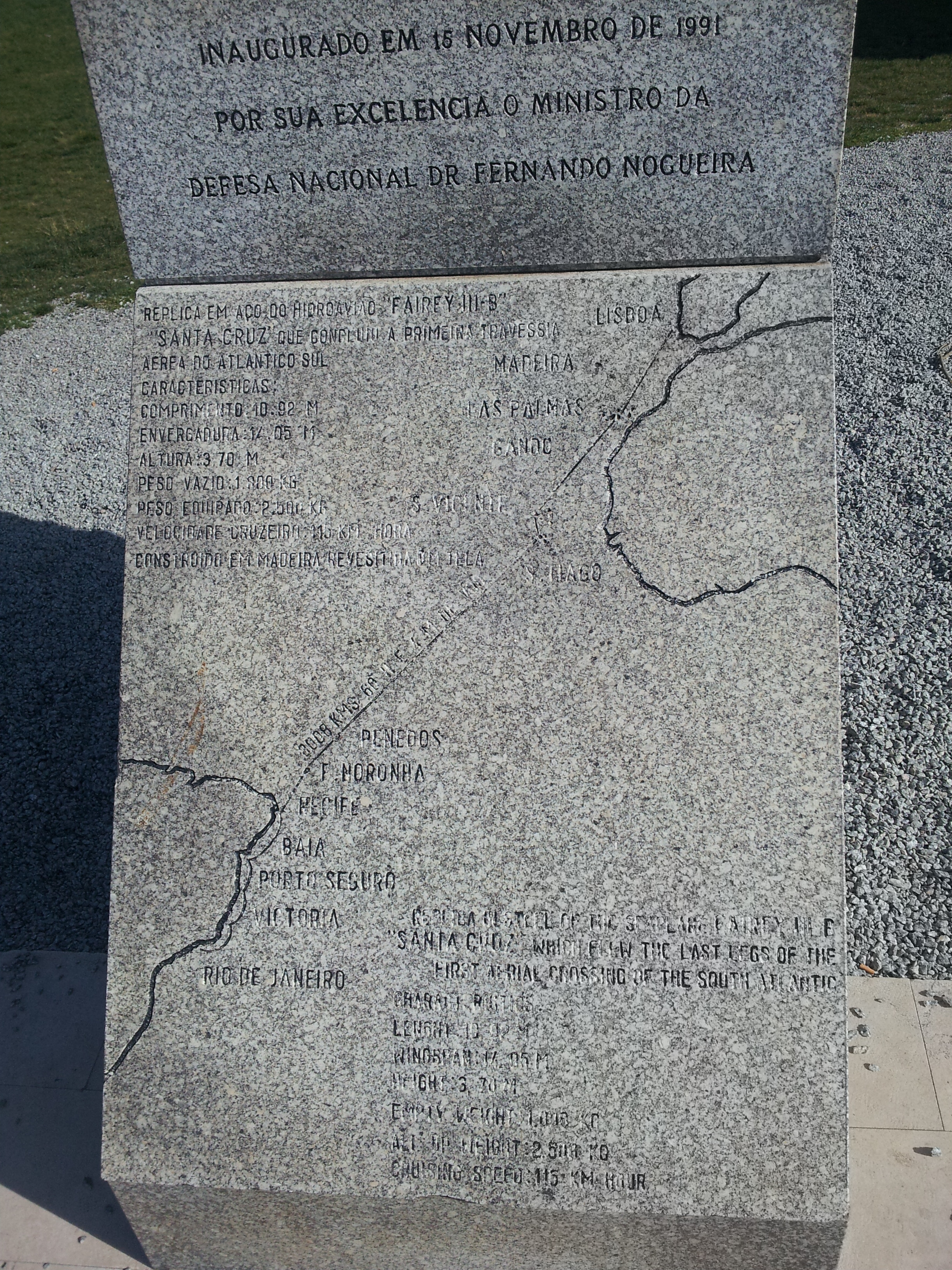
Lisbon monument of the route

Route of the first to cross the South Atlantic Ocean by air

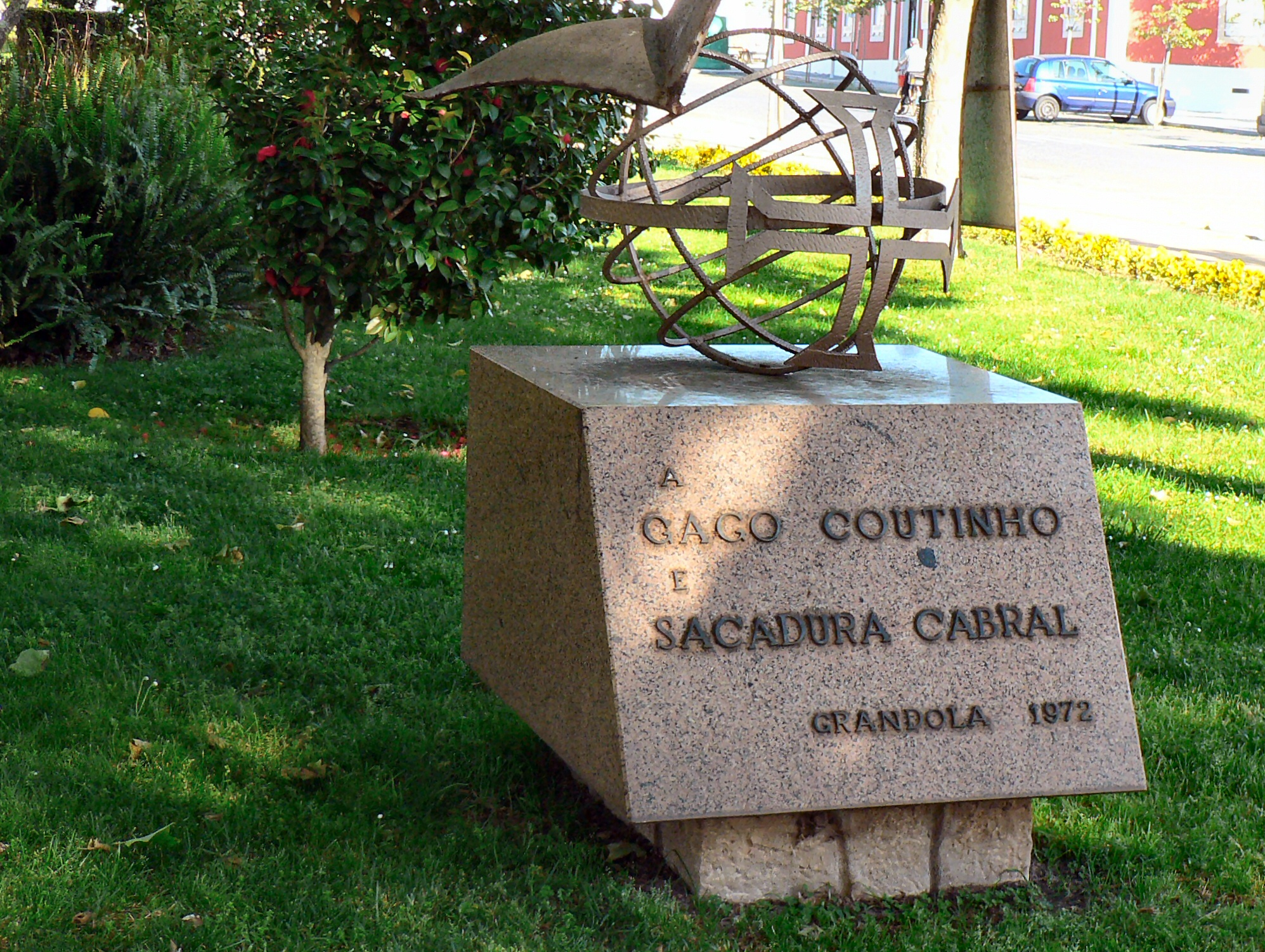
Monument to Sacadura Cabral and Gago Coutinho in Grândola (Portugal)
