= Gago Coutinho =

Portuguese naval officer and aviation pioneer (1869–1959)

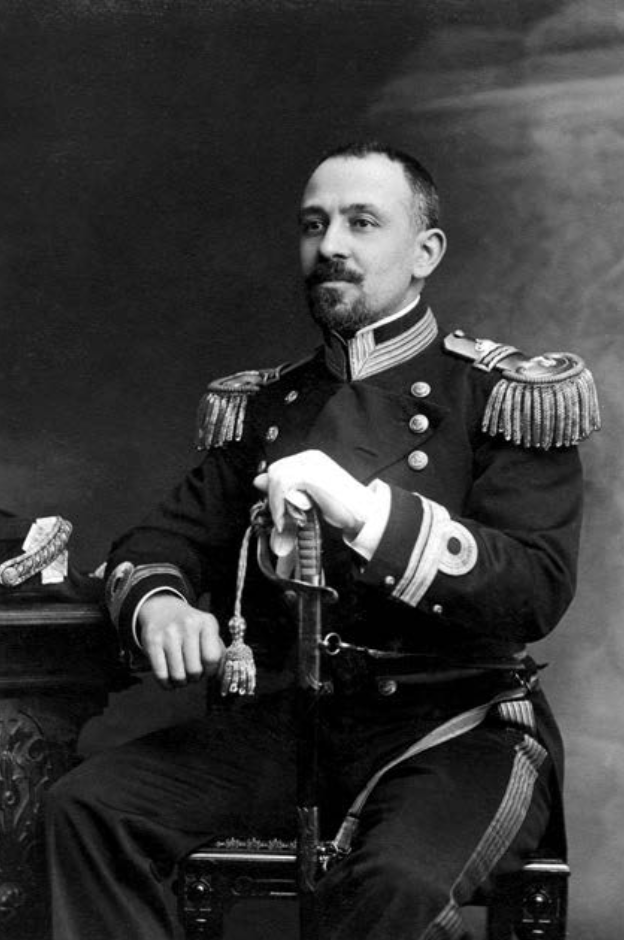
- Gago Coutinho in 1910
- Born: Carlos Viegas Gago Coutinho; 17 February 1869; Lisbon, Portugal
- Died: 18 February 1959 (aged 90); Lisbon, Portugal
- Occupation: Portuguese Navy officer
- Known for: First aerial crossing of the South Atlantic
- Military career
- Allegiance: Portugal
- Branch: Portuguese Navy

Carlos Viegas Gago Coutinho, GCTE, GCC (Portuguese pronunciation: [ˈkaɾluʒ ˈvjeɣɐʒ ˈɣaɣu koˈtĩɲu]; 17 February 1869 – 18 February 1959), generally known simply as Gago Coutinho, was a Portuguese geographer, cartographer, naval officer, historian and aviator. An aviation pioneer, Gago Coutinho and Sacadura Cabral were the first to cross the South Atlantic Ocean by air, in a journey from March to June 1922, started in Lisbon, Portugal, and finished in Rio de Janeiro, Brazil, using a seaplane variant of the British reconnaissance biplane Fairey III.

In June 2022, the centenary of the first aerial crossing of the South Atlantic, it was announced that Faro Airport would officially change its name to Gago Coutinho Airport.

== Early life ==
He was born in Belém, Lisbon, in a modest family, the son of José Viegas Gago Coutinho and his cousin, Fortunata Maria Coutinho. He finished high school in 1885, and entered the Polytechnic School, where he studied for one year, as preparation for his entrance at the Naval School, in Alfeite, Almada, in 1886.

== Naval and geographical career ==
He joined the Navy in 1886 as an aspirant. In 1890, he was promoted to marine guard, in 1891 to second lieutenant, and in 1895 to first lieutenant. In 1907 he was promoted to captain-lieutenant and in 1915 to frigate captain. In 1920 he became captain of sea-and-war. In 1922 he was promoted to vice-admiral, and in 1958 to admiral. During his first Navy years, he did several travels, being the first in the corvette "Afonso de Albuquerque", from 7 December 1888 to 16 January 1891, where he traveled to Mozambique as a member of the Naval Division of Eastern Africa. He did several naval travels the following years, until 31 March 1898, when he did his first commission as an overseas geographer, in Portuguese Timor. Since March 1898, Gago Coutinho activities were developed mostly at the Cartography Commission, created in 1883. From 27 July 1898 to 19 April 1899, he was involved in field work, working at the delimitation of the borders and at the survey of the geographical chart of the most remote Portuguese colony. After his return to Portugal, he was assigned to work at the delimitation of the borders of Niassa territory in Mozambique, from 5 September 1900 to 28 February 1901. He then moved to Angola, where he worked at the delimitation of Noqui's borders, until the end of 1901. He returned to Mozambique, working for the borders delimitation in Tete district, between 27 February 1904 and 18 December 1905.

Gago Coutinho was nominated head of the Geodesical Mission of Eastern Africa in May 1907, a post he held until the beginning of 1911. It was during this assignment that he met Portuguese aviator pioneer Artur de Sacadura Cabral, who become his close friend and who would be his mentor for future aviation projects. Afterwards, he led the Portuguese mission that delimited Angola borders in Barotze, which was formed in 1912. The year after his return to Portugal, he was nominated the head of the Geodesical Mission of São Tomé and Príncipe, in 1915, which he was until middle 1919. In 1917, Gago Coutinho and Artur de Sacadura Cabral did their first flights together. In 1919, encouraged by his friend, he started to dedicate himself to the improvement of the aerial navigation methods. They took several flights together to study the methods, the most important was the first flight from Lisbon to Funchal, in 1919. Artur de Sacadura Cabral had already delineated by them the project of making the first aerial crossing of the South Atlantic, meant to take place in 1922, the year of the centennial of the independence of Brazil.

== First aerial crossing of the South Atlantic ==
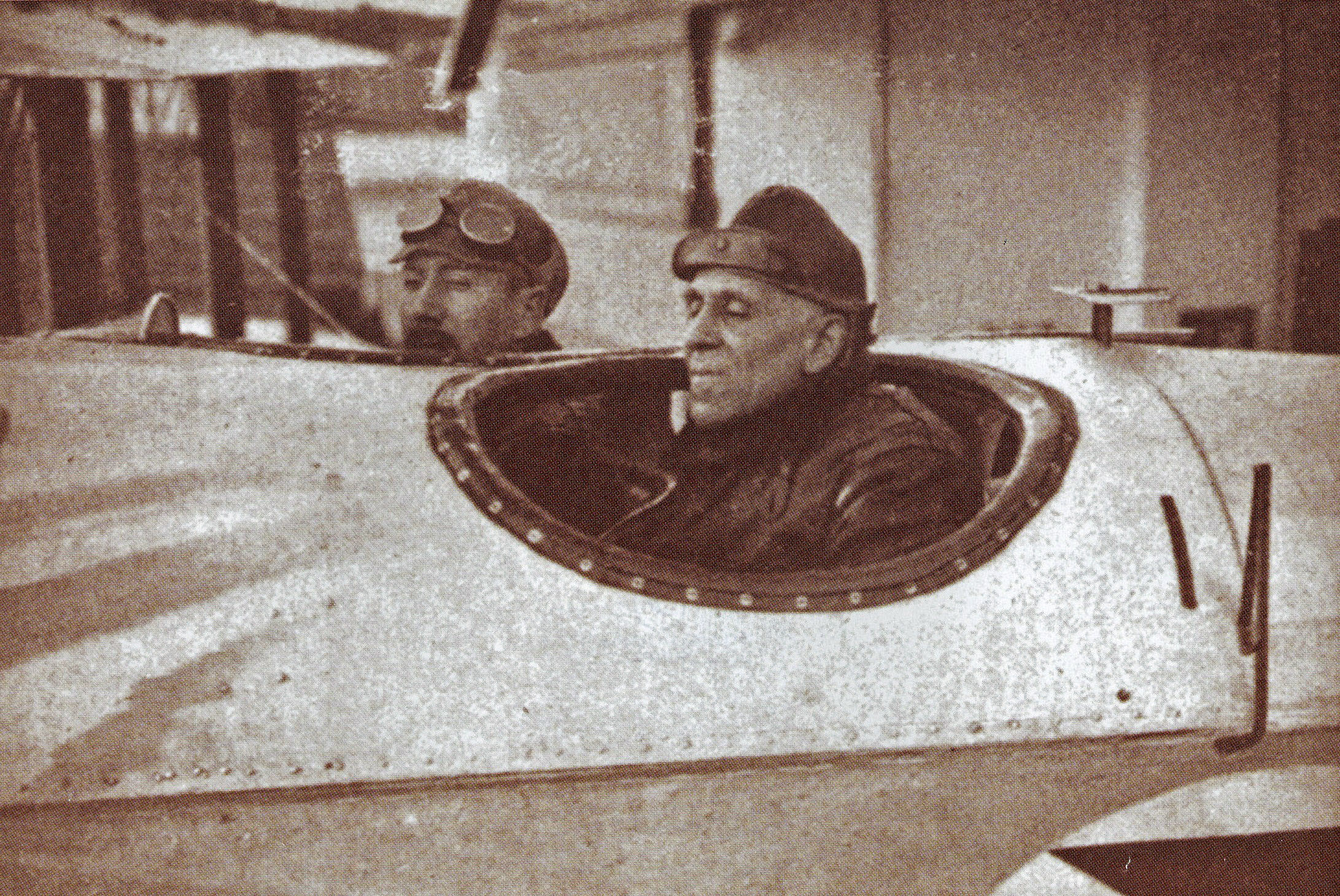
Gago Coutinho (right) and Sacadura Cabral (left) on board the Lusitânia.

The Fairey IIIB seaplane named Lusitânia used by Gago Coutinho and Sacadura Cabral for their transatlantic flight did not have enough fuel capacity to make the entire trip unaided so various stops were made along the way and the aviators were shadowed by a support ship, República. On the journey down the Brazilian coast a heavy rain storm caused the aircraft's engine to fail and the aviators were forced to ditch in the ocean. Realizing that something was wrong, the República sent out a distress signal asking other ships in the area to look out for the seaplane. After some time in the water, the aviators were found by a British freighter. The Paris City of the Reardon Smith Line, under Captain A.E. Tamlyn, en route from Cardiff to Rio, rescued Coutinho and Cabral; they completed their journey with a new aircraft. A commemorative painting of the rescue was made by the Portuguese painter and cartoonist Stuart Carvalhais.

== Inventions ==
Gago Coutinho invented a type of sextant incorporating two spirit levels to provide an artificial horizon. This adaptation of the traditional marine sextant allowed navigation without visual reference to the real horizon. He also invented an optical flight instrument, to be mounted on the plane's cockpit floor, which measures leeway in flight whenever ground remains visible.

== Historical work ==
He dedicated himself to the nautical history of the Portuguese Discoveries after 1924. His vast body of work later would be published in A Náutica dos Descobrimentos (The Nautical of the Discoveries) (1951–1952), in two volumes.

== Criticism of relativity ==
Gago Coutinho was a critic of Albert Einstein's theory of relativity and authored articles and books against it. His arguments were well publicized, causing mathematician Ruy Luís Gomes to defend relativity against his criticisms.

== Gallery ==
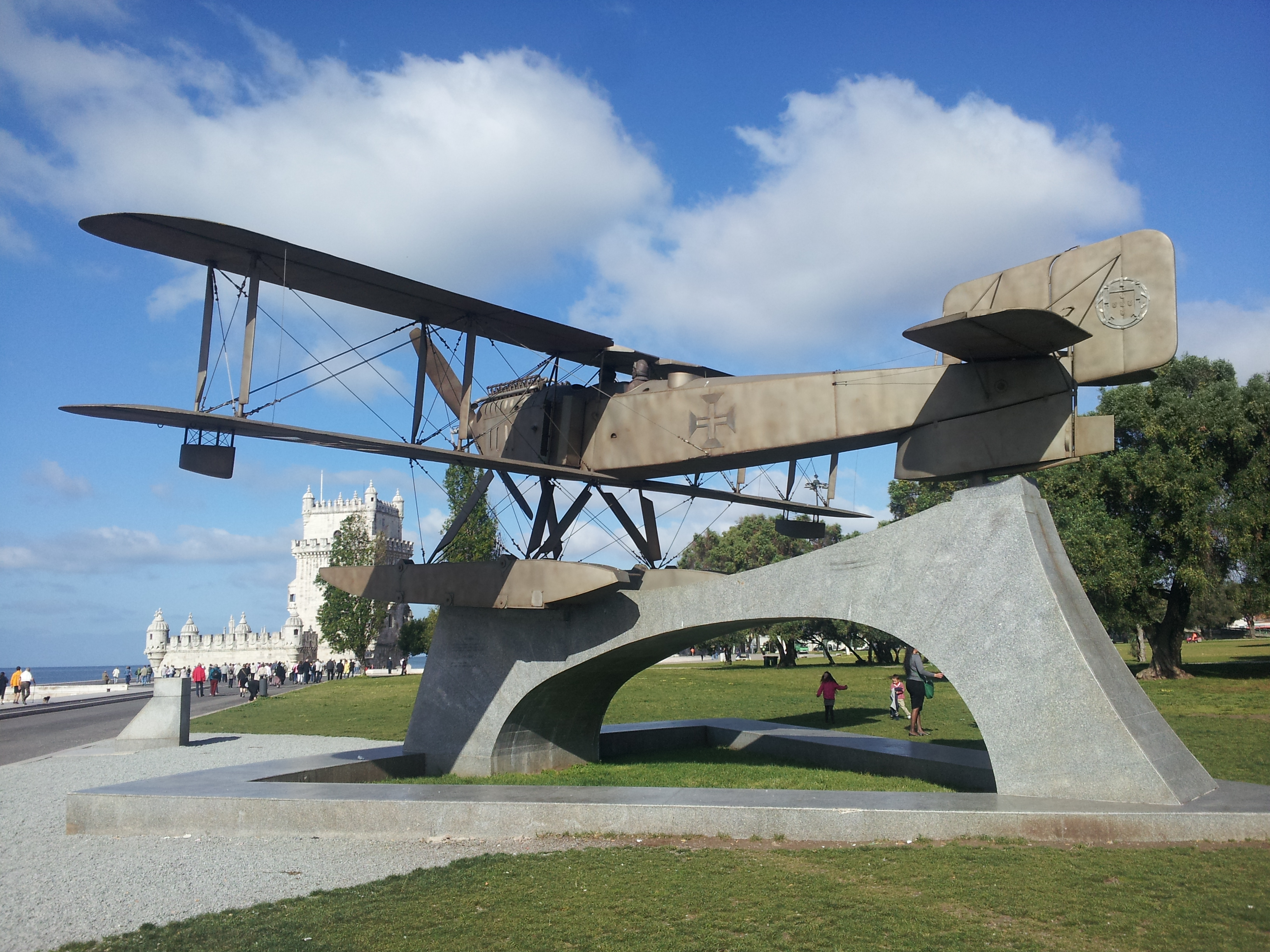
Lisbon monument to the flight

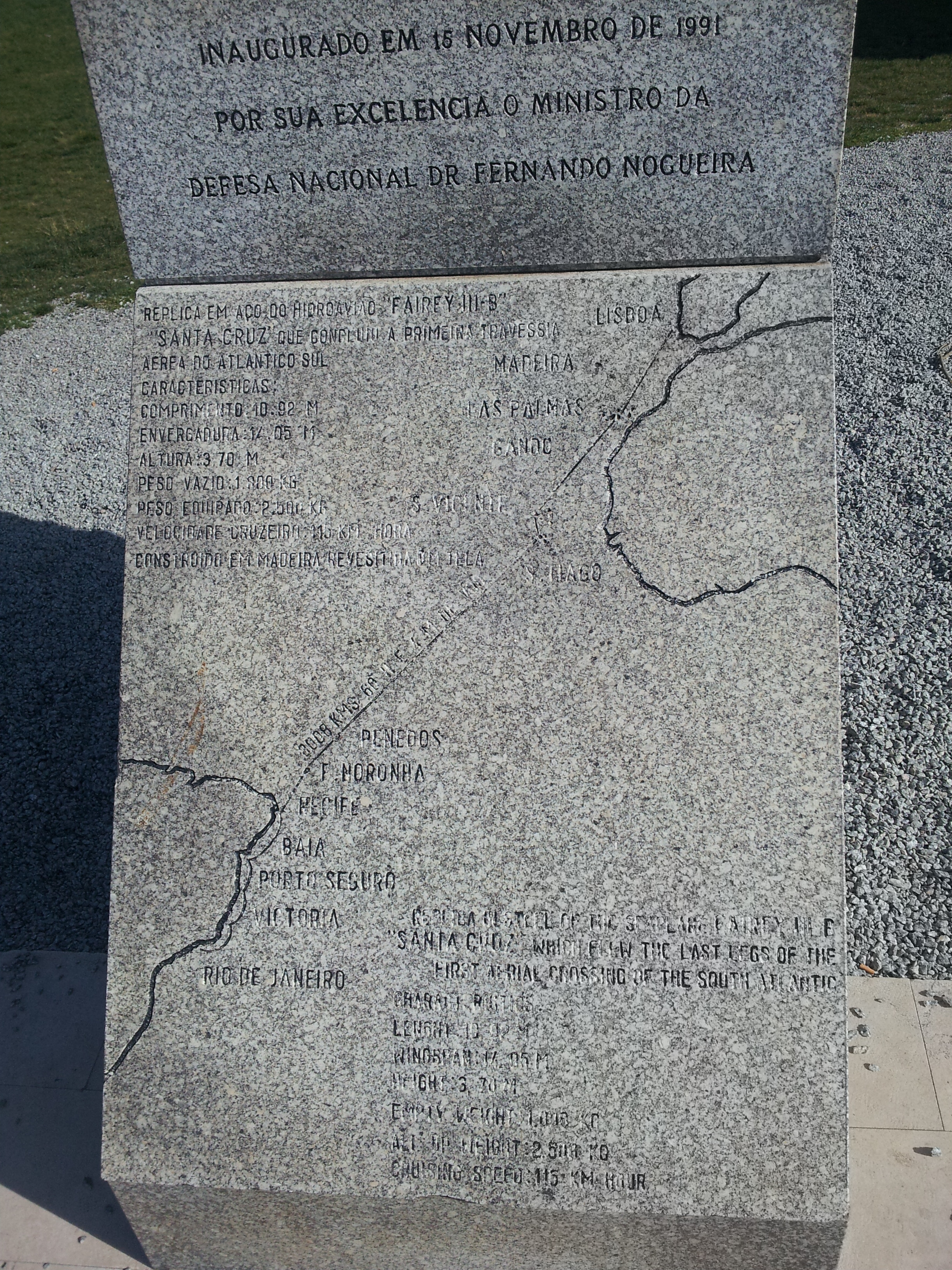
Lisbon monument of the route

Route of the first to cross the South Atlantic Ocean by air

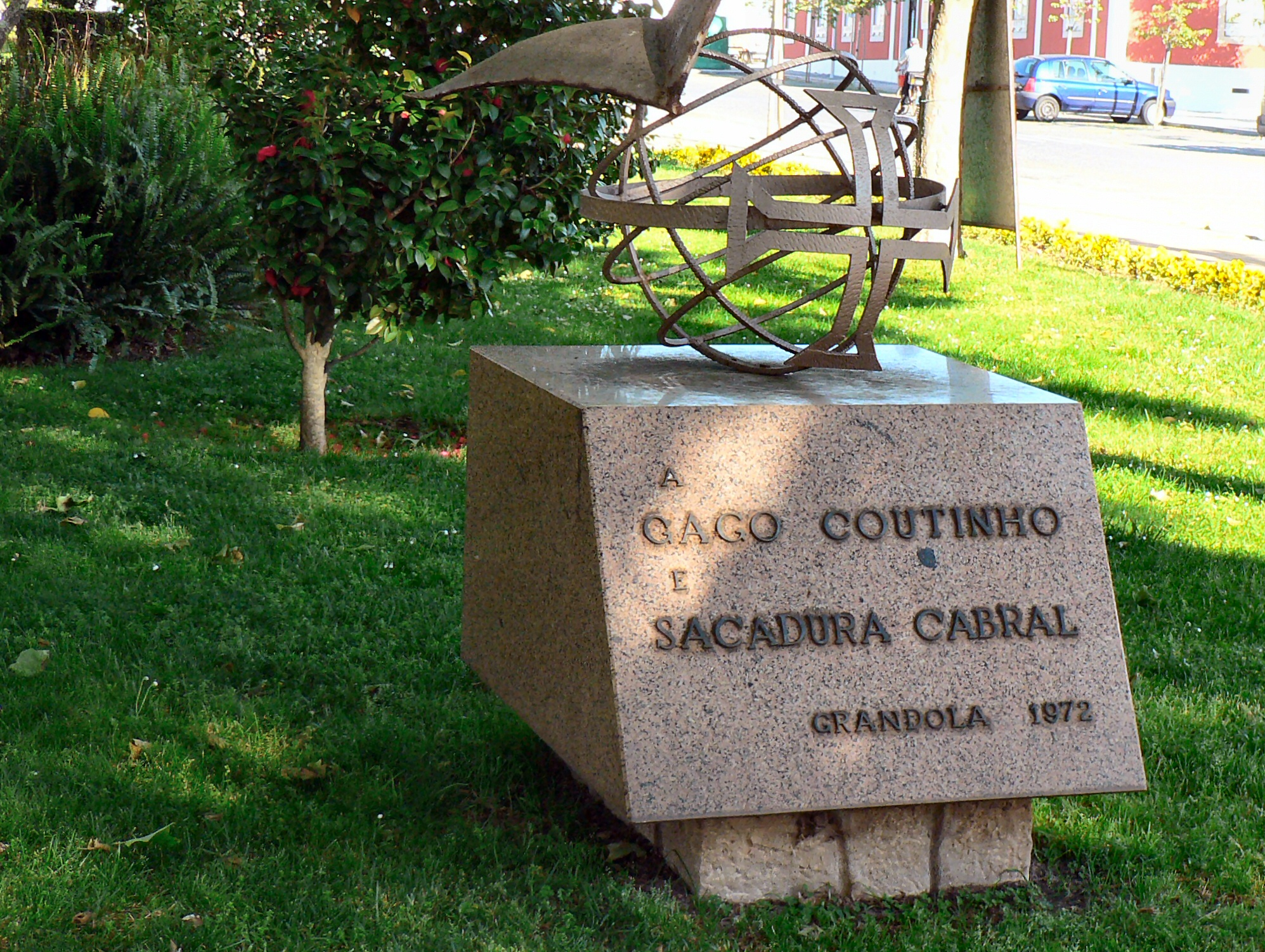
Monument to Sacadura Cabral and Gago Coutinho in Grândola (Portugal)

== Bibliography ==
- Pinto, Rui Miguel da Costa, "Gago Coutinho simples aventureiro ou um homem de Ciência", in Filatelia Lusitana, série III, nº19, Lisboa, Federação Portuguesa de Filatelia, 2009.
- Pinto, Rui Miguel da Costa, Gago Coutinho e as relações luso brasileiras, Espírito Santo (Brasil), Instituto Histórico e Geográfico do Espírito Santo, 2009.
