= Ship's cat =

Cat that lives aboard a ship at sea

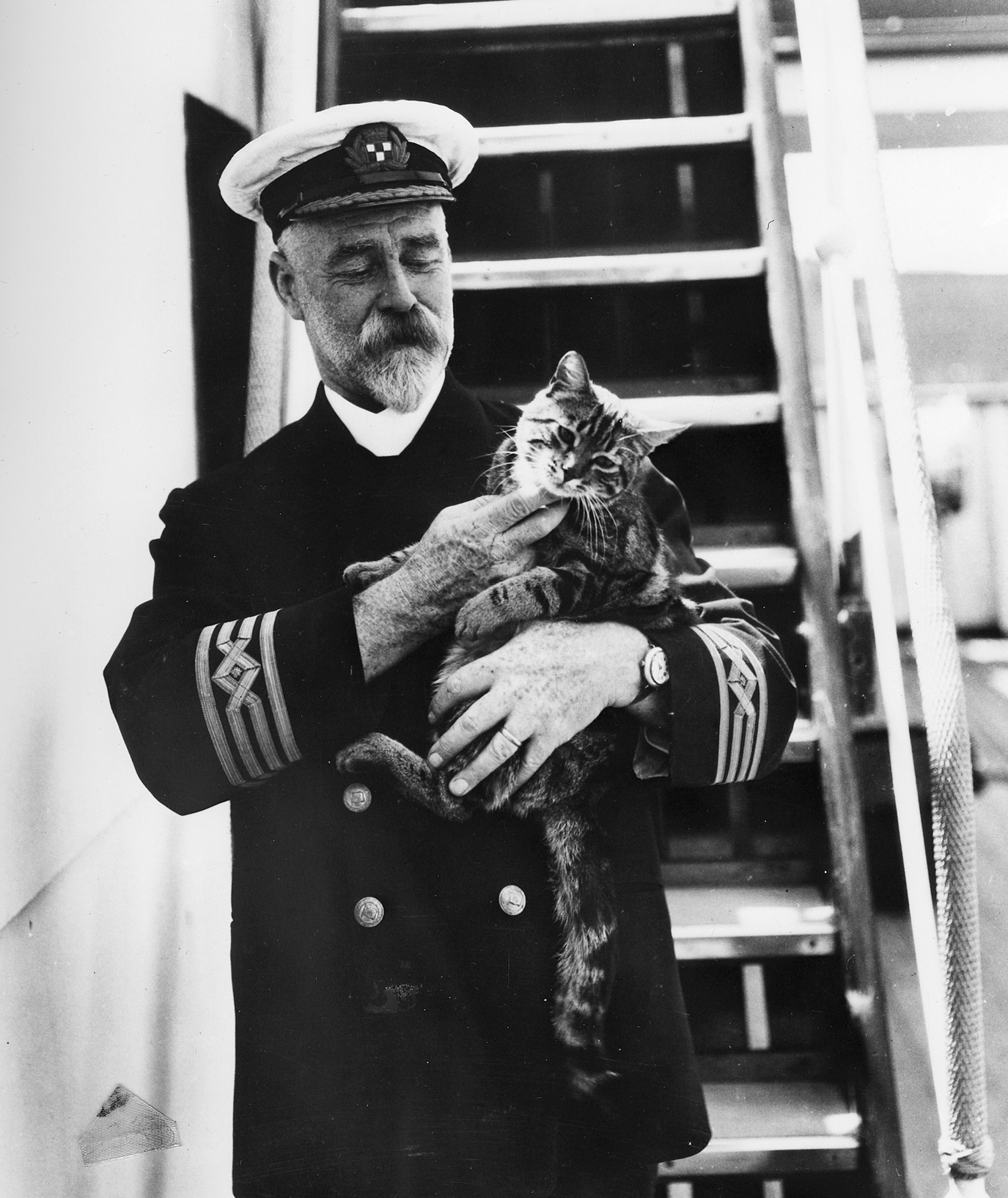
Captain AJ Hailey on RMS Empress of Canada with the ship's cat, c. 1920s

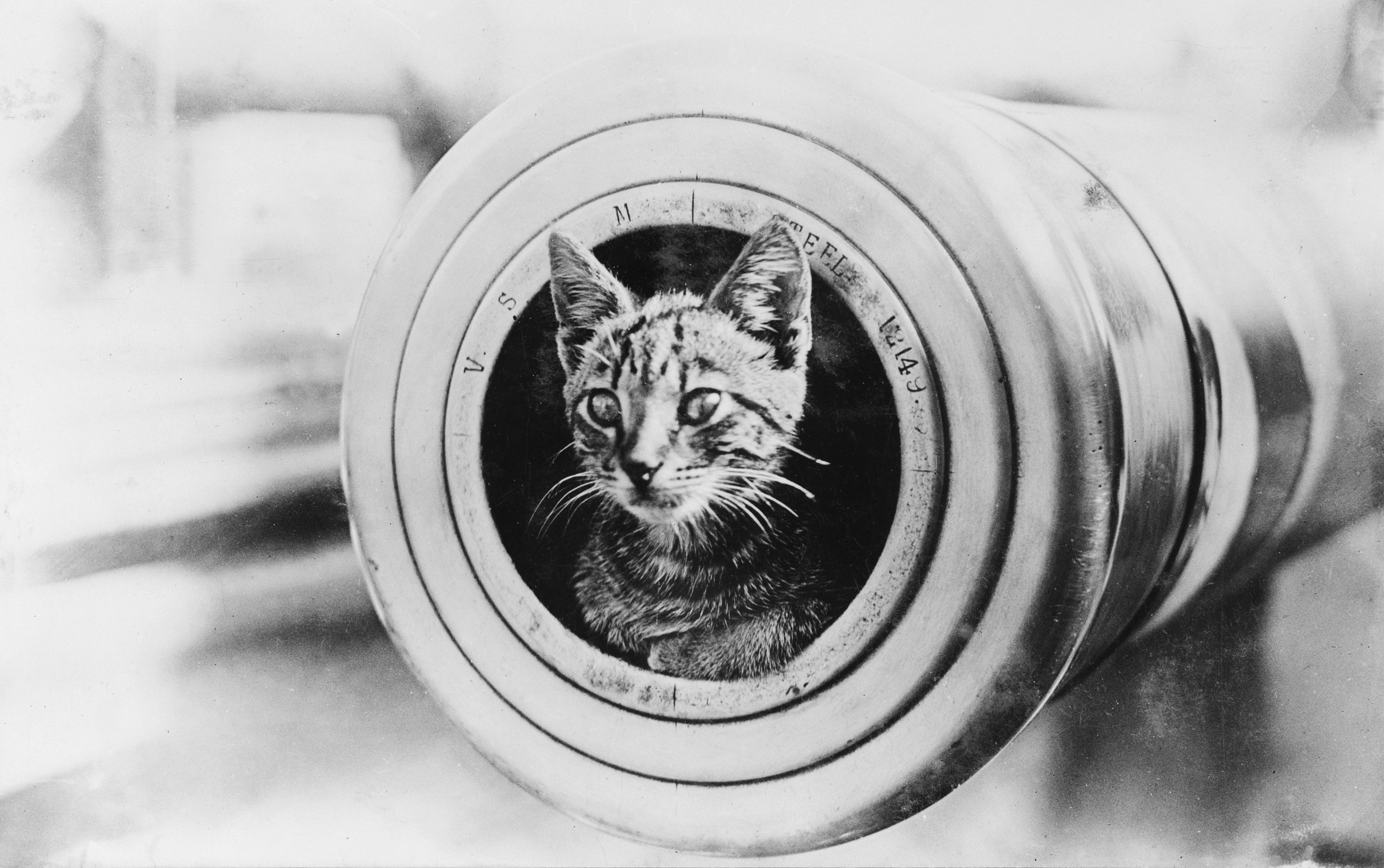
Ship's cat on HMAS Encounter during World War I

The ship's cat has been a common feature on many trading, exploration, and naval ships dating to ancient times. Cats have been brought on ships for many reasons, most importantly to control rodents. Vermin aboard a ship can cause damage to ropes, woodwork, and more recently, electrical wiring. In addition, rodents threaten ships' stores, devour crews' foodstuff, and can cause economic damage to ships' cargo, such as grain. Vermin are also a source of disease, which is dangerous for ships that are at sea for long periods of time. Rat fleas are carriers of plague, and rats on ships were believed (Note: A 2018 study suggests this might not be true.) to be a primary vector of the Black Death.

In addition to their role as pest control, cats acted as companions to the sailors and as mascots for the ships.

== History ==
The African wildcat was probably first tamed in the Fertile Crescent during the first agricultural revolution that started about 10,000 years ago. Small cat bones excavated on Mediterranean islands indicate that cats were introduced around the beginning of the first millennium. Analysis of mitochondrial DNA of archaeological cat specimens revealed that ancient Egyptian cats started spreading in the 8th century BCE along Mediterranean trading routes and had reached a Viking port at the Baltic Sea by the 7th century CE. The study suggests that Viking sailors took cats with them on their voyages. During the Age of Discovery from the 15th through the 18th centuries, explorers and traders took them on board their ships to much of the rest of the world.

The Royal Navy banned cats and other pet animals from all ships on the ocean in 1975 on hygiene grounds. However, cats are still common on many private ships. One notable example is "Toolbox" (a feral kitten born in a toolbox), the senior ship's cat, official warrant officer and "Captain's Assistant" aboard the modern Kalmar Nyckel. A celebrity in her own right, she is the subject of two books.

== Cats and superstition ==
Sometimes worshipped as deities, cats have long had a reputation as magical animals and numerous myths and superstitions sprang up among the unusually superstitious seafaring community. They were considered to be intelligent and lucky animals, and a high level of care was devoted to keeping them happy. Some sailors believed that polydactyl cats were better at catching pests, possibly connected with the suggestion that extra digits give a polydactyl cat better balance, important when at sea. In some places polydactyl cats became known as "ship's cats".

Cats were believed to have miraculous powers that could protect ships from dangerous weather. Sometimes, fishermen's wives would keep black cats at home too, in the hope that they would be able to use their influence to protect their husbands at sea. It was believed to be lucky if a cat approached a sailor on deck, but unlucky if it only came halfway, and then retreated. Another popular belief was that cats could start storms through magic stored in their tails. If a ship's cat fell or was thrown overboard, it was thought that it would summon a terrible storm to sink the ship and that if the ship was able to survive, it would be cursed with nine years of bad luck. Other beliefs included that if a cat licked its fur against the grain, it meant a hail storm was coming; if it sneezed it meant rain; and if it was frisky it meant wind.

Some of these beliefs are rooted in reality. Cats are able to detect slight changes in the weather, as a result of their very sensitive inner ears, which also allow them to land upright when falling. Low atmospheric pressure, a common precursor of stormy weather, often makes cats nervous and restless. Cats naturally react to barometric pressure changes, through which a keen observer can detect unusual behavior and predict an incoming storm.

== Notable ship's cats ==
The prevalence of cats on ships has led to them being reported on by a number of noted seafarers. The outbreak of the Second World War, with the spread of mass communication and the active nature of the world's navies, also led to a number of ship's cats becoming celebrities in their own right.

=== Aussie ===
Aussie was the last ship's cat of the transpacific liner RMS Niagara. He was a five-year-old grey-and-white long-haired tom. His mother had been Niagara's cat before him; his father was a Persian cat in Vancouver, British Columbia. Aussie was born at Suva in Fiji.

When Niagara was mined off the coast of New Zealand in 1940, Aussie was put in one of the lifeboats, but he jumped back aboard ship. A few days later, residents of Horahora, Whangarei, claimed that a cat answering Aussie's description came ashore on a piece of driftwood, and that one of them had taken him in, but the cat escaped and had not been seen since.

=== Blackie ===
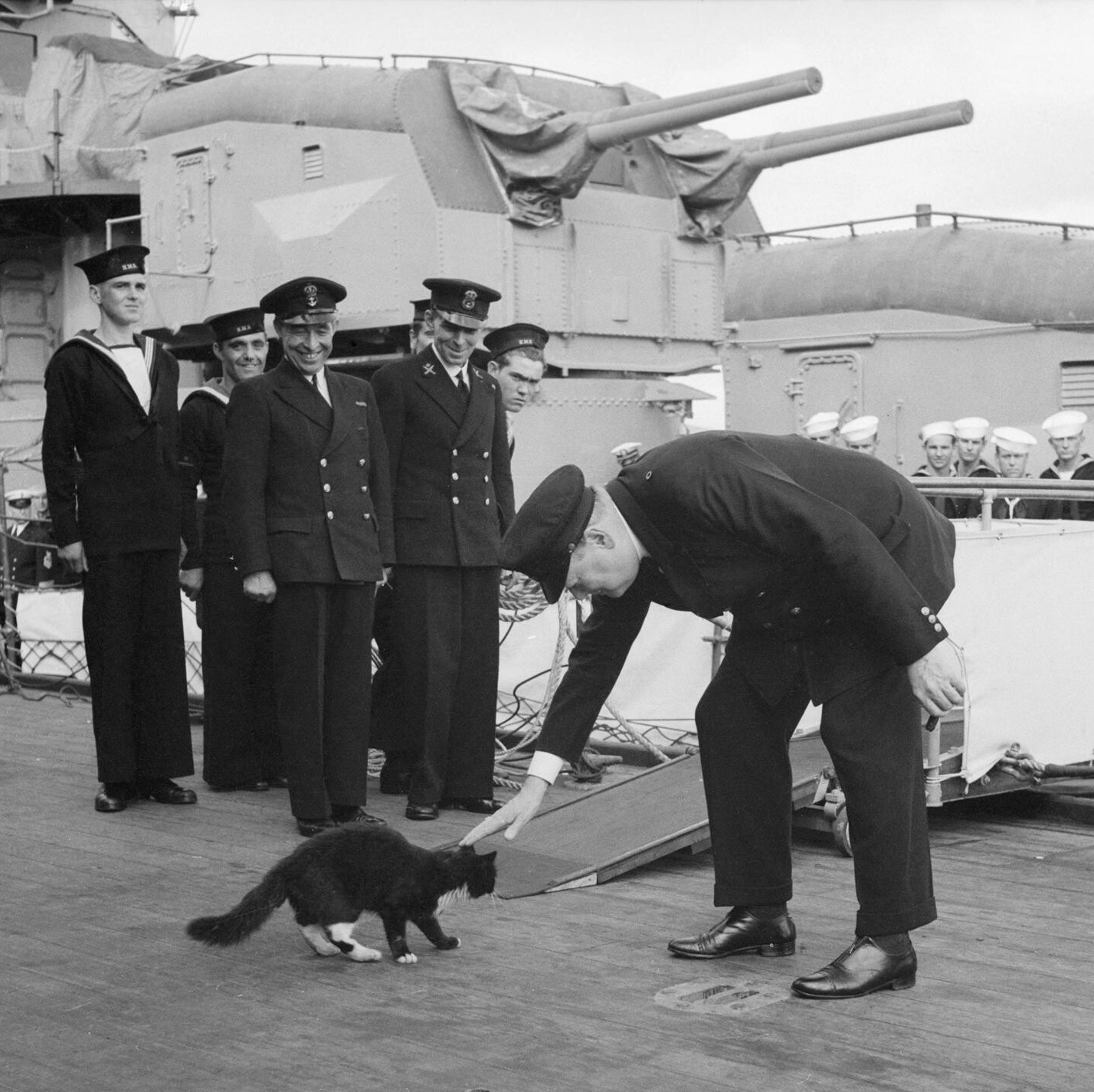
Winston Churchill pets Blackie, the ship's cat of HMS Prince of Wales, from boarding USS McDougal during a 1941 ceremonial visit

Blackie was HMS Prince of Wales's ship's cat. During the Second World War, he achieved worldwide fame after Prince of Wales carried Prime Minister Winston Churchill across the Atlantic to NS Argentia, Newfoundland, in August 1941. There he secretly met with the United States President Franklin D. Roosevelt for several days in a secure anchorage resulting in the declaration of the Atlantic Charter.

As Churchill prepared to step off Prince of Wales, Blackie approached. Churchill stooped to bid farewell to Blackie, and the moment was photographed and reported in the world media. In honour of the success of the visit, Blackie was renamed Churchill.

Blackie survived the sinking of Prince of Wales by the Imperial Japanese Navy Air Service later that year, and was taken to Singapore with the survivors. He could not be found when Singapore was evacuated the following year and his fate is unknown.

=== Camouflage ===
Camouflage was the name of the ship's cat aboard a US Coast Guard LST in the Pacific theater, WWII. He was known for chasing enemy tracer rounds across the deck.

=== Chibley ===
Chibley was the ship's cat aboard the tall ship barque Picton Castle. She was rescued from an animal shelter and circumnavigated the world five times. Picton Castle's role as a training ship resulted in Chibley being introduced to a large number of visitors and becoming a celebrity in her own right. Chibley died on November 10, 2011, in Lunenburg, Nova Scotia. She had sailed over 180,000 miles at sea.

=== Convoy ===
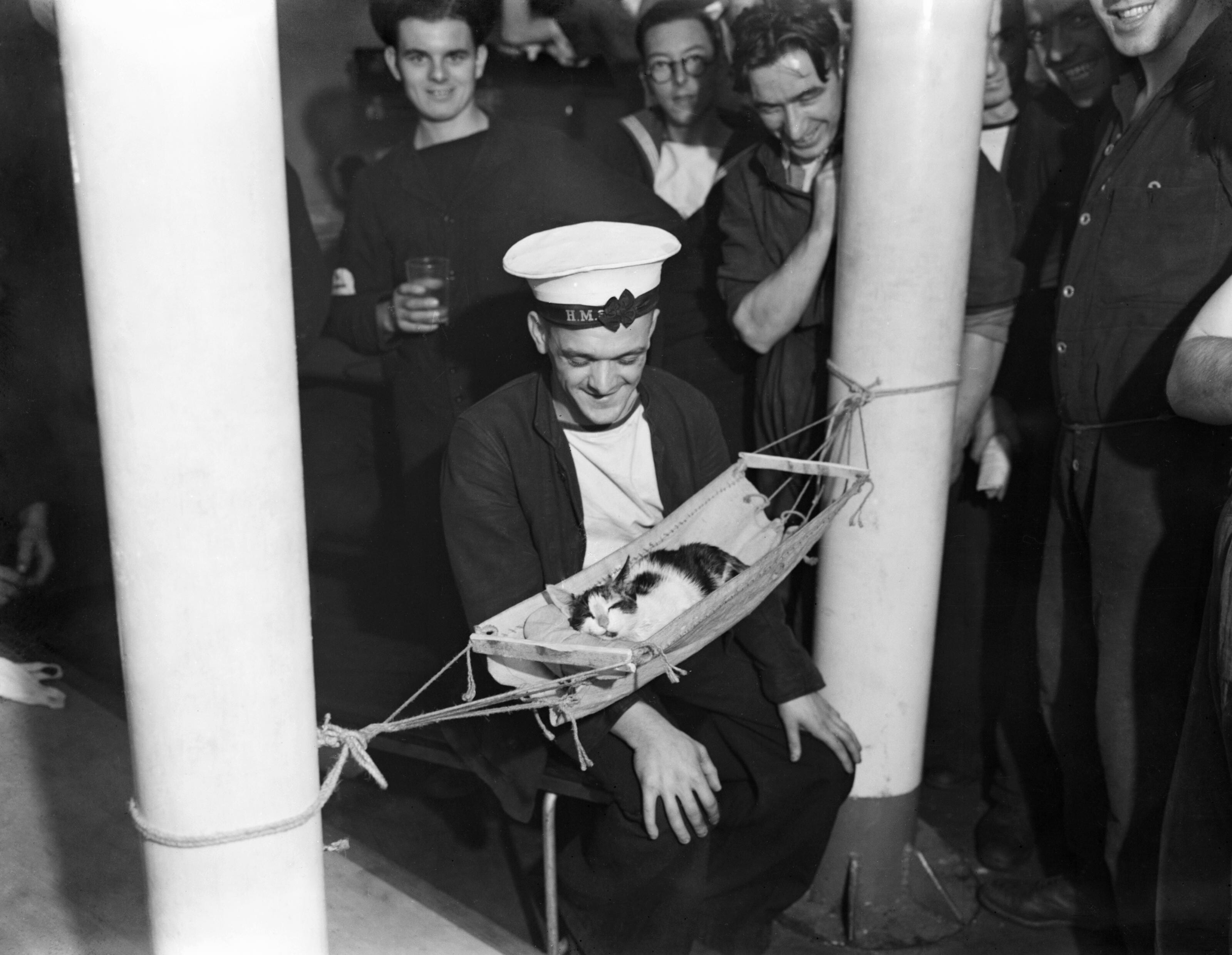
Convoy asleep in a hammock aboard HMS Hermione

Convoy was the ship's cat aboard HMS Hermione. He was named for his role in convoy escort missions. He was listed in the ship's roster and had a special kit, including a tiny hammock. He was killed along with 87 crew members when Hermione was torpedoed and sunk by the German submarine U-205 on June 16, 1942.

=== Emmy ===
Emmy was the ship's cat on RMS Empress of Ireland. She was an orange tabby cat who never missed a voyage. However, on 28 May 1914, Emmy jumped ship while in port in Quebec City. The crew returned her to the ship, but she left again, leaving her kittens behind. Empress of Ireland left without her, which was regarded as a terrible omen. Early the next morning Empress of Ireland was struck by Storstad while steaming through fog near the mouth of the Saint Lawrence River and rapidly sank, killing more than 1,000 people.

=== Felix ===
Felix was the ship's cat aboard Mayflower II when she set sail from Devon, England, to Plymouth, Massachusetts, in 1957 to symbolise the solidarity between the UK and the US following World War II. He was given his own life jacket and once suffered a broken paw after a mishap. The paw was set by the ship's doctor. Photos and stories about Felix appeared in National Geographic, Life, and Yankee magazine after his arrival in the US. The cat and the rest of the crew marched in a New York ticker tape parade and toured the East Coast that summer. He was eventually adopted by the cabin boy's girlfriend, Ann Berry, and settled in Waltham, Massachusetts. A former captain of the Mayflower II wrote a children's book about Felix entitled Felix and his Mayflower II Adventures. The book was published during the celebration of the ship's fiftieth anniversary at Plimoth Plantation.

=== Halifax ===
Halifax was the name given to Alvah and Diana Simon's ship's cat who was found in the Canadian port of Halifax, on their way to winter at Tay Bay in 1994, on Roger Henry. The cat spent all of the time iced in on the boat with Alvah, when Diana had to leave for family purposes. Alvah's book North To The Night describes his adventure in the ice with Halifax the cat, who ended up losing half an ear to frostbite.

=== Jenny ===
Jenny was the name of the ship's cat aboard Titanic and was mentioned in the accounts of several of the crew members who survived the ocean liner's fateful 1912 maiden voyage. She was transferred from Titanic's sister ship Olympic and gave birth in the week before Titanic left Southampton. The galley is where Jenny and her kittens normally lived, cared for by the victualling staff who fed them kitchen scraps. Stewardess Violet Jessop later wrote in her memoir that the cat "laid her family near Jim, the scullion, whose approval she always sought and who always gave her warm devotion".

=== Kiddo ===
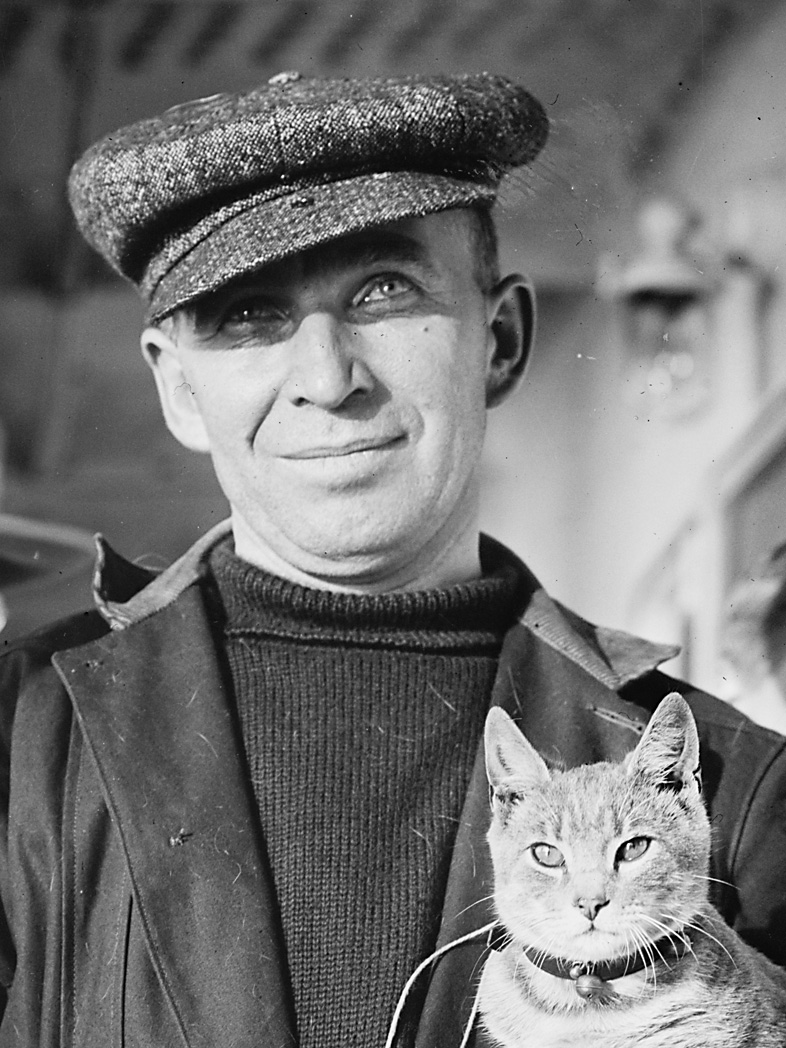
Melvin Vaniman and Kiddo

Kiddo the cat was apparently a stowaway on the airship America, when it departed Atlantic City, New Jersey, in an attempt to cross the Atlantic Ocean in 1910. Initially, Kiddo found the experience of air travel quite unpleasant and raised such a ruckus, the cat had to be placed in a gunny sack and suspended beneath the airship's gondola. He eventually settled in and evidently was better at predicting bad weather than the airship's barometer. America's engines failed and the small crew and Kiddo abandoned the dirigible for lifeboats and they sighted the Royal Mail Ship Trent near Bermuda. After their rescue, Kiddo was retired from being a ship's cat and was cared for by Edith Wellman Ainsworth, the daughter of the American journalist, explorer, and aviator Walter Wellman who made the aborted ocean crossing in the airship.

=== Mrs Chippy ===
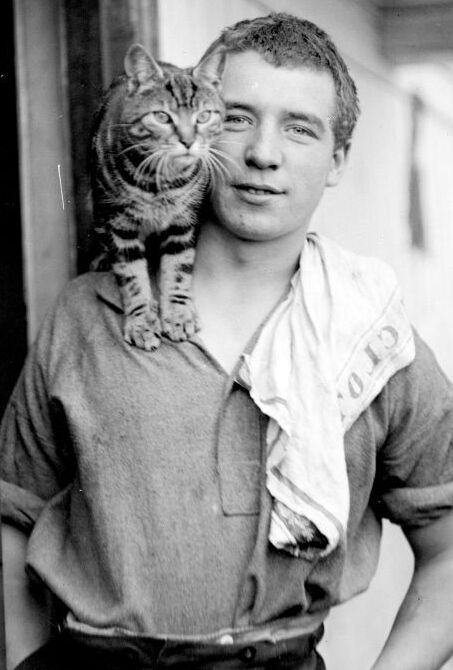
Mrs Chippy in 1914

Mrs Chippy (actually a male) was the ship's cat aboard Endurance, the ship used by Sir Ernest Shackleton for his Imperial Trans-Antarctic Expedition in 1914. Endurance was destroyed in 1915 after becoming trapped in pack ice and sank; Shackleton then ordered four sled dogs and Mrs. Chippy shot, as he had decided that the animals could not be properly cared for during the arduous journey ahead and would likely not survive.

=== Nansen ===
Nansen (actually a female) was the ship's cat on Belgica, which was used for the Belgian Antarctic Expedition in 1897. She was brought on board by cabin boy Johan Koren and was named after Fridtjof Nansen. She died on 22 June 1898, and was buried in the Antarctic.

=== Peebles ===
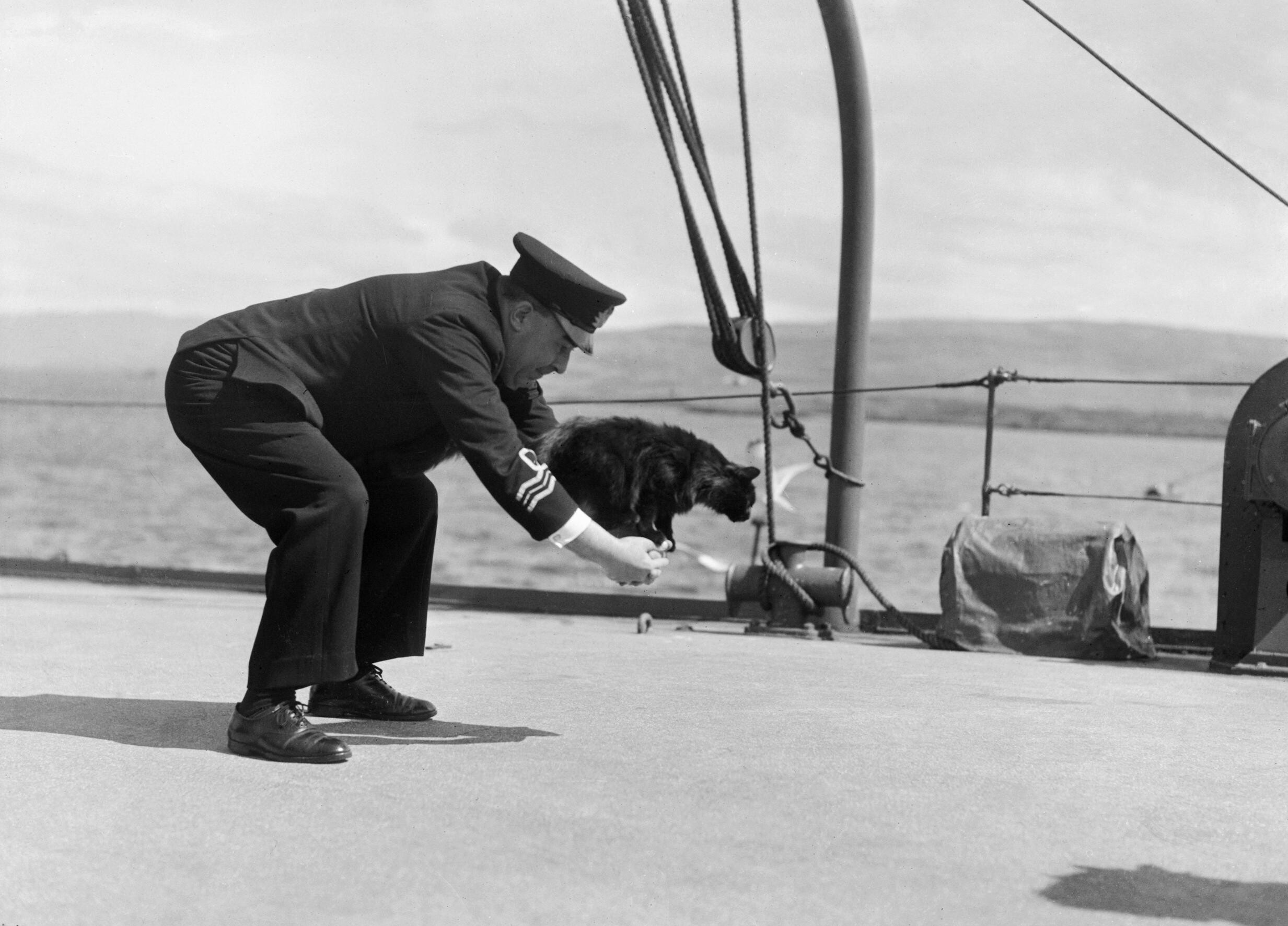
Lieutenant Commander R H Palmer plays with Peebles, the ship's cat, who leaps through his clasped arms on board HMS Western Isles at Tobermory, Mull

Peebles was the ship's cat aboard HMS Western Isles. Another cat who became a favourite of the ship's crew, he was known to be particularly intelligent and would shake the hands of strangers when they entered the wardroom.

=== Pooli ===
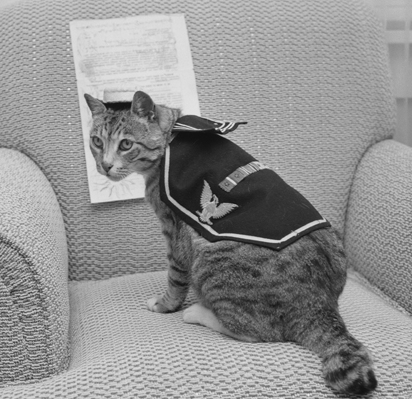
Pooli in uniform on July 4, 1959, her 15th birthday

Pooli served aboard a United States attack transport during the Second World War. She was awarded three service ribbons and four battle stars.

=== Rinda ===
Rinda was the ship's cat on the Norwegian cargo ship Rinda, which was torpedoed and sunk during World War II. When the surviving crew realised that their beloved ship's cat was not on board the lifeboat, they rowed around in the night until they finally heard a pitiful "miauu" in the distance. "We rowed as hard as we could and laughed and cried when we lifted the sopping wet furball aboard". The cat became the ship's cat aboard the rescue ship, the British armed naval trawler HMT Pict, and was given the name Rinda after the previous ship.

=== Simon ===
Simon was the ship's cat of HMS Amethyst during the Yangtze Incident in 1949 and was wounded in the bombardment of the ship which killed 25 of Amethyst's crew, including the commanding officer. He soon recovered and resumed killing rats and keeping up the crew's morale. He was appointed to the rank of 'Able Seacat' Simon and became a celebrity after the ship escaped the Yangtze and returned to Britain. He later contracted an infection and died shortly after. Tributes poured in and his obituary appeared in The Times. He was posthumously awarded the Dickin Medal, the only cat ever to earn the award, and was buried with full naval honours.

=== Tarawa ===
Tarawa was a kitten rescued from a pillbox during the Battle of Tarawa by the United States Coast Guard. She was a mascot aboard an LST but did not get along with the LST's other mascot, a dog named Kodiak, and jumped ship ashore.

=== Tiddles ===
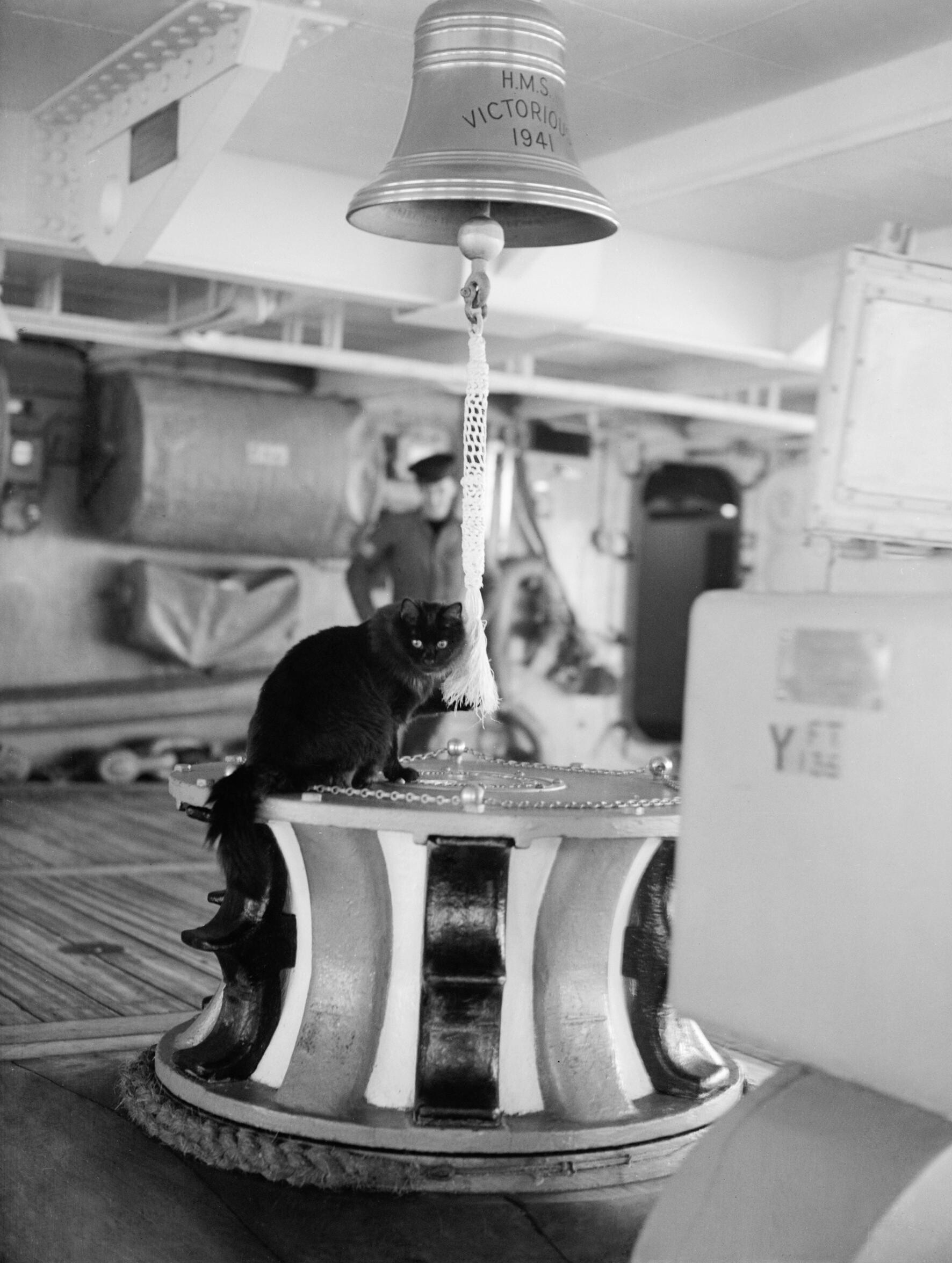
Tiddles at his station aboard HMS Victorious. Despite a long tradition, there are no longer ships' cats aboard Royal Navy vessels

Tiddles was the ship's cat on a number of Royal Navy aircraft carriers. He was born aboard HMS Argus, and later joined HMS Victorious. He was often seen at his favourite station, on the aft capstan, where he would play with the bell-rope. He eventually travelled over 30,000 miles (48,000 km) during his time in service.

=== Togo ===
Togo was the ship's cat on HMS Dreadnought. A Persian cat, Togo was known for resting in the barrels of the ship's main battery.

=== Tom ===
Tom, a grey and black tabby, was a ship's cat of the US Navy, aboard the USS Maine (ACR-1) in 1898. When the ship was sunk in Havana Harbor on 15 February 1898 (an act which precipitated the Spanish–American War), 266 sailors, a Pug mascot, and two of the three ship's cats died, but Tom survived (with injuries). Adopted by the Maine's executive officer, then-Commander Richard Wainwright, Tom was subsequently featured in animal-rights-related materials by the ASPCA and other humane societies, who praised the naval treatment of ship's cats as cared-for, working companion animals.

=== Trim ===
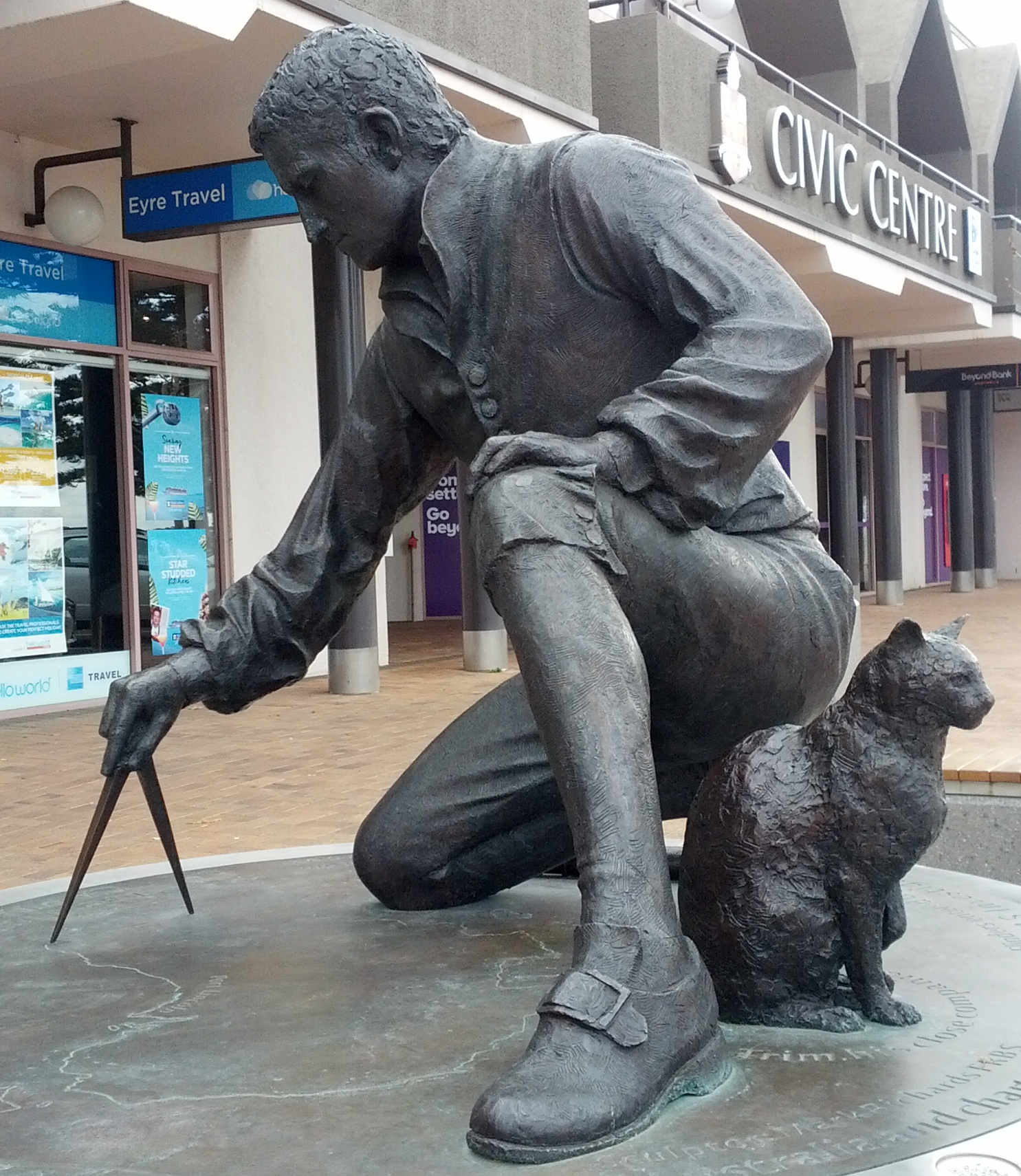
Trim, Matthew Flinders boat cat. Port Lincoln, South Australia

Trim was the ship's cat on a number of the ships under the command of Matthew Flinders during voyages to circumnavigate and map the coastline of Australia during 1801–1803. He became a favourite of the crew and was the first cat to circumnavigate Australia. He remained with Flinders until death. He has been the subject of a number of works of literature, and statues have been placed in his honour, including one that sits on a windowsill at the State Library of New South Wales in Sydney.

=== Unsinkable Sam ===
Previously named Oscar, he was the ship's cat of the German battleship Bismarck. When the ship was sunk on 27 May 1941, only 116 crew members of over 2,200 survived. Oscar was picked up by the destroyer HMS Cossack, one of the ships responsible for destroying the Bismarck. Cossack herself was torpedoed and sunk on 24 October 1941, killing 159 of her crew; but Oscar again survived, was rescued and taken to Gibraltar. He became the ship's cat of HMS Ark Royal, which was torpedoed and sunk in November that year. Oscar was again rescued, but it was decided at that time to transfer him to a home on land. By now known as Unsinkable Sam because of surviving the three ship sinkings, he was given a new job as shore duty mouse-catcher in the office buildings of the Governor of Gibraltar because he still had "six lives to go". He eventually was taken to the UK and spent the rest of his life at the 'Home for Sailors'. A portrait of him exists in the collections of the National Maritime Museum in Greenwich.

== In fiction ==
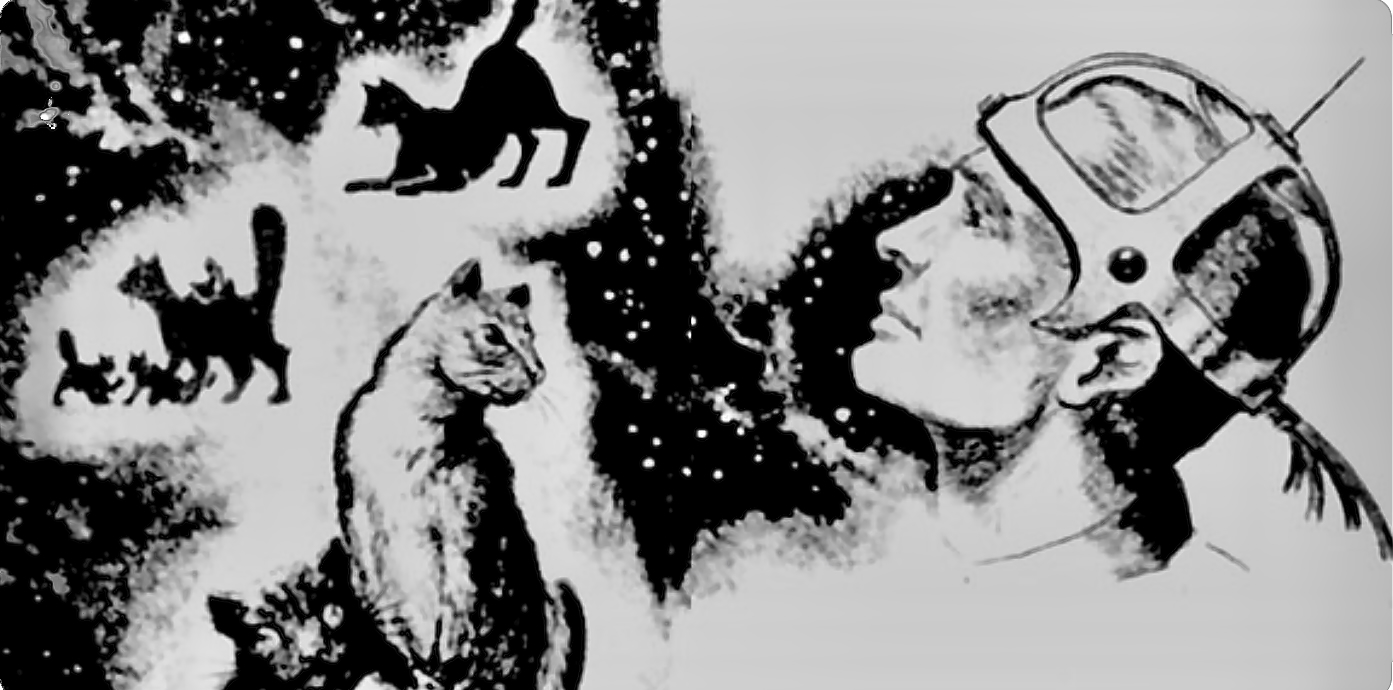
Illustration for "The Game of Rat and Dragon" from Galaxy Science Fiction, October 1955

There are at least two books called The Ship's Cat: a 1977 children's book by Richard Adams and Alan Aldridge, and a 2000 novel by Jock Brandis. Matthew Flinders' Cat is a 2002 novel by Bryce Courtenay featuring tales about Trim, the ship's cat that circumnavigated Australia. In Fish Head, a 1954 children's book by Jean Fritz, the eponymous cat unwittingly becomes a ship's cat.

In science fiction, the role of the ship's cat has been transferred to spaceships. Notable examples include Cordwainer Smith's 1955 short story "The Game of Rat and Dragon" and Andre Norton's 1968 novel The Zero Stone featuring a telepathic mutant feline named Eet. Robert A. Heinlein's The Cat Who Walks Through Walls features a cat named Pixel who travels on various space adventures with the narrator. On film, Alien (1979) and the sequel Aliens (1986) feature Jones ("Jonesy") aboard USCSS Nostromo. In the UK science fiction comedy series Red Dwarf, a man called Lister was in stasis for three million years on the spaceship Red Dwarf when all other living beings had died except his pregnant cat. The cats evolved over the three million years into a humanoid species and when Lister came out of stasis, he met the last of them that was called Cat. On Star Trek: The Next Generation, Data, second officer of the USS Enterprise (NCC-1701-D), owned a cat named Spot who he unsuccessfully attempted to train. Spot was portrayed by six different feline actors during seven seasons of the show.

== See also ==
- List of individual cats
