= Kodak Panoram =

Late 19th century panoramic roll-film camera

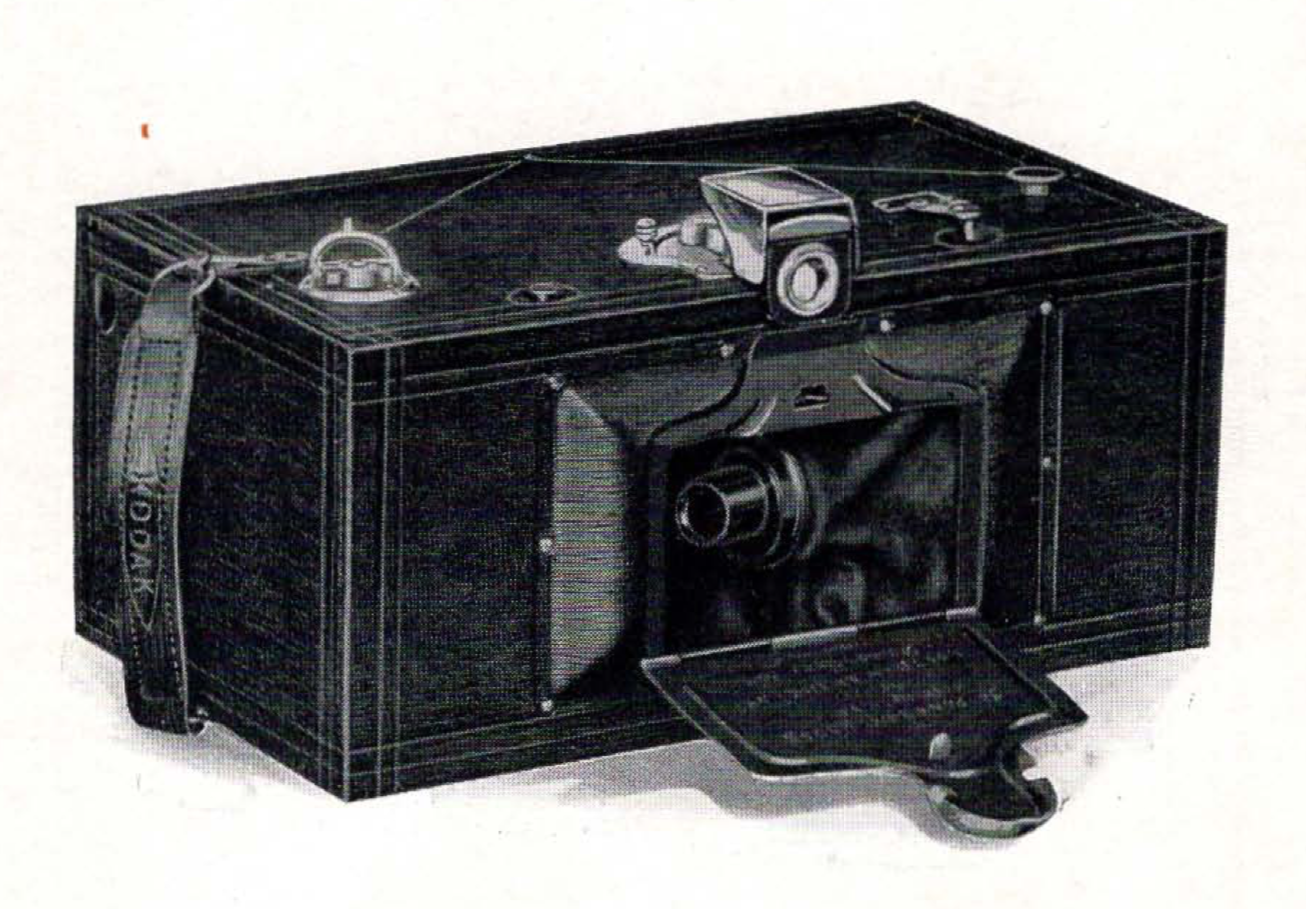
No.3A Panoram Kodak

The Kodak Panoram camera was a roll-film swing-lens panoramic camera made in Rochester, New York, USA by Eastman Kodak between 1899 and 1928.

== Background ==
While panoramic cameras had been developed as early as Friedrich Martens' construction of his Megaskop-Kamera in 1845, they became broadly accessible only in the 1890s, a major obstacle was the use of flat glass plates being incompatible with the design of such cameras (though Martens devised curved Daguerreotype plates in his camera with a rotating lens, their display is made difficult by their shape).

This technical impasse was resolved with the invention of roll film in the 1880s. Eder notes that "It was not until the invention of the flexible silver bromide films that [the panoramic camera] achieved the great success which it merits. The prototype of the Kodak Panoram camera, introduced with commercial success in 1900, is easily seen at first sight. The Kodak Panoram camera permits an instantaneous exposure over an extensive field of vision by an analogous turning of the lens and by a slit shutter passing in front of the film."

It was first shown at the Exposition in Paris, 1900. In the year prior to the invention of Kodak's camera, the first mass-produced American panoramic camera, the Al-Vista, was introduced in 1898. In 1907, the German Ernemann company developed a "panorama-in-the-round camera" (Panorama-Rundkamera) with a 360-degree viewing angle.

== Design ==
The design of the Panorama was patented by Kodak Brownie designer Frank A. Brownell and released as a series of models. It was about the size of a shoe-box and could be hand-held for shooting landscapes, and Kodak described it as "a camera of few parts. Its operation is very simple and good pictures will be obtained from the beginning."

The Panorama No.1 had a swinging Goerz Dagor lens housed in a light-proof leather tube which projected the image progressively during its scan onto flexible 120 films, held against a back plate curved to match the trajectory of the lens. Focus was fixed and the camera intended to render objects sharp only if over 7m (20 feet) into the scene. The swinging mechanism through which the image was transmitted by a rear slit, and with the lens tube not pointing at the film at either end of its travel; were mechanisms that constituted the shutter, which had two settings; "fast" and "slow", the latter being used for most situations except for "views at the seashore, on the water, and for very distant views when the sunlight is unusually bright."

A fold-down door covered the lens when not in use, except on Model 4. The framing was achieved using a brilliant finder mounted centrally on the top-front edge - some with a cover providing a mirror for eye-level use, supplemented by V-shaped sighting lines across the top of the camera. A spirit level at the viewfinder aligned the shot with the horizon line. The No.1 captured 120º field of view, and produced negatives 5.71 cm H x 17.78 cm W . Model 3A used the 6-exposure 122-sizedfilm roll for 3 shots and the 10-exposure roll for 5. The No.4 encompassed 142º on size 103 negatives, each frame being 8.89 cm H x 30.48 cm W.

== Pricing ==
At the turn of the century Fred E. Munsey & Co in Los Angeles was advertising Panoram models at US$8 and US$26 for No.1 and No.4 Panoram models respectively (equivalent to about $252.26 and $819.86 in 2021); little more expensive than the Folding Pocket Kodaks. In the United Kingdom in 1913 "Universal Providers" William Whitely Ltd., of Queens Rd in London offered the No.1 model at £2 10 0, and the No.4 £3 10 0 (£297.40 in 2020) and described the camera;

Takes marvelously realistic pictures of broad stretches of landscape and seascape, open spaces in cities, squares. etc. Large groups of people, reviews, regattas, etc.. are all most vividly recorded by the Panoram Kodak. When held vertically, most artistic panel pictures are obtainable, such as waterfalls, and mountains. etc. Simplicity itself. Loaded and Unloaded in Daylight.

== Users ==
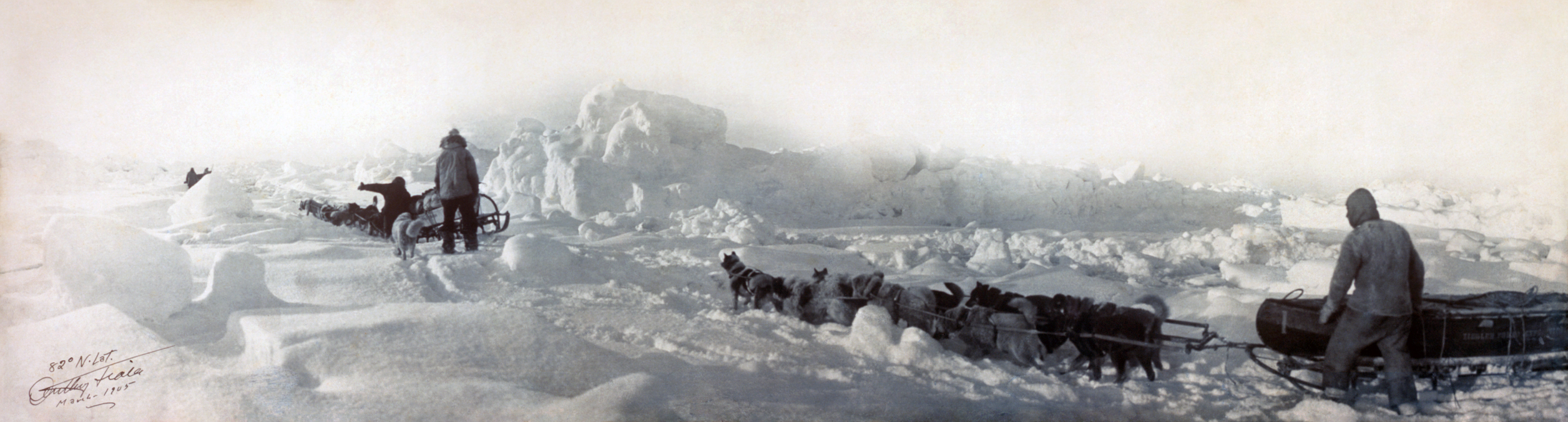
Anthony Fiala (March 1905) 82 N. Latitude, panorama shot during the unsuccessful Ziegler polar expedition of 1903-1905

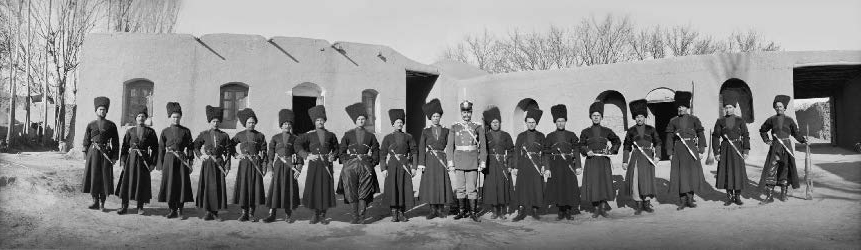
Alexander Iyas (c.1901–1911) Iyas and his Cossack Escort, Turbat-i Haydari, photographed with Kodak Panoram camera

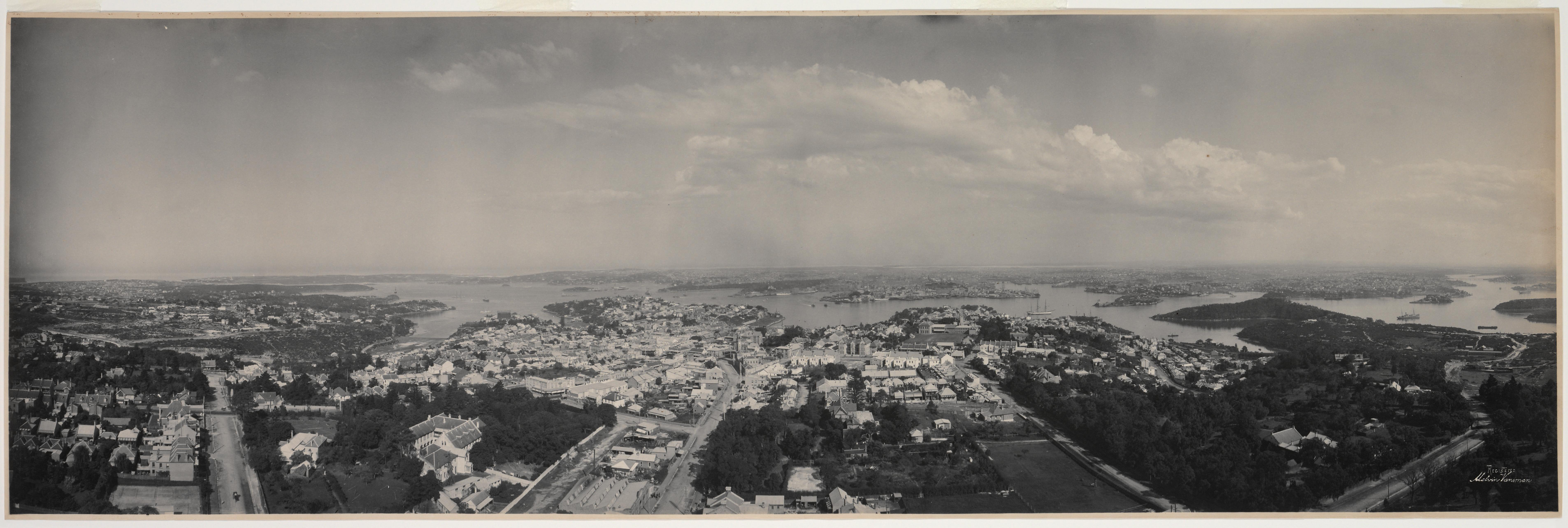
Melvin Vaniman (1904) Panorama of Sydney from a balloon

Being portable and simple in operation, with the added advantage of storing a number of panoramas on a film roll, the Panoram was quickly taken up by innovative photographers for both recording and artistic purposes.

Charles J. Kleingrothe's turn-of-the-century photographs of Sumatran Dutch East Indies were made with the Panoram, and are considered key visual records of colonial Peninsular Malaya, especially of its tin-mining and rubber industries. Anthony Fiala (1869-1950) depicted the 1901 Baldwin Ziegler Expedition and Ziegler Polar Expedition of 1903-5 efforts to be the first to reach the North Pole; his images are taken with large format still cameras and the then new Kodak No. 1 Panoram camera.

The Finn, Alexander Ivanovitch Iyas, the Tsar's consul in Persia 1901–1914, photographed the region, and on 26 February 1904 used the Panoram to photograph the arrival of the Carnegie Institute Expedition to Eastern Persia. He was shot and beheaded in an attack by Turkish troops on 29 December 1914 and by coincidence, at the battle of Sufyan, on a fallen Turkish officer were found Iyas's negatives, which were sent to Iyas's mother. In 1915 Vladimir Minorsky organised a small exhibition of his photographs at the Ministry of Foreign Affairs in St Petersburg. His work remained forgotten for a century.

The panoramic camera was used in the 1921 reconnaissance of Mount Everest; also by Pictorialist and postcard publisher Robert Vere Scott; and by adventurers like Melvin Vaniman, and archaeologist Hiram Bingham III. Bingham, having first seen Machu Picchu in 1911, for his 1912 expedition wrote to George Eastman, who was to supply his photographic equipment;

...it would be extremely advisable to have one Panoram Kodak in the outfit ... Can you give me some advice on this? ... In many of the deep canyons where we are expecting to work, it needs a Panoram Kodak to show the opposite side of the mountain up to the top .... If you can give us three new 3A Specials, and one No. 4 Panoram we shall have nine Kodaks in the outfit and ought to be well equipped for the scientific work that lies ahead of us.

In World War I, Ernest Brooks and Canadian official war photographer, the Daily Mirror photojournalist William Rider-Rider both used the Panoram No.4. Even at mid-century the Panoram was being used; Josef Sudek started photographing with it in 1948 after being given one as a gift from friends, and commissioned by Jan Řesáč to photograph Prague for a book, he produced one of his most famous publications, Praha panoramaticka ("Prague Panoramic"), devoted to the format, though it was not published until 1959.
