= Robert Vere Scott =

Australian-born panoramic photographer of the early 1900s also practicing in America

- Born: 1877; Brisbane, Australia
- Died: c. 1944
- Known for: Photography

Robert Vere Scott (1877, Brisbane –c.1944 United States of America) was an Australian Pictorialist photographer known for his panoramic views. From 1918 he lived and worked in the United States, where he died sometime in the 1940s.

== Biography ==
Robert Vere Scott was born in Brisbane in 1877, son of a Scottish immigrant storekeeper father and an Australian mother, the seventh of their ten children.

== Photographer ==
Based in Port Pirie, South Australia, Scott was working as a photographer when he married in Adelaide in 1899. The source of his training in the medium is not recorded. In 1900 he was listed as a professional in Broken Hill but signed his images in the negative 'R. Vere Scott’ and sometimes used ‘Very Scott’ as his surname, but also occasionally ‘R. Scott’ and ‘R. V. Scott’. After moving to America in 1918 he signed work "Rovere Scott."

=== Panoramic photographs ===
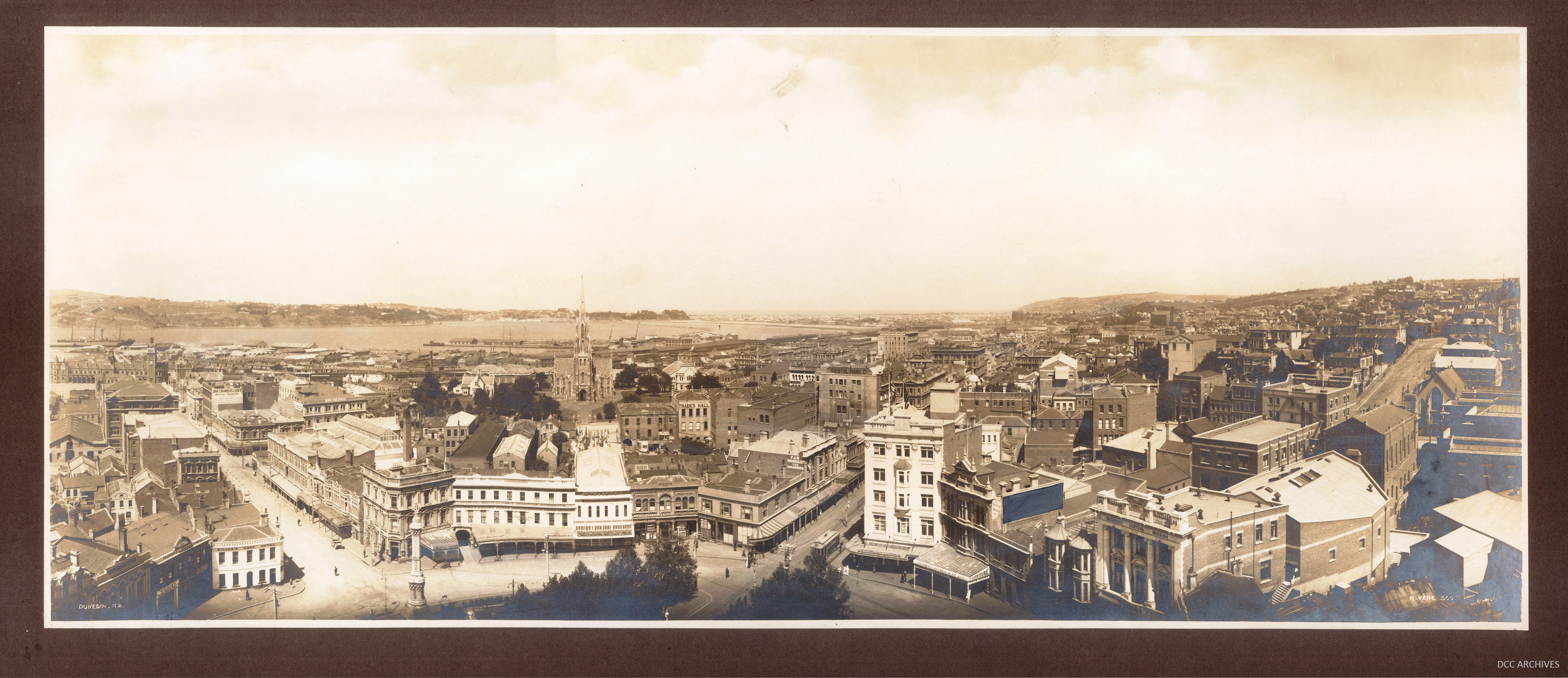
Robert Vere Scott (c.1914) View of Dunedin looking south over the Octagon

Scott's most important work was in the panoramic format. Photo historian Gael Newton has determined from the 16.0 x 50.0 cm format of his photograph "Camels and men gather at the start of the expedition to survey the Trans-Australian Railway" that he was using a Kodak Panoram No. 4 camera released in 1899, or the No. 1 of 1900. These panoramic cameras used 120 roll film for ease of use and had a rotating lens and curved back and encompassed a view of between 112 and 142 degrees. Panoramic views of course had been produced in Australia since the late 1840s but these turn-of-the-century cameras made it possible to encompass the whole view in a sweep on one piece of film, rather than laboriously piecing together panoramas from a series of separate glass plates. The popularity of his pictures convinced him to specialise in this class of work. Significant contemporaries of Scott were also using this instrument; Richard T. Maurice (1859–1909), H.H. Tilbrook (1884–1937), and Harry Phillips (1873–1944).

== Reputation ==
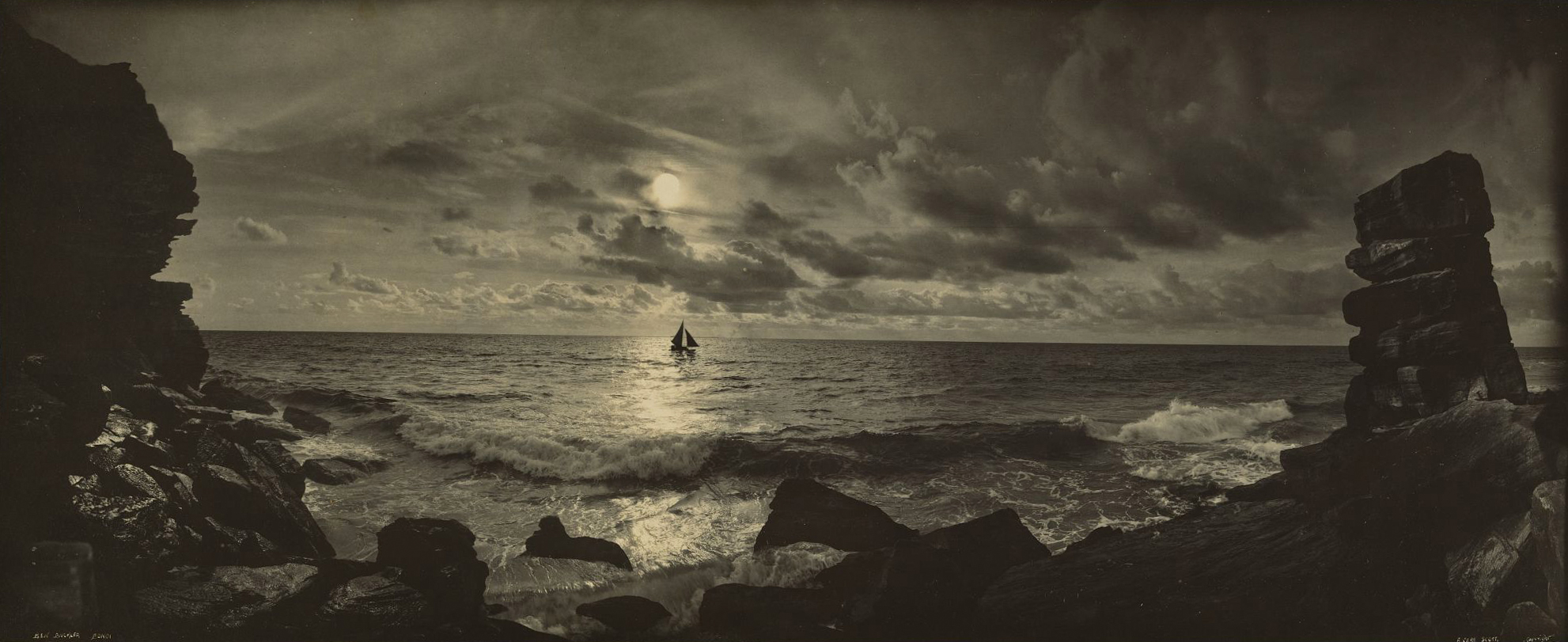
Robert Vere Scott (c.1905) Ben Buckler, Bondi, New South Wales, National Gallery of Australia

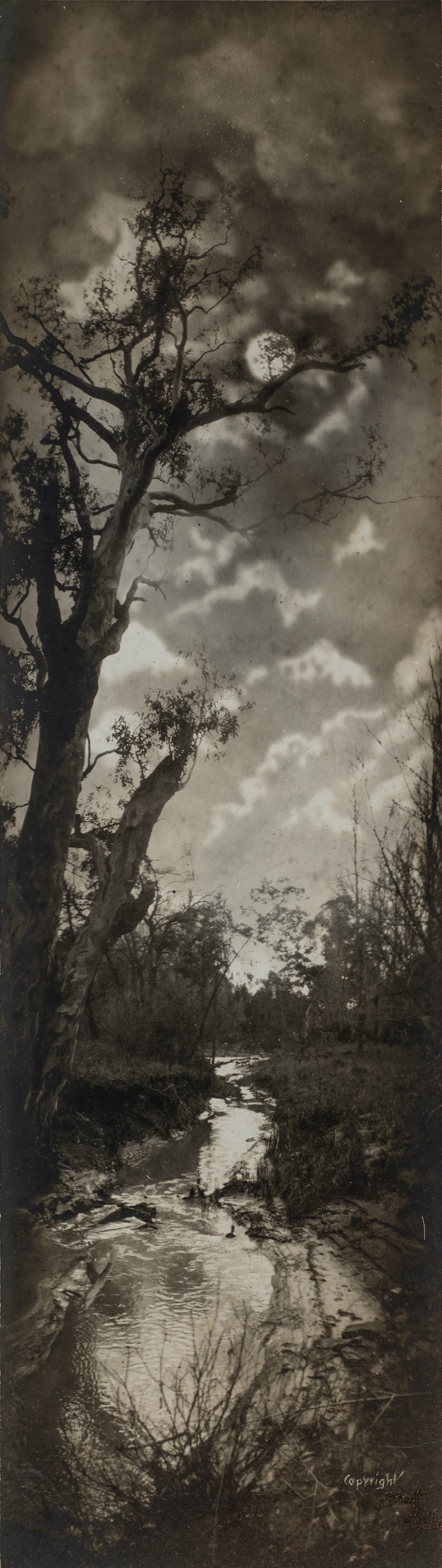
Photograph by Robert Vere Scott, c.1904/05, a rare vertical panorama, showing a view of Barkers Creek, collection of the Castlemaine Art Museum

The arrival during a well-publicised visit to Australia and New Zealand in 1902 of the flamboyant American panoramic photographer Melvin Vaniman (1866–1912) popularised the format in Australia. Significant in Scott's case, Vaniman was in Adelaide in 1904. From 1903 to 1907 Vere Scott continued to be based at Port Pirie, from where he explored markets further afield. For example, he produced panoramic pictures of Melbourne, and of Auckland, Sydney and Brisbane (held by the State Library of New South Wales) and dated around 1904.

By 1907 Vere Scott had achieved a high profile in South Australia. An article in The Adelaide Register of 19 December 1907 declared that Vere Scott had “‘recently imported the largest panoramic camera that had yet been brought to the Commonwealth, and that it was designed to take pictures 24 x 9 inches”. That camera may have been the more cumbersome Kodak Cirkut of 1904; a large format bellows camera that could be converted to make panoramas by mounting it on a clockwork turntable coupled to a spool of film that unrolled past a slit at the film plane, and was capable of 360º views with a resolution breathtaking even by current digital standards. Produced until 1949, it is used by some, even today.

Scott was issuing panoramic postcards and in 1908, after a move to Western Australia, was invited to judge the Boulder Technical School Camera Club competition. He embraced the Pictorialist photography movement that was particularly advanced in Adelaide in these years due largely to its promotion by Adelaide-born art photographer John Kauffmann (1864–1942). That Vere Scott was regarded as an equal to Kauffmann is seen by their equal billing and high profile in the Christmas number of the Adelaide newspaper The Observer. Beyond the traditional topographical factuality of his city views, the influence of this style is evident in Scott's exposure, printing and retouching (usually in skies) for chiaroscuro effects in his views, some being made to look as if taken by moonlight.

Around 1907 Vere Scott moved to Kalgoorlie, Western Australia and the prosperity of its new gold mining operations, where he was active in covering sports and other local events for the Kalgoorlie Western Argus and covered mining activities for a long article in The Lone Hand. He was soon travelling again: images of Wellington and Christchurch are dated 1910–14, and a Brisbane River view to 1915. A number of his images appeared in E.J.Brady's 1918 book Australia Unlimited.

== San Francisco ==
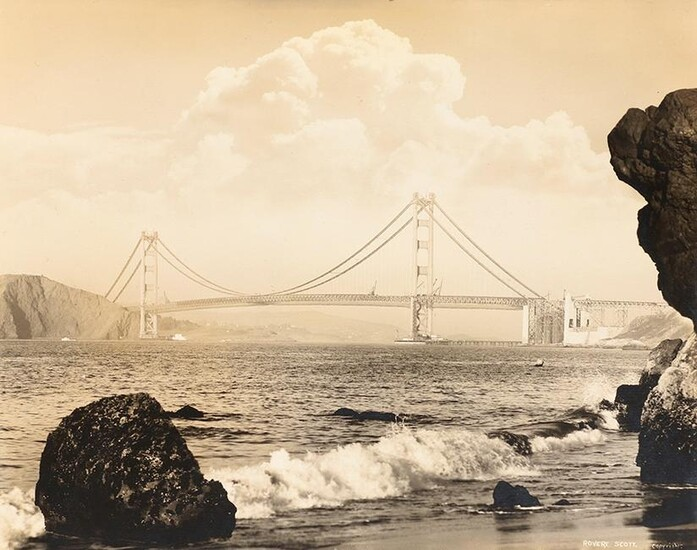
Rovere Scott aka Robert Vere Scott; Photo of Golden Gate Bridge c1937. 19cm H x 24cm W

In 1916 Scott migrated with his wife and children to California where his brothers George, Henry and Alfred had already settled. He set up a studio at 340 Kearny Street, San Francisco in 1918, and lived in Berkeley. By 1920 he had moved to 21 Stockton Street, near Geary, San Francisco, where he was advertising prints for 50 cents each. He contributed panoramic and other imagery of nautical activities on San Francisco Bay to yachting and boating magazines, and his pictures, examples of which he donated to the California Historical Society in 1936, provide a valuable record of the landscape of the city. He was a member of the Seattle Camera Club probably through correspondence and contribution of photos for exhibits, and was producing panoramic views well into the 1930s. His residence is listed as Boston and occupation "scenic photographer" on his WW2 draft registration card of April 1942.

== Personal life ==
Scott's American draft registration card in WWI of September 12, 1918, records "Robert Scott, photographer, resident of 594, 62nd Street, Oakland, Alameda County, CA.," as "Tall Height, Medium Build, Blue Eyes, and Brown Hair, 3 Fingers from left hand lost, physically disqualified." He separated from his wife in 1920 and in 1924 briefly returned to Sydney where another brother James lived, then returned to San Francisco in September 1924, after which no securely dated images from Australia in the 1920s have been located. Scott may have married again in the USA around 1928. He died in 1944.

== Collections ==
Some fifty works are held in Australian public and private collections:

- National Gallery of Australia
- Queensland Gallery of Art
- State Library of New South Wales
- State Library of Victoria
- Castlemaine Art Museum

The fate of the Scott archive is unknown, and none of his negatives are known to have survived.
