= Melvin Vaniman =

American aviator and photographer (1866–1912)

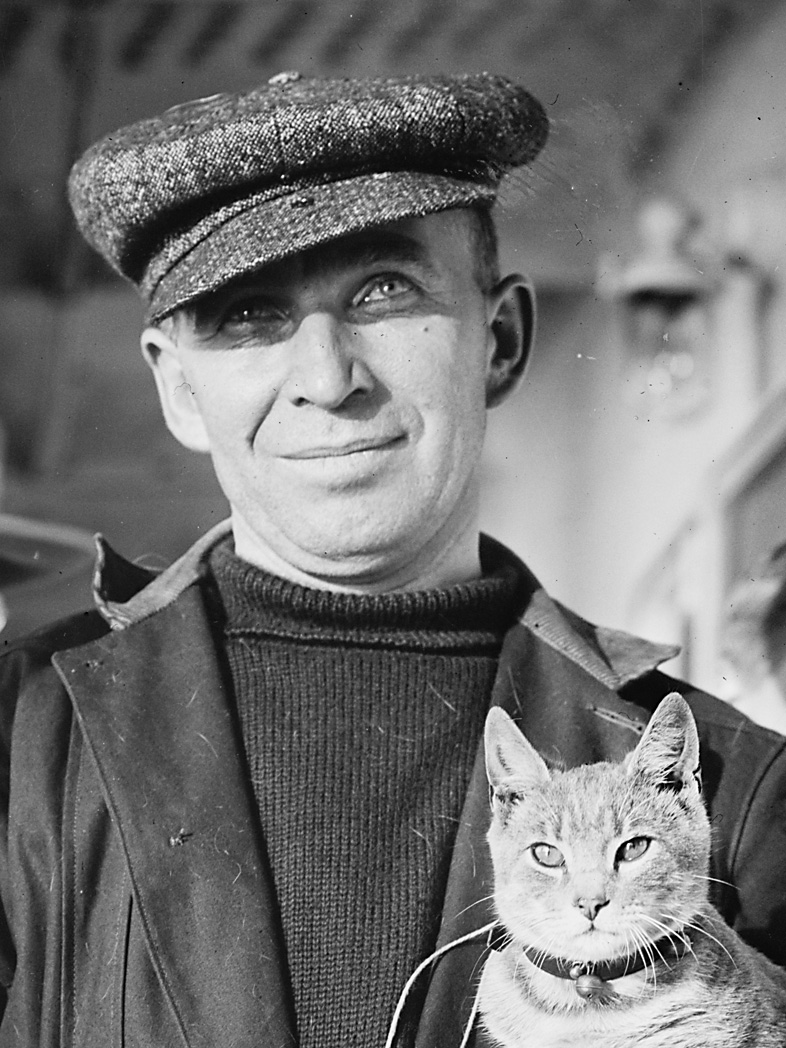
- Vaniman and Kiddo the cat
- Born: Chester Melvin Vaniman; October 30, 1866; Virden, Illinois, U.S.
- Died: July 2, 1912 (aged 45) off Atlantic City, New Jersey, U.S.
- Education: Valparaiso University
- Occupations: Aviator, photographer

Chester Melvin Vaniman (October 30, 1866 – July 2, 1912) was an American aviator and photographer who specialized in panoramic images. He shot images from gas balloons, ships masts, tall buildings and even a home-made 30-metre (98 ft) pole. He scaled buildings, hung from self-made slings, and scaled dangerous heights to capture his unique images.

== Early life ==
Born to a farming family in Virden, Illinois, Vaniman was the eldest of four sons and attended Valparaiso University in Indiana and Chicago.

== Career ==
=== Photography ===
Vaniman's photographic career began in Hawaii in 1901, and ended some time in 1904. He spent over a year photographing Australia and New Zealand on behalf of the Oceanic Steamship Company, creating promotional images for the company, many as panoramas and which popularised the format in Australia, which was taken up with enthusiasm by Robert Vere Scott among others. During this time the New Zealand Government also commissioned panoramas.

Beginning in 1903, he spent over a year photographing Sydney and the surrounding areas. It was during this time that he created his best known work, the panorama of Sydney, shot from a hot air balloon he had specially imported from the United States. Vaniman is best known for his images of Hawaii, Australia, and New Zealand.

=== Aerial exploration ===
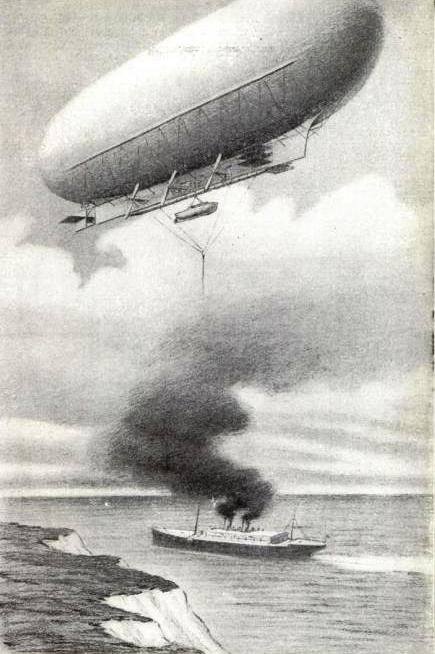
The airship Akron

Some time around 1904, Vaniman gave up photography and took up exploration. This included aborted expeditions to the North Pole and the Trans-Atlantic crossing, both of which were attempted in Walter Wellman's airship America.

At the first attempt to cross the Atlantic in 1910, Vaniman sent one of the first aerial radio transmissions when he urged the launch boat to "come and get this goddamn cat!" The cat, named Kiddo, apparently had an aversion to airship travel and had caused such a ruckus that it finally had to be placed inside a gunny sack and suspended below the gondola.

During the anticipated five-day crossing, the airship's motor failed after 38 hours, leaving it adrift over the Atlantic until the crew and Kiddo were rescued two days later by a passing Royal Mail steamship, the SS Trent. The America slowly drifted away and disappeared into the mist, never to be seen again.

== Death ==
On the morning of July 2, 1912, Vaniman and his crew of four were killed during his second attempt at a trans-Atlantic airship crossing when his dirigible, the Goodyear built Akron, (not the later US Navy airship of the same name) exploded off the shore of Atlantic City, New Jersey. Filled with 40,000 cubic feet of hydrogen, the Akron was the first American airship that could compare to the better known European manufactured models of the period. The Akron had been airborne for only a few minutes when the airship suddenly exploded offshore in view of a crowd of 20,000 spectators, including the wives of Vaniman and his crew, who watched in horror as the burning gondola fell from the sky and plunged into an inlet. The other victims were Vaniman's brother, Calvin Vaniman, Fred Elmer, George Bourtillion, and Walter Guest. Subsequent investigation indicated that internal pressure possibly from overinflation of hydrogen had ruptured the envelope. The body of Calvin Vaniman was recovered later that afternoon; the bodies of Melvin Vaniman and the other victims were found three days later.
