= Walter Wellman =

American journalist and explorer (1858–1934)

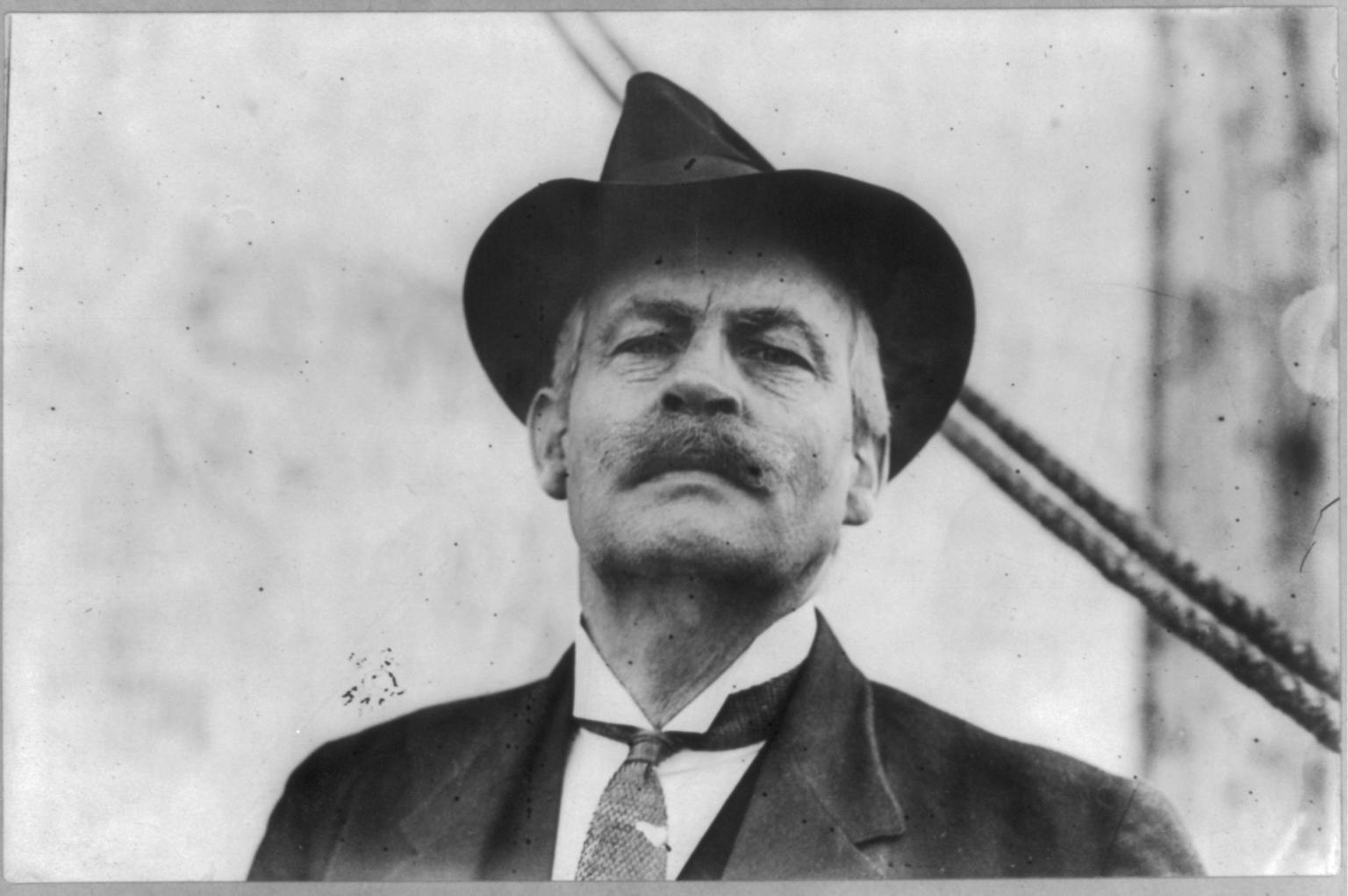
Walter Wellman in 1910

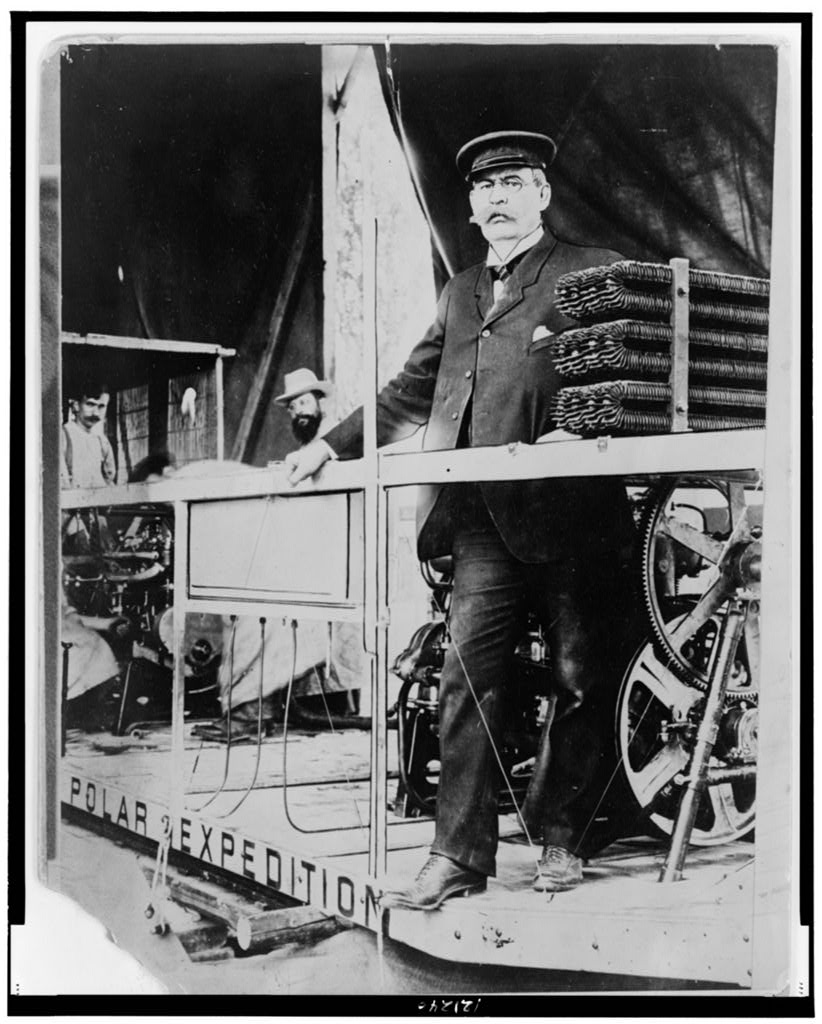
Walter Wellman, standing on deck of airship

Walter E. Wellman (November 3, 1858 – January 31, 1934) was an American journalist, explorer, and aeronaut.

== Biographical background ==
Walter Wellman was born in Mentor, Ohio, in 1858. He was the sixth son of Alonzo Wellman and the fourth by his second wife Minerva Sibilla (Graves) Wellman. Walter's father, Alonzo, served three years in the American Civil War while Walter was young. He was initially with Company D of the 105th Ohio Infantry before becoming a ship-carpenter with the Mississippi River Squadron. When he returned from the war, he took his family west from Ohio to become pioneer settlers of York County, Nebraska.

At age 14 Walter established a weekly newspaper in Sutton, Nebraska. At age 21 Walter returned to Ohio to establish the Cincinnati Evening Post and married Laura McCann in Canton, Ohio on 24 December 1879. They had five daughters. In 1884 he became political and Washington DC correspondent for the Chicago Herald and Record-Herald.

== Early exploration ==
=== San Salvador ===
For a news story, Wellman was asked by the Chicago Herald to visit and assess various candidates for the initial landing place of Christopher Columbus in the Americas. He marked the presumed location on San Salvador Island in the Bahamas with a monument in 1892.

=== Svalbard ===
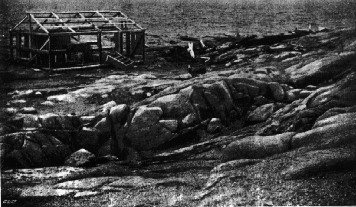
Ruins of Wellman's hut on Waldenøya (1897)

In 1894, Wellman led a polar expedition. He chartered the Norwegian ice steamer Ragnvald Jarl from Ålesund and assembled a team of 14 expedition members, mostly from the US and Norway. After an easy passage to the north of Svalbard, the ship reached the ice pack at Waldenøya. With sledges and aluminium boats, the expedition made their way to Martensøya from where they intended to continue to the pole when the Ragnwald Jarl lying at Waldenøya was pierced by ice and sank. Wellman gave up his polar ambitions and instead explored the northeast of Svalbard, reaching a latitude of 81° N. The exploring party and the ship's crew then retreated to Lågøya, where they were found by the Norwegian seal-hunting ship Berntine. Wellman offered the captain 800 $ for taking the whole expedition back immediately.

=== Franz Josef Land ===
Wellman made another attempt on the North Pole in 1898. Evelyn Briggs Baldwin was his second-in-command. Two more Americans and five Norwegians, among them Paul Bjørvig and Bernt Bentsen, completed the expedition.

They sailed from Tromsø in the chartered ice steamer Frithjof. After arriving at Cape Flora, they gathered supplies left by the Jackson-Harmsworth expedition, before sailing east, in an attempt to find a navigable path northward. Due to the extent of the ice, Wellman was finally forced to erect his base camp, "Harmsworth House", at Cape Tegetthoff on Hall Island. The ship then left the expedition, without Wellman having made any arrangements for a relief ship to bring them home again. He left that to his agent Andreas Aagaard in Tromsø.

On 5 August, he sent Baldwin and three Norwegians to establish an advance camp further north, preferably at Cape Fligely. With inadequate equipment and untrained dogs, the party made very slow progress, hauling and rowing much of the equipment by hand. They eventually reached Cape Heller on Wilczek Land where Baldwin had the Norwegians construct a hut he named "Fort McKinley". On 22 October Baldwin left Bjørvig and Bentsen for the winter to guard their northern outpost with minimal supplies. They were left with no medicine, were to use no fuel for heating and consume no food other than walrus and polar bears. Bentsen soon fell ill and became delirious. He died on 2 January 1899. Bjørvig continued to share his sleeping bag with Bentsen's corpse throughout the winter so as not to attract polar bears.

The other expedition members had been wintering in relative comfort at Harmsworth House. Wellman, who had fallen out with Baldwin over the bad leadership of the sledge expedition, made his way to Fort McKinley in February 1899 with the remaining three Norwegians. Together they buried Bentsen, before continuing north with their sledges. This effort was cut short when Wellman broke his leg after slipping on the ice on 21 March at 81°40' N. The next day, a storm broke up the piece of ice they were camping on. As a result, the expedition lost 14 dogs and nearly all of their provisions and equipment. The Norwegians managed to drag Wellman back to the safety of Harmsworth House on a sledge.

With Wellman himself out of action, he instructed Baldwin to return with the four Norwegians to the fairly unexplored Wilczek Land, in the hopes of finding some new geographical features. The discovery of Graham Bell Island proved to be the expedition's greatest success. Wellman named the island after Alexander Graham Bell, the inventor and president of the National Geographical Society which had sponsored the expedition. He also named many bays, islets and other geographical features after prominent American figures.

The expedition was taken home on 27 July 1899 by the sealing ship Capella.

== Airships ==
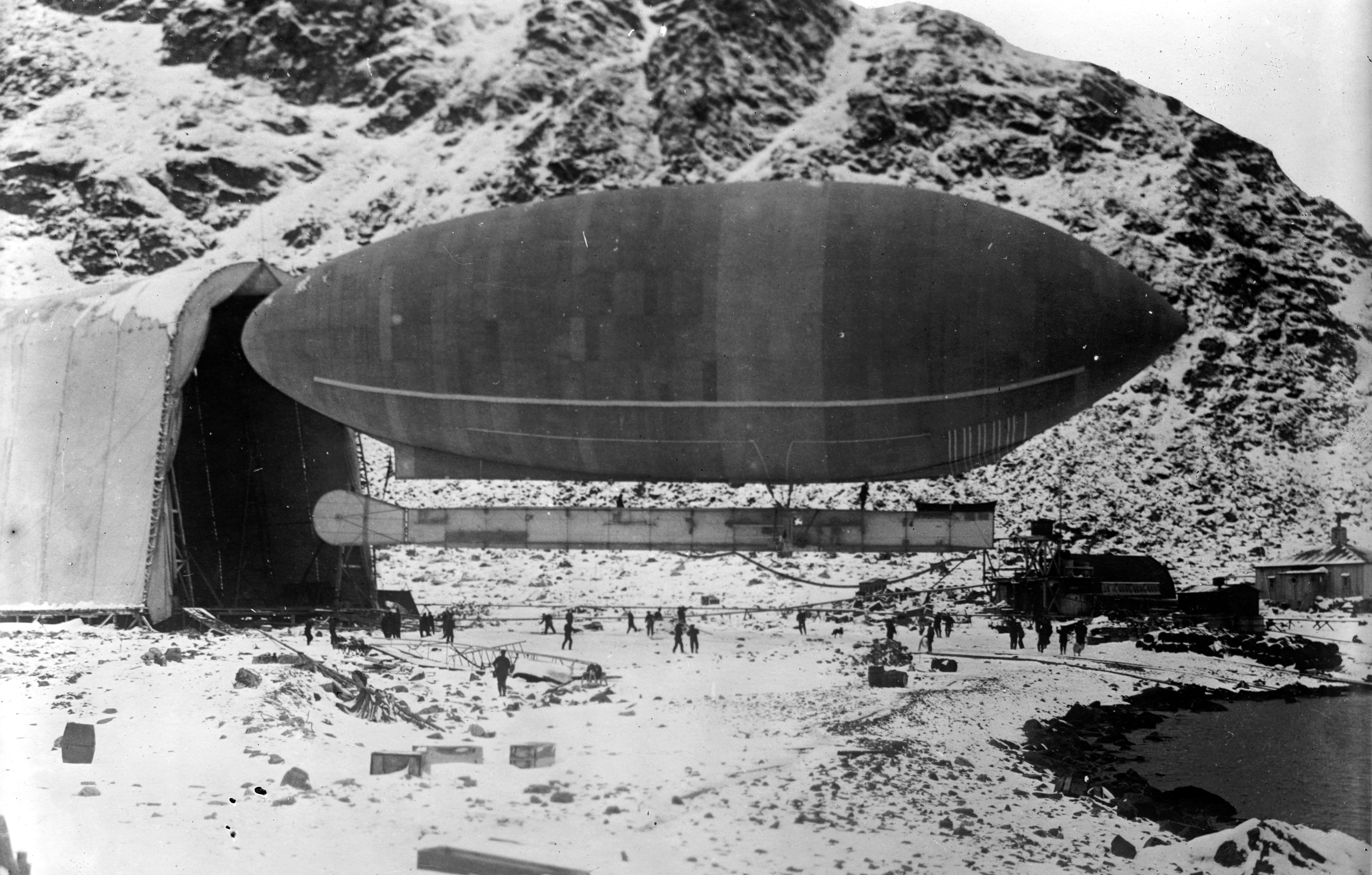
Wellman's America at Spitzbergen

On December 31, 1905, Wellman announced he would make an attempt to reach the North Pole, but this time with an airship. His newspaper provided funds of US$250,000, and he had an airship built in Paris for the Wellman Chicago Record-Herald Polar Expedition. Wellman established expedition headquarters on Dane's Island, Svalbard, in the summer of 1906. The hangar was not completed until August 1906, and the airship's engines self-destructed when tested. Wellman rebuilt the airship in Paris that winter and attempted an aerial voyage to the North Pole in September, 1907. He made a second attempt without financial assistance in 1909, but mechanical failures forced him to turn back 60 miles (97 km) north of Svalbard.

In the northern autumn of 1910, Wellman expanded his airship America to 345,000 cubic feet (9,800 cubic metres) and launched from Atlantic City, New Jersey on 15 October 1910. The engineer Melvin Vaniman sent one of the first aerial radio transmissions when he urged the launch boat to "come and get this goddam cat!" - the cat, Kiddo, was initially quite unhappy about being airborne, caused such a ruckus that he was placed in a gunny sack and suspended below the gondola. After 38 hours the engine failed and the airship drifted until the crew and cat were rescued by the Royal Mail steamship Trent not far from Bermuda. In July, 1912, Melvin Vaniman made another attempt at crossing the Atlantic in a second airship, the Akron, built by Goodyear. The Akron exploded a few minutes after departing Atlantic City on its trans-Atlantic flight, killing Vaniman and his crew of four. Nearly a century later, its submerged remains were located. These fragments and the airship's lifeboat, which Goodyear had stored since 1912, were then donated to the Smithsonian Institution.

== Legacy ==
In 1902, Wellman wrote A Tragedy of the Far North published in The White World. Wellman's book The Aerial Age: A Thousand Miles by Airship over the Atlantic Ocean was published in 1911. The German Republic was published in 1916. The Force Supreme was published in 1918.

He spent his final years in New York City, where he died of liver cancer in 1934. The Liberty ship Walter Wellman was launched 29 September 1944 from Todd Houston Shipbuilding Corporation of Houston, Texas.

== See also ==
- R33-class airship
