= America (airship) =

Blimp used by Walter Wellman (1906–10)

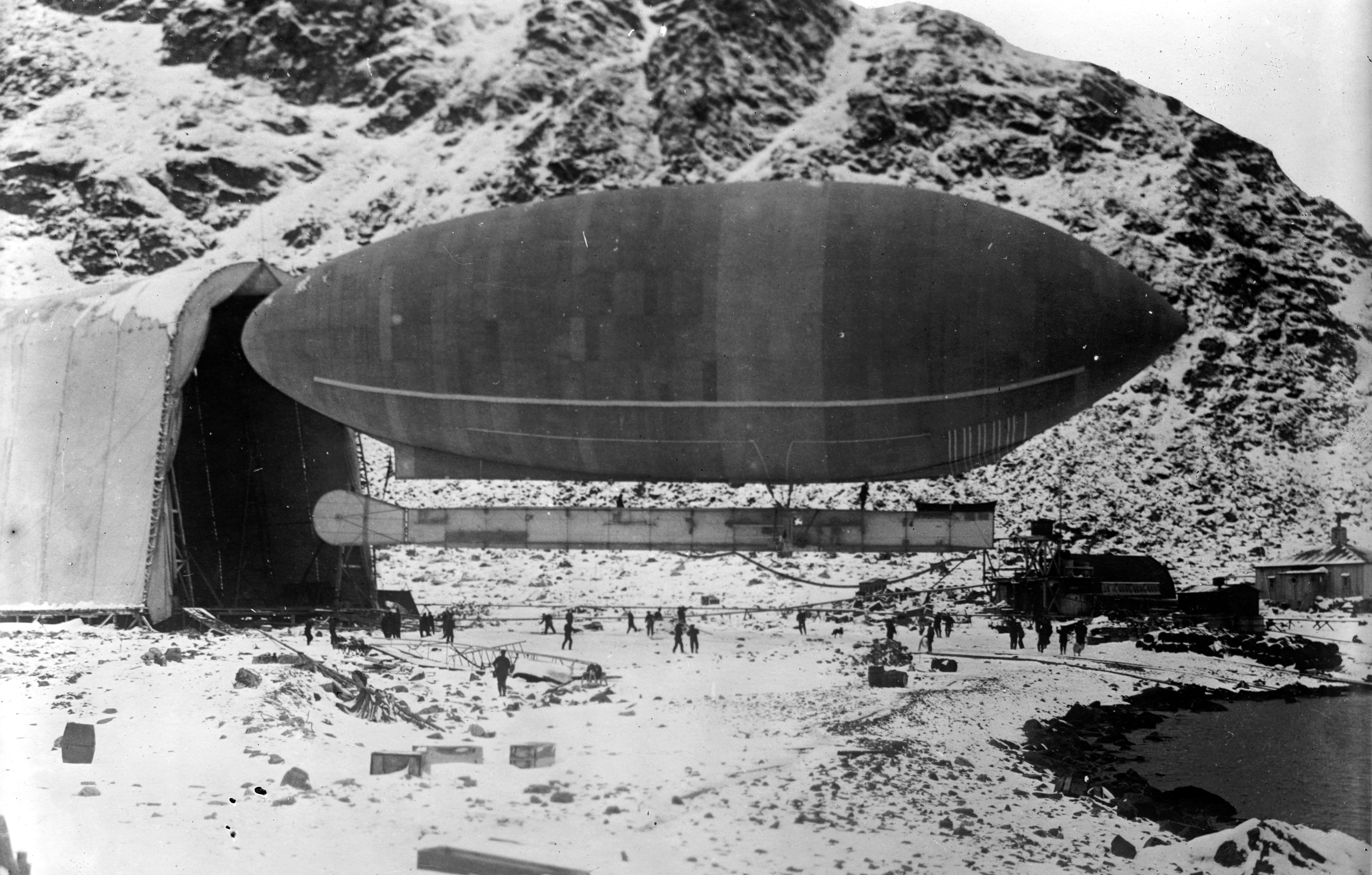
- Airship America at Spitzbergen, with its hangar, 1906 or 1907

General information
- Type: non-rigid airship
- Manufacturer: Louis Mutin Godard
- Owners: Wellman Chicago Record-Herald Polar Expedition Company

History
- Manufactured: 1906
- First flight: 1906
- In service: 1906–10
- Fate: Abandoned by occupants south of Nova Scotia.

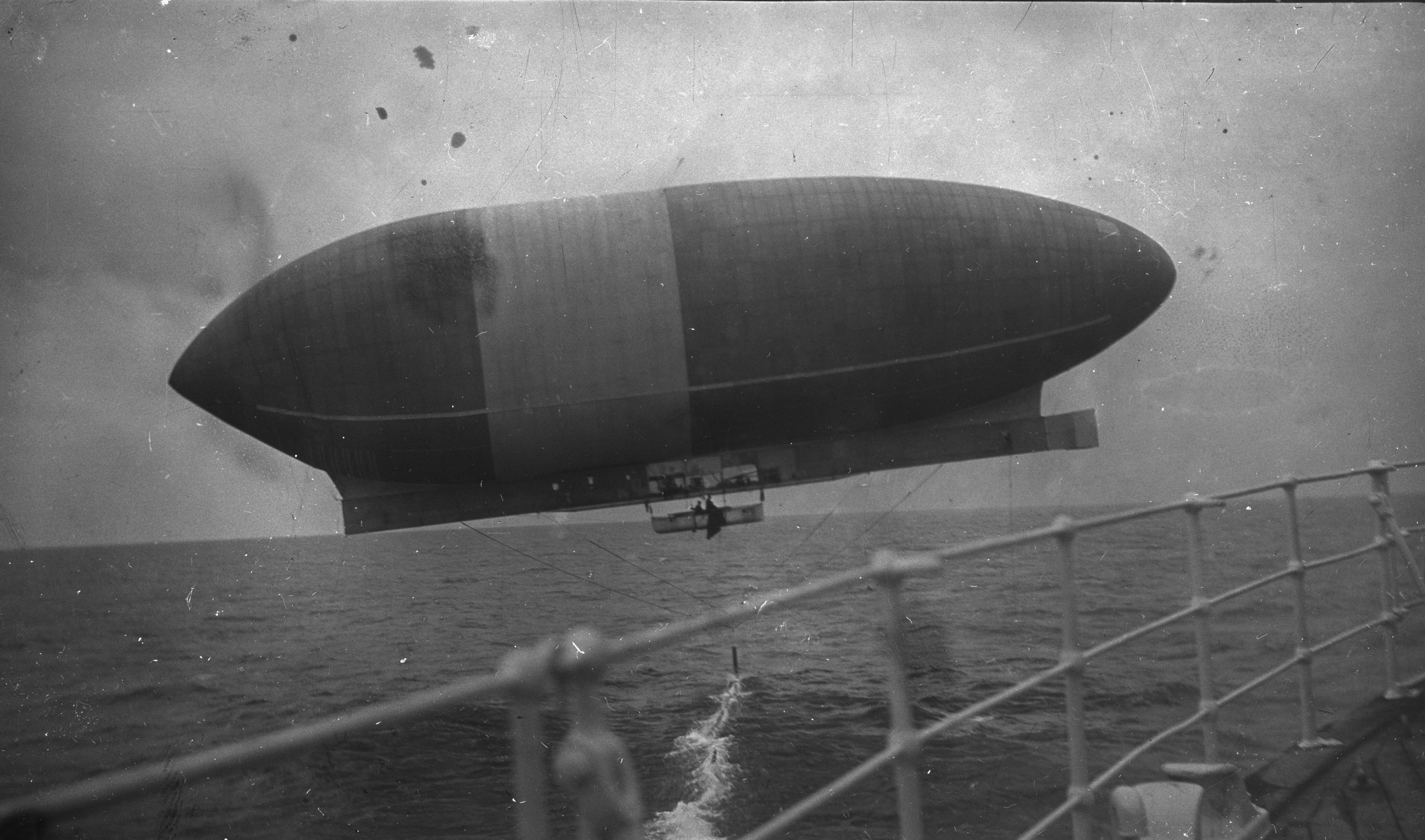
Airship America seen from the deck of the steamship Trent, October 1910.

The America was a non-rigid airship built by Louis Mutin Godard in France in 1906 for the journalist Walter Wellman's attempt to reach the North Pole by air. Wellman first conceived of using a balloon to fly to the pole during a failed polar attempt by boat and sledge from Svalbard in 1894. He then visited Paris to review the state of balloon technology but left disappointed by the lack of acceptable steering and propulsion capability. A decade later while at the 1905 Portsmouth Peace Conference he learned of recent innovations in French dirigible design and believed a solution might be at hand for his Arctic aerial plan. After receiving the backing of newspaper publisher Victor F. Lawson, the Wellman Chicago Record-Herald Polar Expedition was announced, and Wellman traveled to Paris in search of a suitable design and manufacturer. In the meantime a public company was established to raise the $US 250,000 required for the expedition and airship (to which Lawson contributed $60,000).

As originally constructed, the America was 165 ft (50 m) long and 51 ft 10 in (15.80 m) wide at its greatest diameter and enclosed a volume of 258,000 cubic feet (7,300 m^{3}) of hydrogen. The envelope was of three layers of fabric and three of rubber, and contained no internal framework. The gondola could hold a crew of five, and power was supplied by three internal-combustion engines delivering a total of 80 hp (60 kW) to two propellers, one fore and one aft. It was delivered by ship to Spitsbergen on July 8, 1906, where Wellman and his team attempted to erect it. Their efforts met with failure when the engines fell apart. In September, the America was dismantled and returned by ship to France.

Wellman returned to Spitsbergen with the America in June the following year, 1907. The airship had a new centre-section sewn into it to increase its length to 185 ft (56 m) and volume to 272,000 cubic feet (7,700 m^{3}). The weather was very unfavourable, however, and it was 2 September before the America could even leave the hangar. Wasting no time, Wellman launched later that day with mechanic Melvin Vaniman and navigator Felix Riesenberg in an attempt to reach the pole. Unfortunately, more bad weather forced this to be abandoned after only a few miles and the America was deflated to avoid a crash landing. America once again returned to France for repairs.

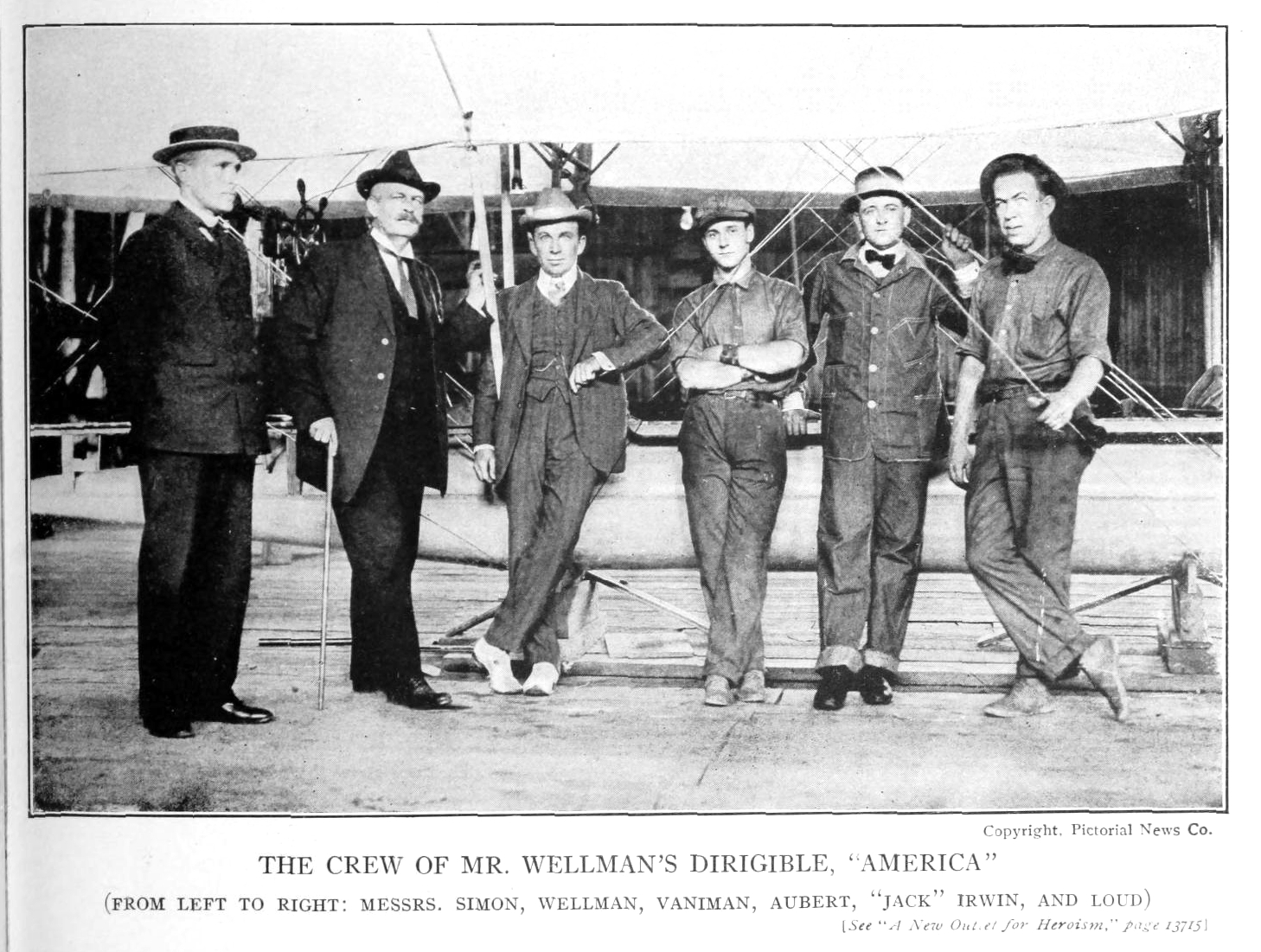
Picture of the crew

She returned to Spitsbergen one more time in July 1909, and at 10 AM on 15 August, launched with Wellman, Vaniman, Russian balloonist Nicolas Popov and Vaniman's brother-in-law Albert Louis Loud on board. The flight began well enough, but two hours and 40 miles (64 km) later, a device Wellman called the "equilibrator" failed. This was a long, leather tube filled with ballast that was intended to help gauge and maintain a fixed altitude over the ice. America gained altitude rapidly, until brought under control at 5,000 ft (1,500 m) and gradually lowered back to the ground by venting hydrogen. The crew was rescued by the Norwegian steamer Farm. Wellman began plans to extend the hangar so that he could return the following year with a larger airship, but on learning of Dr. Frederick Cook's claim to have reached the pole, abandoned the adventure.

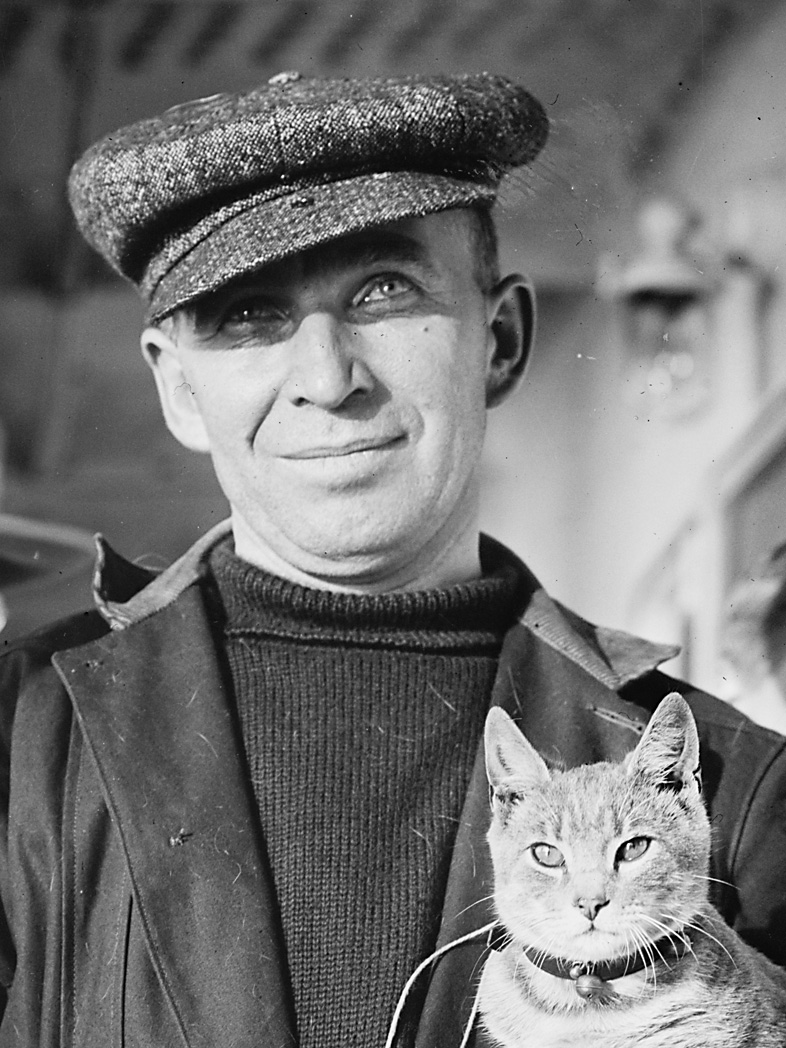
Melvin Vaniman and Kiddo, the feline mascot of the airship America

Instead, Wellman resolved to make the first aerial crossing of the Atlantic Ocean. He had the America enlarged again, now to 345,000 ft^{3} (9,800 m^{3}). A spark gap radio set was added to the underhanging life boat and operator Jack Irwin used it during the flight, callsign "W", and with the frame of the airship as the antenna. Given the airship was inflated with hydrogen, this was a very dangerous system. The unit made some of the first air-to-ground transmissions, when the airship's engineer Melvin Vaniman sent one of the first aerial radio transmissions urging the launch boat to "come and get this goddam cat!" – the cat Kiddo who was initially quite unhappy about being airborne and caused such a ruckus, that for a time he was placed in a gunny sack and suspended beneath the gondola.

On 15 October 1910, takeoff was made from Atlantic City. Condensing water on the airship's skin added excess weight, and it was difficult to gain height. A passing storm also made forward navigation difficult. The engines failed 38 hours into the flight, apparently due to contamination by beach sand, and America drifted. The crew jettisoned all excess weight, including one of the defunct engines. The ship had gone as far as a point east of New Hampshire and south of Nova Scotia before floating generally south.

After another 33 hours, and having now traveled a total distance of 1,370 miles (2,200 km) from launching, they sighted the Royal Mail steamship Trent west of Bermuda. After attracting the ship's attention by a signaling lamp using Morse code, Irwin made the first aerial distress call by radio. The crew, and mascot cat Kiddo, got into the lifeboat and, after opening the gas valves on the airship, abandoned the America. The airship drifted out of sight and was never seen again. Trent, having barely avoided running down the lifeboat in a high crosswind, was able to rescue the crew and returned them to New York. The first successful aerial crossings of the Atlantic came nine years later.

== See also ==
- Spitsbergen Airship Museum
- List of missing aircraft
