= The World in 1492 =

- First edition
- Author: Jean Fritz, Katherine Paterson, Patricia and Fredrick McKissack, Margaret Mahy, Jamake Highwater
- Illustrator: Stefano Vitale
- Language: English
- Subject: Children's literature, History
- Published: 1992 (Henry Holt and Company)
- Publication place: USA
- Media type: Print (hardback, paperback)
- Pages: 168
- ISBN: 9780805016741
- OCLC: 25631979

The World in 1492 is a 1992 children's history book that discusses various aspects of world history up to 1492.

== Reception ==
Booklist, reviewing The World in 1492, wrote "Despite flashes of insight and some excellent writing, too much of the book settles back into standard historical accounts of rulers, events, and cultures, sometimes centuries before or after 1492." but also found value in the histories dealing outside North America and Europe. The Harvard Educational Review, in discussing multiculturalism in children's literature, emphasised a review by New Advocate of five books that were published in 1992 to commemorate the Colombian Quincentenary including The World in 1492 and wrote "Perhaps the most serious fault that Bigelow [New Advocate reviewer] noted is the neglect within "all the new literature to link history to contemporary social problems" (p. 266). The books never address "the most important questions of a critical multicultural curriculum: So what? How does history help us understand and improve our world today?" (pp. 266–267)."

The World in 1492 has also been reviewed by Kirkus Reviews, and Publishers Weekly.

It is a 1994 NCTE Kaleidoscope book
