= Margot Tomes =

American artist and illustrator (1917 – 1991

- Born: Margot Ladd Tomes; August 10, 1917; Yonkers, New York
- Died: June 25, 1991 (aged 73); New York, New York
- Known for: Illustrator

Margot Ladd Tomes (August 10, 1917 – June 25, 1991) was an American artist and illustrator of children's books. Books that she illustrated have been among The New York Times Best Illustrated Children's Books of the Year, Jack and the Wonder Beans in 1977 and If There Were Dreams to Sell in 1984. She also provided illustrations for Jean Fritz’s Newbery Honor Book and American Book Award Homesick: My Own Story in 1982.

== Life and career ==
Tomes was born in Park Hill, Yonkers, New York City, a cousin of painter Guy Pène du Bois, costume designer Raoul Pene Du Bois, and author & illustrator William Pène du Bois. After graduating from Pratt Institute, she began a career as a highly-regarded designer of wallpaper and fabric. In 1959, she illustrated her first book The Breaking Point by Daphne du Maurier. In 1963, at age 46, Tomes focused full time on illustrating children's books. She illustrated over 60 titles during her career including Aaron and the Green Mountain Boys, The Secret of Sachem’s Tree, And then what happened, Paul Revere?, and numerous fairy tales such as Hansel and Gretel, and The Sorcerer’s Apprentice. Her drawings were known for their meticulous attention to detail. Her longtime friend, Edward Gorey said of Tomes work “I always wanted to draw like her—I loved her work. I was terribly envious of her ability, and she had an incredible sense of color.”

She died from pancreatic cancer in 1991.

Tomes was a posthumous recipient of the Kerlan Award in 1995, where the majority of her original artwork resides in the University of Minnesota Collection. A selection of her work was included in the exhibition "The Picture Book Re-Imagined" in 2016, curated by Leonard Marcus.

== Other sources ==
- Fifth Book of Junior Authors & Illustrators, vol. 36, pp. 186–90.
- Illustrators of Children's Books: 1957-1966, p. 182.
- Something About the Author, vol. 36, pp. 186–90.
