= The Breaking Point (short story collection) =

1959 short story collection by Daphne du Maurier

- First US edition
- Author: Daphne du Maurier
- Illustrator: Margot Tomes
- Language: English
- Publisher: Gollancz (UK); Doubleday (US)
- Publication date: 1959
- Publication place: United Kingdom
- Media type: Print
- Pages: 287 (UK)
- OCLC: 3047815

The Breaking Point is a collection of eight short stories by Daphne du Maurier first published in 1959 by Victor Gollancz in the UK and Doubleday in the US. It has also been published under the title The Blue Lenses and Other Stories. The stories were written at a time when du Maurier herself came close to a severe nervous breakdown and reflect her own psychological stress. Du Maurier herself acknowledged she had come close to madness immediately before she wrote them; and they were part of her cure – "the means by which she wrote herself back to sanity". The original book had illustrations before each story by Margot Tomes.

== Stories ==
- "The Alibi" – In an attempt to escape his dull existence John Fenton starts a double life, randomly picking a house he plans to murder its occupants, a single mother and her son, but instead finds release in painting them in oils.
- "The Blue Lenses" – After several weeks recovering from eye-surgery a woman has her bandages removed. To her astonishment and then horror people viewed through the implanted blue lenses are seen as animals: cows, weasel, snakes, frogs etc. Further surgery is later required.
- "Ganymede" – A classical scholar becoming besotted with a young waiter in Piazza San Marco whilst holidaying in Venice, with tragic results.
- "The Pool" – A girl escapes from her younger brother and is enticed via an overgrown garden pool into a secret magical world.
- "The Archduchess" – Tells of how revolution and death come to the idyllic European kingdom of Ronda.
- "The Menace" – Movie heart-throb Barry Jeans has been top of the box-office ratings for many years but with the advent of the 'feelies' (where actors are wired-up and their feelings recorded for playback) he is found wanting.
- "The Chamois" – A hunter travels to Kalabaka in the Pindus of Greece to hunt the elusive chamois.
- "The Lordly Ones" – A mute boy moves with his parents from Exeter to the 'moors' where one night he meets and joins "The Lordly Ones".

== Reception ==
- Kirkus Reviews began "A haunting series of stories, in most cases putting it up to the reader to interpret the final outcome – in all cases using the device of the moment in life when emotion or reason reaches the point of tension beyond which something snaps", and finished with "In this collection...Daphne du Maurier's peerless craftmanship, her eerie sense of the macabre, her gift for sheer story telling come to full fruition."
- Simon Savidge writes "This is a fantastic collection of short stories be you a fan of Daphne or not! If you like complex and psychological, suspenseful and dark, if you like looking into the depths of the human mind or if you just want a fantastic read I cannot recommend this collection strongly enough. Daphne once again delivers, and it’s a treat for all those who turn the pages."

== Adaptation ==
- "The Alibi" was adapted for BBC Radio 4's Afternoon Play in 2007 by Vanessa Rosenthal, starring Michael Maloney and Lia Williams
- "Ganymede" was adapted for the BBC World Service in 1974 starring John Le Mesurier, Anthony Daniels and David Gooderson
- A reading of "The Blue Lenses" by Emma Fielding was broadcast on BBC Radio 7 in 2008
