= The Cabin Faced West =

1958 novel by Jean Fritz

- Author: Jean Fritz
- Illustrator: Feodor Rojankovsky
- Language: English
- Publisher: G.P. Putnam's Sons
- Publication date: 1958
- Publication place: United States
- Media type: Print (paperback)
- Pages: 124 pp
- OCLC: 300893

The Cabin Faced West is an historical children's novel by the American writer Jean Fritz.

== Plot ==
Set in 1784 on Hamilton Hill, Washington County, Pennsylvania, near the Monongahela River some 20 miles south of Pittsburgh, this historical novel for children features ten-year-old Ann Hamilton. The Hamilton family has settled in "The Western Country" from the other side of the Allegheny Mountains from Gettysburg, and Ann is homesick for her friends and the comforts of civilization. Ann's only friend on Hamilton Hill is Andy McPhale, the son of squatter, and she takes on the project of teaching Andy to read and write. The story concludes with a visit by George Washington himself, who is inspecting his properties in the region and looking for a place to sup.

== A True Story ==
In a postscript to her readers author Jean Fritz says that the story of Ann Hamilton is a true family story, Fritz being her great-great-granddaughter. She reprints George Washington's diary entry of September 18, 1784 recording the visit. Hamilton Hill is known as Ginger Hill today and is near the borough of New Eagle.
