= Jean Fritz =

American children's writer (1915–2017)

- Born: Jean Guttery; November 16, 1915; Hankow, China
- Died: May 14, 2017 (aged 101); Sleepy Hollow, New York, U.S.
- Education: Wheaton College
- Occupation: Writer
- Spouse: Michael Fritz
- Writing career
- Language: English
- Period: 1954–2017
- Genres: Children's novels, biography, memoir
- Subjects: American biography and history
- Notable awards: Children's Literature Legacy Award; 1986

Jean Guttery Fritz (November 16, 1915 – May 14, 2017) was an American children's writer best known for American biography and history. She won the Children's Legacy Literature Award for her career contribution to American children's literature in 1986. She turned 100 in November 2015 and died in May 2017 at the age of 101.

== Early life ==
Fritz was born to American Presbyterian missionaries Arthur Minton Guttery and the former Myrtle Chaney in Hankow, China, where she lived until she was twelve. Growing up, she attended a British school and kept a journal about her days in China with her amah, Lin Nai-Nai. The family emigrated to the United States when she was in eighth grade.

She graduated from Wheaton College in Massachusetts in 1937 and married Michael Fritz in 1941. They had two children, David and Andrea.

== Career ==
Fritz's writing career started with the publication of several short stories in Humpty Dumpty magazine early in the 1950s. Her first book, Bunny Hopwell's First Spring, was published in 1954 and followed in 1955 by 121 Pudding Street, a work based on her own children. She often wrote westerns and other stories of frontier America because Arthur told her stories of American heroes as she was growing up. Her first historical novel for children was The Cabin Faced West (1958). Her autobiography, Homesick, My Own Story (1982), won a National Book Award for Young People's Literature in the Children's Fiction category and was a runner-up for the Newbery Medal.

The latter American Library Association (ALA) award recognizes the year's best American children's book but almost always goes to fiction. Later, Fritz won two annual Boston Globe–Horn Book Awards for children's nonfiction. (Note: Fritz was a runner-up for a Boston Globe–Horn Book Award four times from 1974 to 1983, three times in the Nonfiction category and in Fiction for the autobiographical Homesick. She won the Nonfiction Award in 1984 for The Double Life of Pocahontas and in 1990 for The Great Little Madison—the second person to win any of the three annual awards twice.) In 1986, she received the Children's Literature Legacy Award from the ALA, which recognizes a living author or illustrator, whose books, published in the United States, have made "a substantial and lasting contribution to literature for children". At the time it was awarded every three years. That year she was also U.S. nominee for the biennial, international Hans Christian Andersen Award, the highest international recognition available to creators of children's books.

== Selected awards ==
New York Times outstanding book of the year citations:

- 1973 – And Then What Happened, Paul Revere?
- 1974 – Why Don't You Get a Horse, Sam Adams?
- 1975 – Where Was Patrick Henry on the 29th of May?
- 1976 – What's the Big Idea, Ben Franklin?
- 1981 – Traitor: The Case of Benedict Arnold
- 1982 – Homesick, My Own Story
- 1983 – Newbery Honor Award, National Book Award, and Boston Globe-Horn Book Honor book, all for Homesick: My Own Story.
- 1989 – Children's Literature Legacy Award, Orbis Pictus Award, National Council of English Teachers, for 1986 The Great Little Madison (1986)

== Works ==
=== Autobiography ===
- Homesick: My Own Story, illustrated with drawings by Margot Tomes and photographs (New York: G.P. Putnam's Sons, 1982); ISBN 0399209336
- China Homecoming, photographs by Michael Fritz (New York: G.P. Putnam's Sons, 1985); ISBN 0399211829
- Surprising Myself, photographs by Andrea Fritz Pfleger (Katonah, New York: R.C. Owen Publishers, 1992); ISBN 1878450379

=== Other ===
- Bunny Hopwell's First Spring (1954)
- Fish Head (1954), illus. Marc Simont
- 121 Pudding Street (1955)
- The Cabin Faced West (1958)
- Champion Dog Prince Tom (1958)
- Brady (1960)
- Magic to Burn (1964)
- Early Thunder (1967)
- George Washington's Breakfast (1969)
- Cast for a Revolution: Some American Friends and Enemies 1728-1814 (1972)
- And Then What Happened, Paul Revere?, illus. Margot Tomes (Coward, 1973)
- Why Don't You Get a Horse, Sam Adams? (1974)
- Will You Sign Here, John Hancock?, illus. Trina Schart Hyman (Coward, 1975)
- Where Was Patrick Henry on the 29th of May? (1975)
- Who's That Stepping on Plymouth Rock? (1975)
- Can't You Make Them Behave, King George? (1976)
- Shh! We're Writing the Constitution (1976)
- Stonewall, illus. Stephen Gammell (Putnam, 1979)
- Brendan the Navigator: the History Mystery about the Discovery of America (1979)
- Where Do You Think You're Going, Christopher Columbus? (1980)
- Traitor: The Case of Benedict Arnold (1981)
- The Double Life of Pocahontas, illus. Ed Young (Putnam, 1983), winner of the Boston Globe–Horn Book Award, Nonfiction
- Make Way for Sam Houston (1986)
- China's Long March: 6,000 Miles of Danger (1988)
- What's the Big Idea, Ben Franklin? (1988)
- The Great Little Madison (Putnam, 1989), winner of the Boston Globe–Horn Book Award, Nonfiction
- Bully for You, Teddy Roosevelt (1990)
- The Big Book for Peace (Dutton, 1990), illus. Teri Sloat
- Surprising Myself (1992)
- The World in 1492 (1992)
- George Washington's Mother (1992)
- Around the World in a Hundred Years (1993)
- Just a Few Words, Mr. Lincoln (1993)
- Harriet Beecher Stowe and The Beecher Preachers (1994)
- You Want Women to Vote, Lizzie Stanton? (1995)
- Why Not Lafayette? (1999)
- Leonardo's Horse (2001)
- The Lost Colony of Roanoke (2004)

== Sources ==
- Frith, Margaret (November 11, 2010). "Who Are You Writing About Today, Jean Fritz?". Publishers Weekly.
