= SS Trent =

British Royal Mail Ship that became a Royal Navy depot ship in the First World War

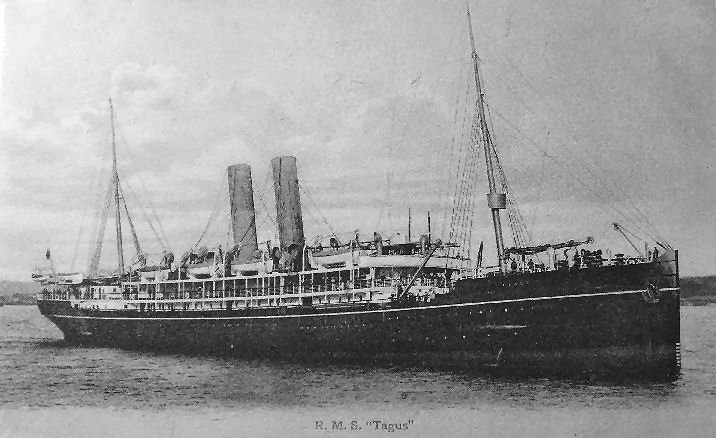
- Trent's sister ship Tagus

History

United Kingdom
- Name: Trent
- Namesake: River Trent
- Owner: RMSP Co
- Operator: 1915: (United Kingdom) Royal Navy
- Port of registry: (United Kingdom) London
- Builder: Robert Napier and Sons, Govan
- Yard number: 467
- Launched: 19 September 1899
- Completed: January 1900
- Identification: UK official number 112664; code letters RMGF; 1913: call sign UNR
- Fate: Scrapped in 1922

General characteristics
- Type: ocean liner
- Tonnage: 5,573 GRT, 3,085 NRT
- Length: 410.0 ft (125.0 m)
- Beam: 50.0 ft (15.2 m)
- Draught: 23.3 ft (7.1 m)
- Depth: 32.3 ft (9.8 m)
- Decks: 3
- Installed power: 1,050 NHP
- Propulsion: 1 × triple expansion engine; 1 × screw
- Speed: 15 knots (28 km/h)
- Sensors & processing systems: submarine signalling
- Notes: sister ship: Tagus

SS Trent was a British steamship that was built in 1899 as an ocean liner for the Royal Mail Steam Packet Company (RMSP) service between England and the Caribbean. In the First World War she was a Royal Navy depot ship. She was scrapped in 1922.

This was the last of three RMSP ships that were named after the English River Trent. RMSP's first Trent was built in 1841 and scrapped in 1867. The second was built as Vasco da Gama in 1873, renamed Trent in 1878 and scrapped in 1897.

== Building ==
In 1899 Robert Napier and Sons in Govan built a pair of sister ships for RMSP. Tagus was launched on 27 June and completed that October. Trent was launched on 19 September 1899 and completed in January 1900. Trent was built as yard number 467. Her registered length was 410.0 ft (125.0 m), her beam was 50.0 ft (15.2 m), her depth was 32.3 ft (9.8 m) and her tonnages were 5,573 GRT and 3,085 NRT.

Trent had a single screw, driven by a three-cylinder triple expansion engine. It was rated at 1,050 NHP and gave her a speed of 15 knots (28 km/h).

Tagus and Trent had a straight stem, counter stern and twin funnels. The two ships looked like RMSP's Nile and Danube of 1893 and 1894, but were slightly smaller, and had two masts instead of Nile and Danube's three.

RMSP registered Trent at London. Her UK official number was 112664 and her code letters were RMGF.

== Civilian liner ==
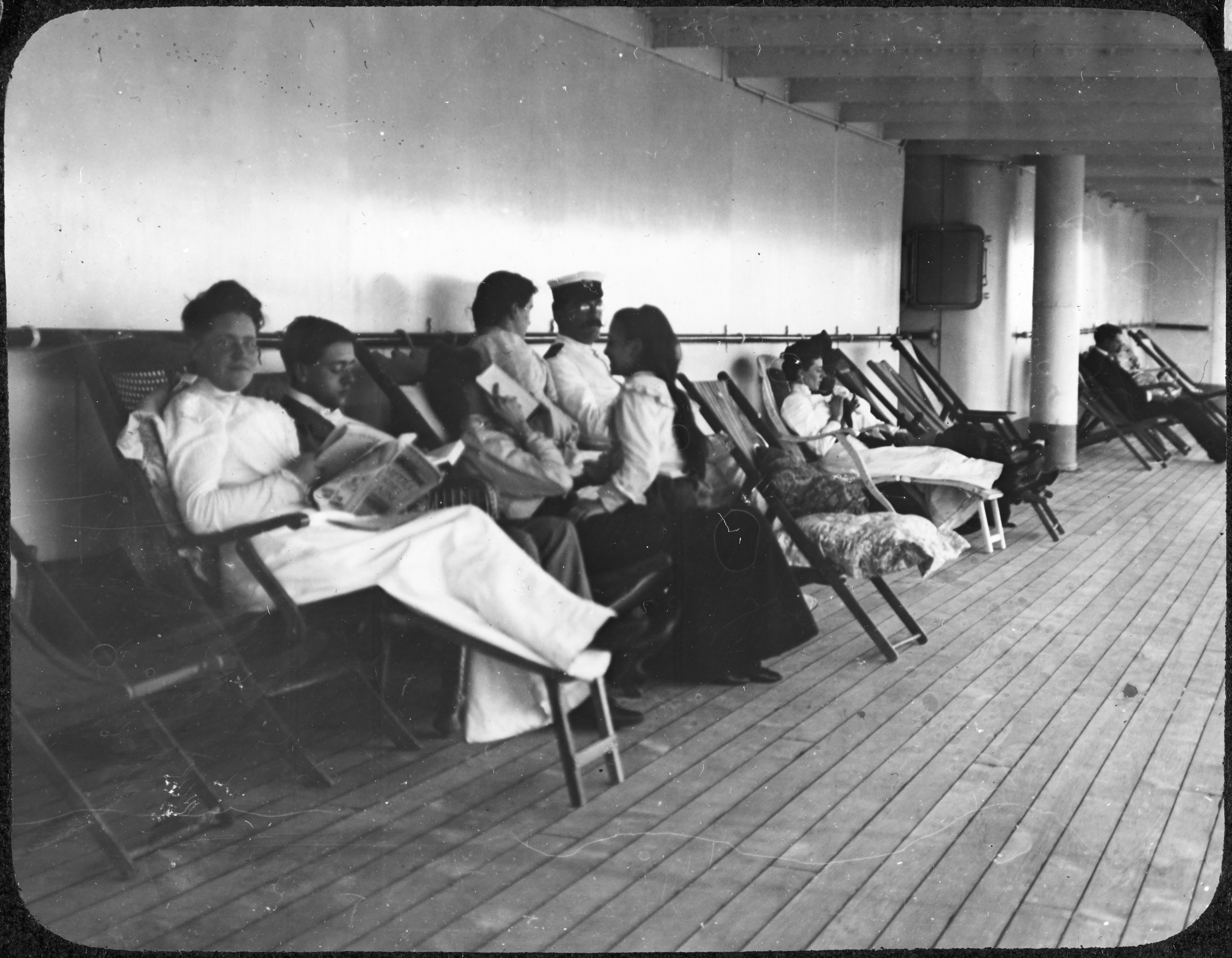
Passengers in deckchairs aboard Trent in 1902

On 6 June 1909 Trent ran aground on Semedine Bank, near Cartagena, Colombia. Magdalena tried to tow her off, but without success. Trent was refloated that May.

By 1910 Trent was equipped for submarine signalling and wireless telegraphy. The Marconi Company supplied and operated her wireless equipment, which had a range of about 160 nautical miles (300 kilometres). By 1913 her wireless call sign was UNR.

== America airship crew rescue ==
In October 1910 Trent rescued the six-man crew of the airship America, including its owner, Walter Wellman. They had been trying to make the first transatlantic crossing by air. America had left Bader Field, New Jersey on 15 October. Changes in wind direction had slowed the airship's progress and blown it off-course, and technical problems had caused it to lose height. At 0507 hrs on the morning of 18 October, America's crew sighted Trent, which was also off her usual course. Trent's usual route had been changed to make a one-off call at Antilla, Cuba. She left Antilla on 14 October, making her two days late to reach her next call at Bermuda. The change in both her course and her schedule was what led Trent to be in the right position at the right time to sight and rescue America's crew.

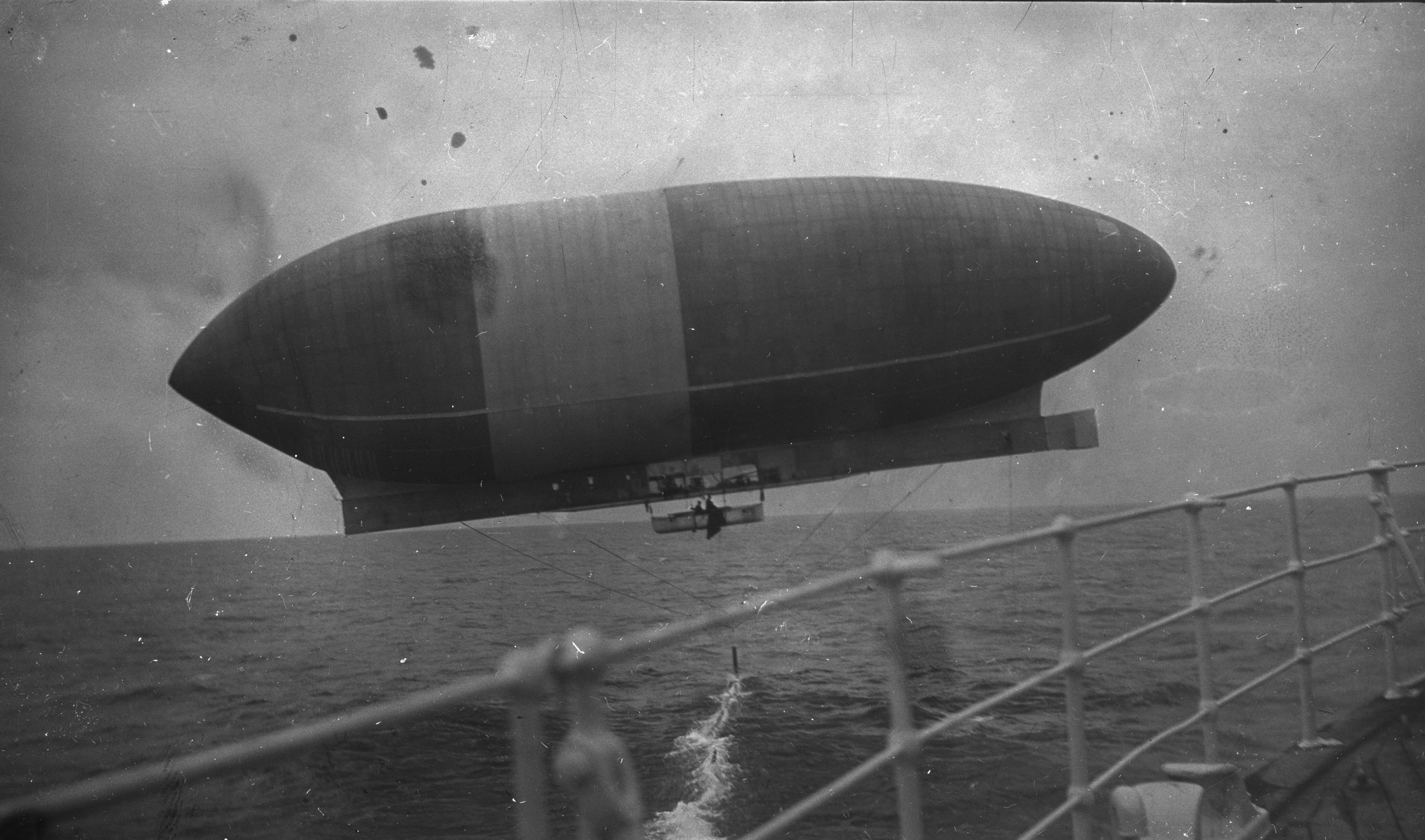
America seen from aboard Trent

America contacted Trent by signal lamp, and requested assistance. The airship crew signalled to the steamship by Morse code, and also by displaying a signal of two red lights one below the other, meaning that America was not under control. Trent changed course to reach America, which was struggling to maintain an altitude of 300 ft (91 m). After establishing contact by signal lamp, America and Trent communicated almost entirely by wireless telegraph. Trent's Master, Captain CE Down, RNR, reported that "The wireless played a wonderful part in the rescue".

America's crew lowered a line for Trent's crew to catch, but gusty conditions repeatedly prevented this. America drifted with the wind at about 12 miles per hour (19 km/h), and Trent followed her for about three hours. Eventually Trent's crew succeeded in catching the line and making it fast to the steamship, but another gust broke it and America was blown away.

The airship crew then reduced America's altitude and launched her lifeboat. The airship struck the lifeboat and nearly capsized it, but the boat righted itself and the airship floated away. The airmen rowed toward Trent, whose crew lowered lines to bring them safely aboard the steamship. Their position was now about 408 miles southeast of Sandy Hook, New Jersey.

== Naval depot ship ==
Aerial view of SMS Königsberg in the Rufiji Delta after her crew scuttled her

On 6 March 1915 the Admiralty requisitioned Trent to serve as a depot ship. She was assigned to support the river monitors HMS Humber, Mersey and Severn in the Gallipoli campaign. Trent transported the monitors' crews to Malta, while the monitors themselves were towed there by tugs. Trent continued to support the monitors, accompanying Mersey and Severn to East Africa in July 1915, for their attack on SMS Königsberg on the Rufiji River.

Trent later returned to home waters, and on 1 October 1917 became the depot ship for HMS Icarus, the Royal Naval Air Service base at Houton Bay, Scapa Flow. Here she supported the Orkney Air Service's anti-submarine patrols until March 1918.

== Disposal ==
The Admiralty returned Trent to her owners on 23 January 1919. She was scrapped at Rotterdam in February 1922.

== Bibliography ==
- Haws, Duncan (1982). Royal Mail & Nelson Lines. Merchant Fleets. Vol. 5. Crowborough: Travel Creatours Ltd Publications. ISBN 0-946378-00-2.
- Lloyd's Register of British and Foreign Shipping. London: Lloyd's Register of Shipping. 1900 – via Internet Archive.
- Lloyd's Register of British and Foreign Shipping. London: Lloyd's Register of Shipping. 1910 – via Internet Archive.
- The Marconi Press Agency Ltd (1913). The Year Book of Wireless Telegraphy and Telephony. London: The St Katherine Press.
- Mercantile Navy List. London. 1902 – via Crew List Index Project.
- Nicol, Stuart (2001a). MacQueen's Legacy; A History of the Royal Mail Line. Vol. One. Brimscombe Port and Charleston, SC: Tempus Publishing. ISBN 0-7524-2118-2.
- Nicol, Stuart (2001b). MacQueen's Legacy; Ships of the Royal Mail Line. Vol. Two. Brimscombe Port and Charleston, SC: Tempus Publishing. ISBN 0-7524-2119-0.
