= Denise Moore =

Aviation pioneer

- Born: Jane Wright; 1876; French Algeria
- Died: 21 July 1911 (aged 34–35); Étampes, France
- Occupation: Pilot
- Known for: Aviation pioneer; first known female aviator to die in flight

Denise Moore (sometimes reported as Deniz Moore), was the pseudonym of Jane Wright (1876 – 21 July 1911), an aviation pioneer. She was the first known female aviator to die in a flight accident.

== Biography ==
Jane Wright is believed to have been of British ancestry and born in Algiers, then in French Algeria. Before coming to metropolitan France in 1911, she lived in Algiers, then a part of France. She was the widow of Denis Cornesson. She flew in France under the name Denise Moore to hide her flying career from her family.

After three weeks of flight training, Wright died on 21 July 1911 in Étampes, France when she fell 150 feet (46 m) from an inverted aircraft, an accident that occurred when she attempted to gain more altitude than had been recommended by her instructor. She was the first woman aviator to die in a plane accident. At the time, she was learning to fly at the Henry Farman Aviation School.

== See also ==
- List of firsts in aviation
