= List of firsts in aviation =

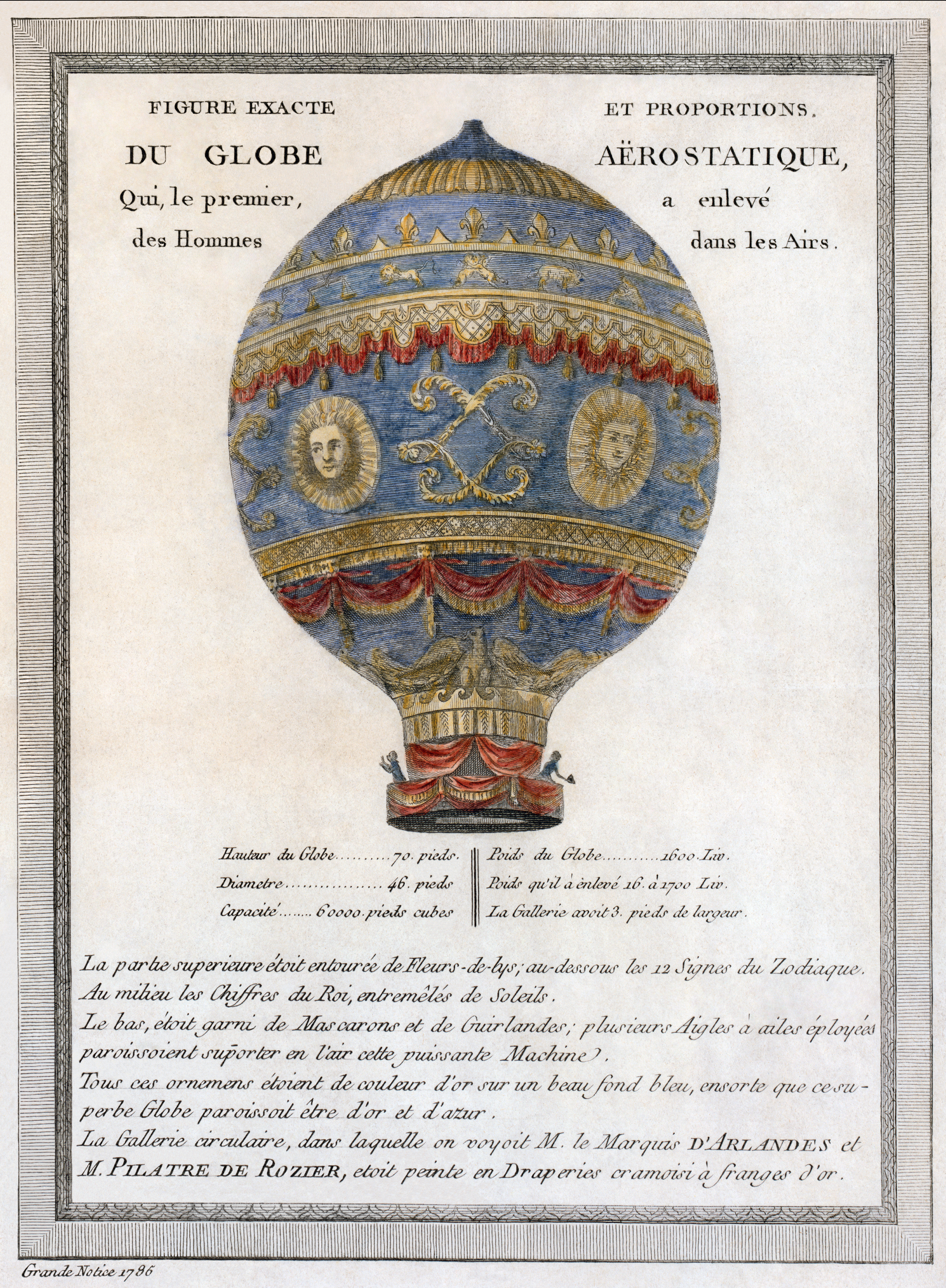
Period drawing of Montgolfier hot air balloon that made the first confirmed flight by man in 1783

This is a list of firsts in aviation. For a comprehensive list of women's records, see Women in aviation.

== First person to fly ==
The first flight (including gliding) by a person is unknown. A number have been suggested:

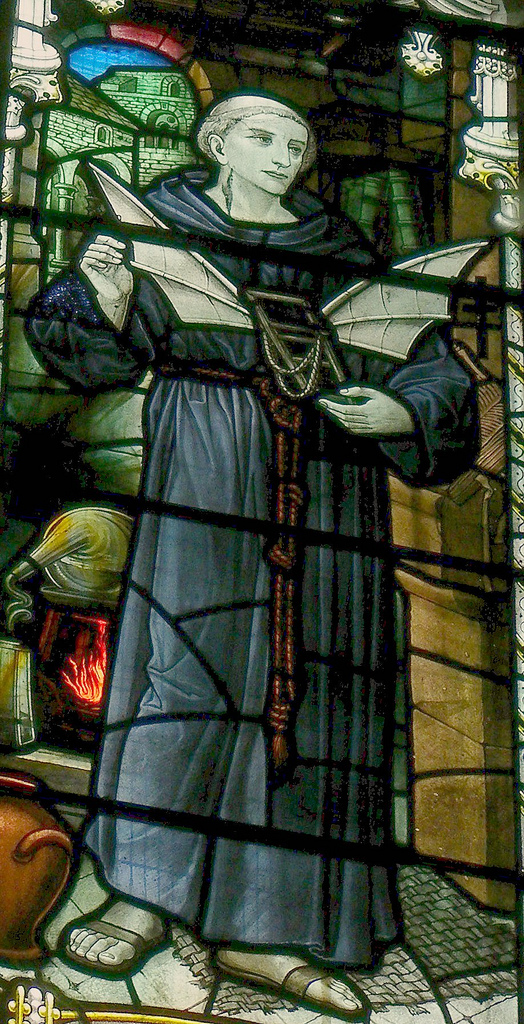
1920 Stained glass window of the monk Eilmer of Malmesbury holding his wings (early 11th century)

- In 559 A.D., several prisoners of Emperor Wenxuan of Northern Qi, including Yuan Huangtou of Ye, were said to have been forced to launch themselves with a kite from a tower, as an experiment. Only Yuan Huangtou survived, only to be executed later.
- In the 9th century, the Andalusian Abbas ibn Firnas attempted a short gliding flight with wings covered with feathers from the Tower of Cordoba but was injured while landing.
- In the early 11th century, Eilmer of Malmesbury, an English Benedictine monk, attempted a gliding flight using wings. He is recorded as travelling for more than a furlong [201 metres] before breaking his legs on landing.
- According to some accounts, during the Chinese Ming dynasty (1368 to 1644), Wan Hu is said to have attempted to fly unsuccessfully, by means of forty-seven rockets and two kites attached to a chair.
- In c. 1509, the Italian alchemist and abbot of Tongland, John Damian, is said to have made an attempt at human-powered flight off the walls of Stirling Castle in the Kingdom of Scotland, if a satirical account in two poems by the poet William Dunbar is based on facts.
- Between 1630 and 1632, Hezarfen Ahmed Çelebi is said to have glided over the Bosphorus strait from the Galata Tower to the Üsküdar district in Istanbul.
- In 1633 his brother Lagari Hasan Çelebi may have survived a flight on a 7-winged rocket powered by gunpowder from Sarayburnu, the point below Topkapı Palace in Istanbul.

None of these historical accounts are adequately supported by corroborating evidence nor have any been widely accepted. The first confirmed human flight was accomplished by Jean-François Pilâtre de Rozier in a tethered Montgolfier balloon in 1783.

== Lighter than air (aerostats) ==
- First animals to fly in a balloon: A sheep called Montauciel, along with a duck and a rooster were sent on a balloon flight by the Montgolfier brothers on September 19, 1783.
- First manned flight: Étienne Montgolfier went aloft in a tethered Montgolfier hot air balloon on October 15, 1783.
- First manned free flight in an untethered balloon: Jean-François Pilâtre de Rozier and Marquis d'Arlandes flew in a Montgolfier hot air balloon from the Château de la Muette to the Butte-aux-Cailles, Paris, on November 21, 1783.
- First manned gas balloon flight: Professor Jacques Charles and Nicolas-Louis Robert flew from Paris to Nesles-la-Vallée in a hydrogen-filled balloon on December 1, 1783.
- First women to fly: The Marchioness and Countess of Montalembert, the Countess of Podenas, and Miss de Lagarde ascended in a tethered balloon over Paris, on May 20, 1784.
- First woman in free flight in an untethered balloon: Élisabeth Thible flew over Lyon singing arias on June 4, 1784, in order to entertain Gustav III of Sweden.
- First flight in a steerable balloon (or airship): On July 15, 1784, the Robert brothers (Les Frères Robert) flew for 45 minutes from Saint-Cloud to Meudon with M. Collin-Hullin and Louis Philippe II, the Duke of Chartres, in an elongated balloon designed by Jacques Charles, following Jean Baptiste Meusnier's suggestions (1783–85), but the oars did not work.
- First primitive airmail: John Jeffries dropped four letters from a balloon over London on November 30, 1784.
- First flight across the English Channel: Was made by Jean-Pierre Blanchard and John Jeffries in a balloon on January 7, 1785.
- First aviation disaster: Occurred in Tullamore, County Offaly, Ireland, when a hot air balloon caused a fire that burned down about 100 houses on May 10, 1785.
- First known fatalities in an air crash: Jean-François Pilâtre de Rozier and Pierre Romain died when their Rozière balloon deflated and crashed near Wimereux in Pas-de-Calais, on June 15, 1785.
- First blood chit equivalent carried by an airman: By Jean-Pierre Blanchard (who did not speak English) on the first balloon flight in America, on January 9, 1793.
- First jump from a balloon with a parachute (claimed): Jean-Pierre Blanchard claimed to have used a parachute in 1793 to escape his hot air balloon when it ruptured, but there were no witnesses.
- First jump from a balloon with a parachute (observed): Andre Jacques Garnerin in Paris in 1797.
- First balloon ascent on horseback. Pierre Testu-Brissy ascended from Belleville Park in Paris.
- First woman to jump from a balloon with a parachute: Jeanne Geneviève Labrosse jumped from an altitude of 3,000 ft (900 m) on October 12, 1799.
- First woman to pilot her own balloon: Sophie Blanchard flew solo from the garden of the Cloister of the Jacobins in Toulouse on August 18, 1805.
- First woman to be killed in an aviation accident: Sophie Blanchard was killed when her hydrogen balloon ignited on July 6, 1819.

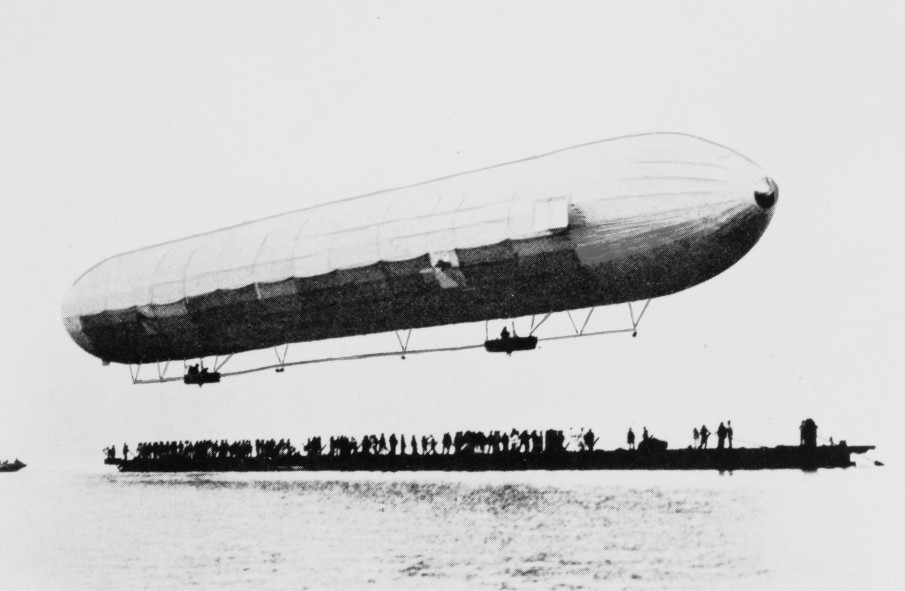
Zeppelin LZ 1, first rigid airship to fly, 1900

- First successful steerable powered balloon: The Giffard dirigible was developed and flown by Henri Giffard, from the Paris Hippodrome to Trappes on September 24, 1852.
- First balloon mail service: Passed vital information over Prussian lines during the 1870–71 Siege of Paris.
- First flight in an airship powered by an internal combustion engine: Was made by Alberto Santos Dumont in 1898.
- First flight of a rigid airship: Was made by the Zeppelin LZ 1 from Lake Constance (the Bodensee) on July 2, 1900.
- First woman to pilot a powered aircraft: Rose Isabel Spencer, in Stanley Spencer's Airship Number 1, at Crystal Palace, London on July 14, 1902.
- First trans-Atlantic rigid airship flight: Was made by the R34 from RAF East Fortune to Mineola, New York from July 2 to July 6, 1919. This flight carried the first trans-Atlantic stowaways: William Ballantyne and his tabby cat, Wopsie. Wopsie and two homing pigeons were the first animals to cross the Atlantic in an aircraft, with Wopsie being the first quadruped known to have flown across a major body of water.
- First helium-filled rigid airship to fly: Was the USS Shenandoah on August 20, 1923, although it did not make a powered flight until September 24, 1923.

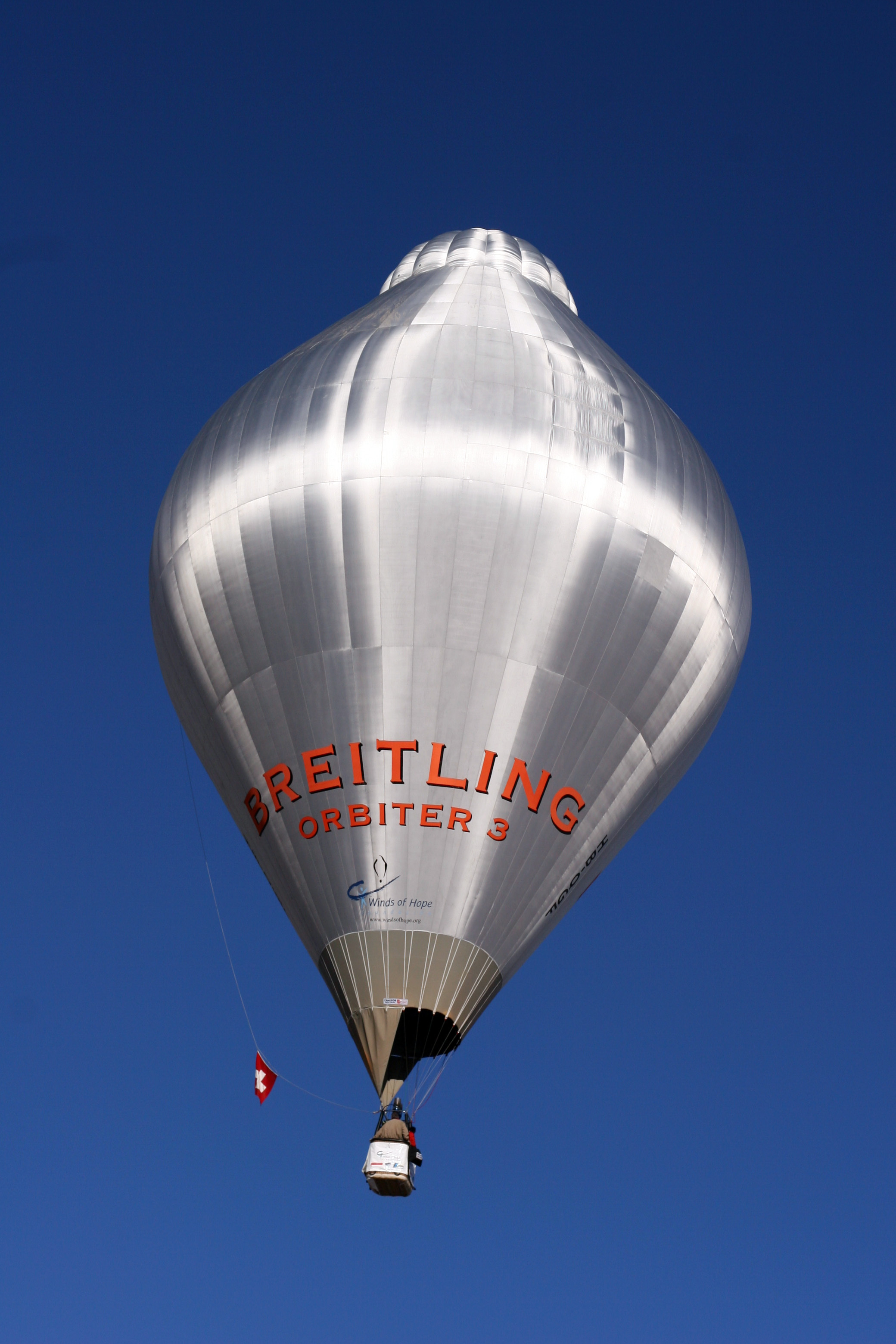
The Breitling Orbiter 3 in which the first non-stop balloon circumnavigation was achieved in 1999

- First people to reach the stratosphere: Were Auguste Piccard and Paul Kipfer, who ascended to the height of 51,000 ft (15,500 m) in a hydrogen balloon on May 27, 1931.
- First crossing of the Atlantic by balloon: Was made by Ben Abruzzo, Maxie Anderson, and Larry Newman in the helium-filled Double Eagle II, on August 17, 1978.
- First non-stop balloon crossing of North America: Maxie and Kris Anderson in the helium-filled Kitty Hawk, on May 12, 1980.
- First trans-Pacific crossing by balloon: Ben Abruzzo, Larry Newman, Ron Clark and Rocky Aoki, in gas-filled Double Eagle V, in November 1981.
- First balloon flight on another planet: Was conducted by the Soviet Vega 1 Balloon in the skies above Venus between June 11, 1985, and June 13, 1985. This was the first flight of any man-made object in another planet's atmosphere.
- First non-stop balloon circumnavigation of the Earth: Was made by Bertrand Piccard and Brian Jones who flew from Château d'Oex, Switzerland, to Egypt, on Breitling Orbiter 3, between March 1 and March 21, 1999, in 19 days, 21 hours and 47 minutes.
- First solo non-stop balloon flight around the Earth: Steve Fossett, in the Spirit of Freedom, circumnavigated the globe between June 19 and July 3, 2002.

== Heavier than air (aerodynes) ==
=== Pioneer era 1853–1914 ===
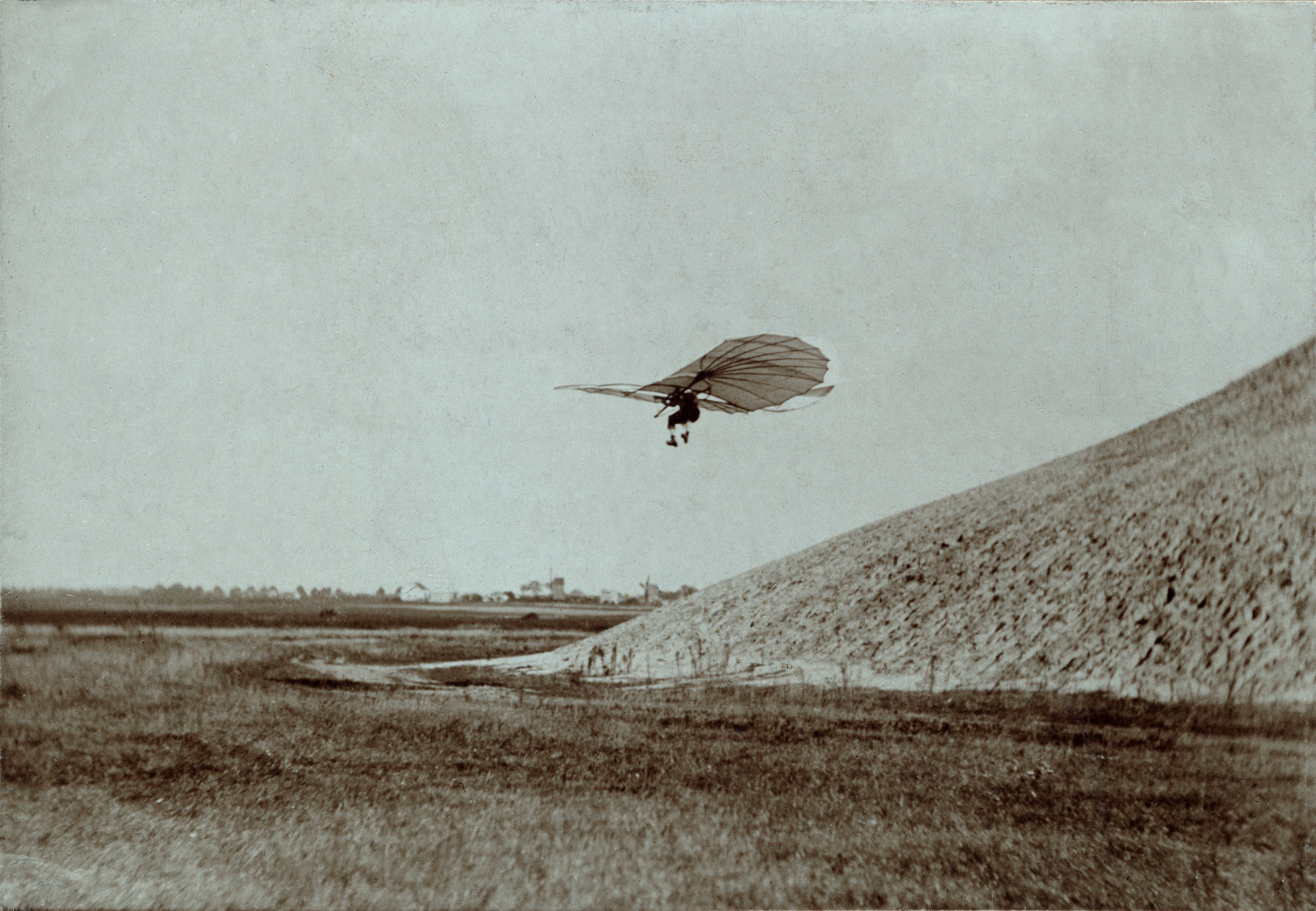
Otto Lilienthal in mid-flight, c. 1895

- First manned glider flight: Was made by an unidentified boy in an uncontrolled glider launched by George Cayley in 1853.
- First confirmed manned powered flight: Was made by Clément Ader in an uncontrolled monoplane of his own design, in 1890.
- First controlled manned glider flight: Was made by Otto Lilienthal in a glider of his own design, in 1891.

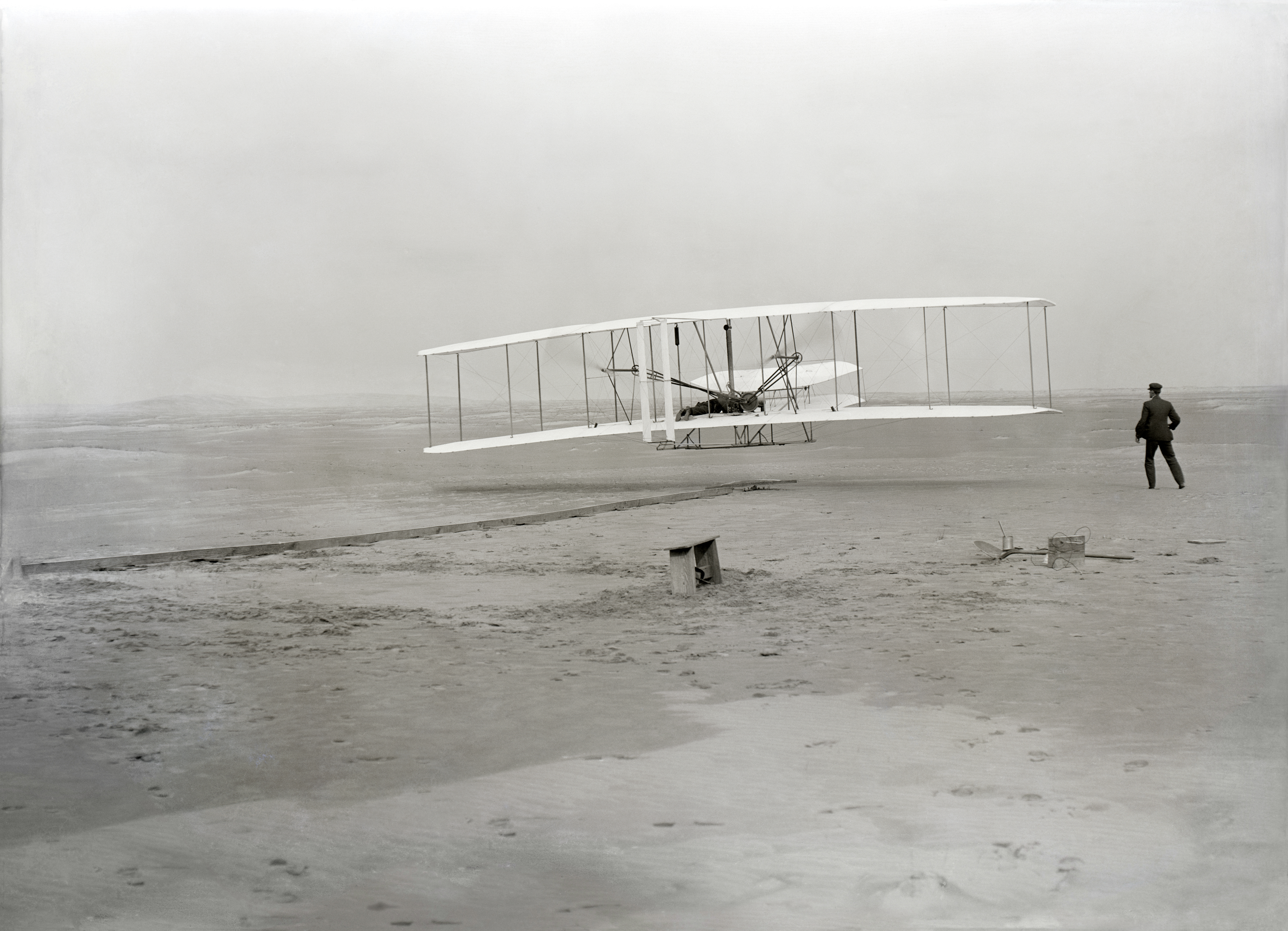
The Wright brothers' Wright Flyer making the first controlled, sustained flight of a powered airplane in 1903. Orville piloting while Wilbur observes

- First controlled, sustained flight in a powered airplane: Was made by Orville Wright in the Wright Flyer on December 17, 1903, covering 37 m (120 ft).
- First circular flight by a powered airplane: Was made by Wilbur Wright who flew 1,240 m (4,080 ft) in about a minute and a half on September 20, 1904.
- First aircraft to fly using ailerons for lateral control: Was Robert Esnault-Pelterie's October 1904 glider, although ailerons were only named that in 1908 by Henry Farman.
- First flight of an aircraft with pneumatic tires: Was Traian Vuia's March 18, 1906 flight with his Vuia 1, travelling at a height of about 3 1/3 ft (1 m) for about 12 m (39 ft).
- First heavier-than-air unaided takeoff and flight of more than 25 m (82 ft) in Europe: Was made by Alberto Santos-Dumont, flew a distance of 60 m (200 ft) in his 14-bis to win the Archdeacon Prize on October 23, 1906.
- First flight certified by Fédération Aéronautique Internationale (FAI): Was made by Alberto Santos Dumont, when he flew his 14-bis, without liftoff aid, over a distance of 220 m (720 ft) in the presence of official observers from the newly founded FAI on November 12, 1906.
- First airplane passenger: Was Léon Delagrange, with pilot Henri Farman, on March 29, 1908.
- First use of the modern aircraft flight control system: Was in the Blériot VIII, which took to the air with Robert Esnault-Pelterie's control layout, using a joystick for pitch and roll control, and a foot-bar for lateral control, in April 1908.
- First person to die in a crash of a powered airplane: Was Thomas Etholen Selfridge, a passenger on an aircraft flown by Orville Wright which crashed on September 17, 1908. Wright was badly injured, and was hospitalised for seven weeks.
- First return flight between two towns: Was made by Louis Blériot, who flew from Toury to Artenay, and back on October 30, 1908, for a total distance of 12 nmi (14 mi; 22 km).
- First official pilot's licence: Was licence number 1, which was issued to Louis Blériot by the Aéro Club de France on January 7, 1909.

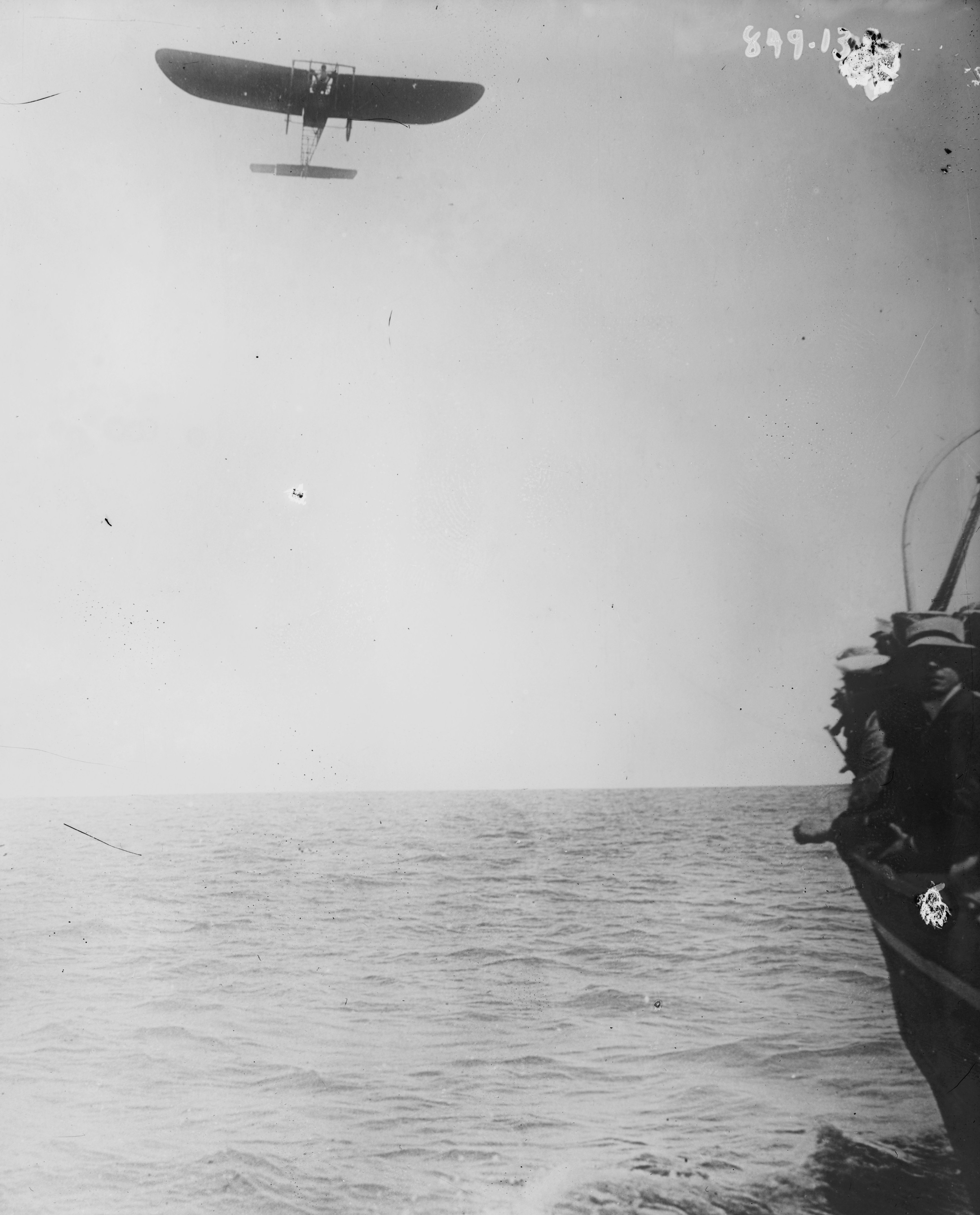
Louis Blériot crossing the English Channel, 1909

- First aircraft to fly with a rotary engine: Was a Farman III biplane, in April 1909.
- First ditching of an airplane: Was made by Hubert Latham, while attempting to complete the first powered flight across the English Channel in an Antoinette IV monoplane, but experienced an engine failure on July 19, 1909.
- First airplane flight across the English Channel: Was completed by Louis Blériot in a Blériot XI on July 25, 1909, to win a £1,000 Daily Mail prize.
- First animal to fly on an airplane: Happened when John Moore-Brabazon, in the Short Biplane No. 2 (not a Voisin as sometimes reported) took a pig later named Icarus II aloft on November 4, 1909, as a joke to prove the adage that pigs could fly.
- First flight in Latin America: Was made by Dimitri Sensaud de Lavaud in a São Paulo Airplane, constructed with help of his assistant Lourenço Pellegatti, when he flew a distance of 105 m (344 ft) in Osasco, Brazil, on January 7, 1910.
- First flight in complete darkness: Was made by Henry Farman in a Farman biplane without the benefit of moonlight, on March 1, 1910.
- First woman to earn a pilot license: Was Raymonde de Laroche, on March 8, 1910.
- First flight in Asia: Was made by Giacomo D'Angelis, in a biplane built by D'Angelis entirely from his own designs, experimenting with a small horse-power engine, on March 29, 1910, in Chennai, India (formerly known as Madras).
- First documented and witnessed seaplane flight under power from water's surface: Was made by Henri Fabre, in the Fabre Hydravion Le Canard (the duck), on March 28, 1910.
- First aircraft flight simulator: Was built by aircraft manufacturer Antoinette to teach pupils to fly their monoplanes on May 7, 1910.
- First Chief of State to fly on an airplane: Was Ferdinand I of Bulgaria, as a passenger in a Farman III biplane flown by Jules de Laminne during a visit in Belgium on July 15, 1910.
- First airborne radio communications: Were made by Frederick Walker Baldwin and Douglas McCurdy with a morse radio message from a Curtiss biplane while in flight, which was received by a nearby ground station on August 27, 1910. They were also responsible for the first radio message received by an aircraft in flight, on March 6, 1911.

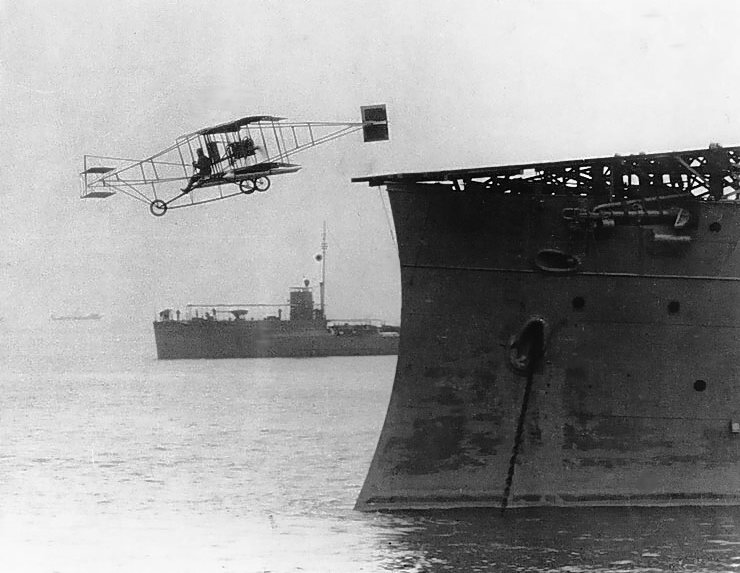
Eugene Burton Ely making the first shipboard takeoff from the USS Birmingham in 1910

- First flight across the Pennine Alps: Was made by Peruvian aviator Jorge Chávez in a Blériot XI on 23 September 1910, from Ried-Brig to Domodossola, during which he reached an altitude of 6,600 ft (2,000 m).
- First mid-air collision between two airplanes: Happened when an Antoinette IV, flown by René Thomas, rammed Bertram Dickson's Farman III biplane on October 1, 1910. Both initially survived, but Dickson's injuries contributed to his death in 1913.
- First flight by a former US president: Was made by 26th US president Theodore Roosevelt in Wright brothers-designed aircraft from Kinloch Airfield, St. Louis, Missouri, on October 11, 1910.
- First shipboard take-off and landing by an airplane: Was made by Eugene Burton Ely, in a Curtiss Model D pusher, from a temporary platform aboard light cruiser USS Birmingham on November 14, 1910. Ely was also the first to land an airplane on a ship, touching down on a temporary platform aboard armored cruiser USS Pennsylvania on January 11, 1911.
- The first non-stop flight from London to Paris: Was made by Pierre Prier in a Blériot XI on April 12, 1911, in 3 hours and 56 minutes.
- First woman to die in a crash of a powered airplane: Was Denise Moore, who fell from a Farman III, on July 21, 1911.
- First known spin recovery: Was made by F. P. Raynham in an Avro Type D biplane on September 21, 1911.
- First flight across the Continental Divide of the Americas (the Rocky Mountains): Was made by Cromwell Dixon in a Curtiss pusher on September 30, 1911, reaching an altitude of 7,100 ft (2,200 m).

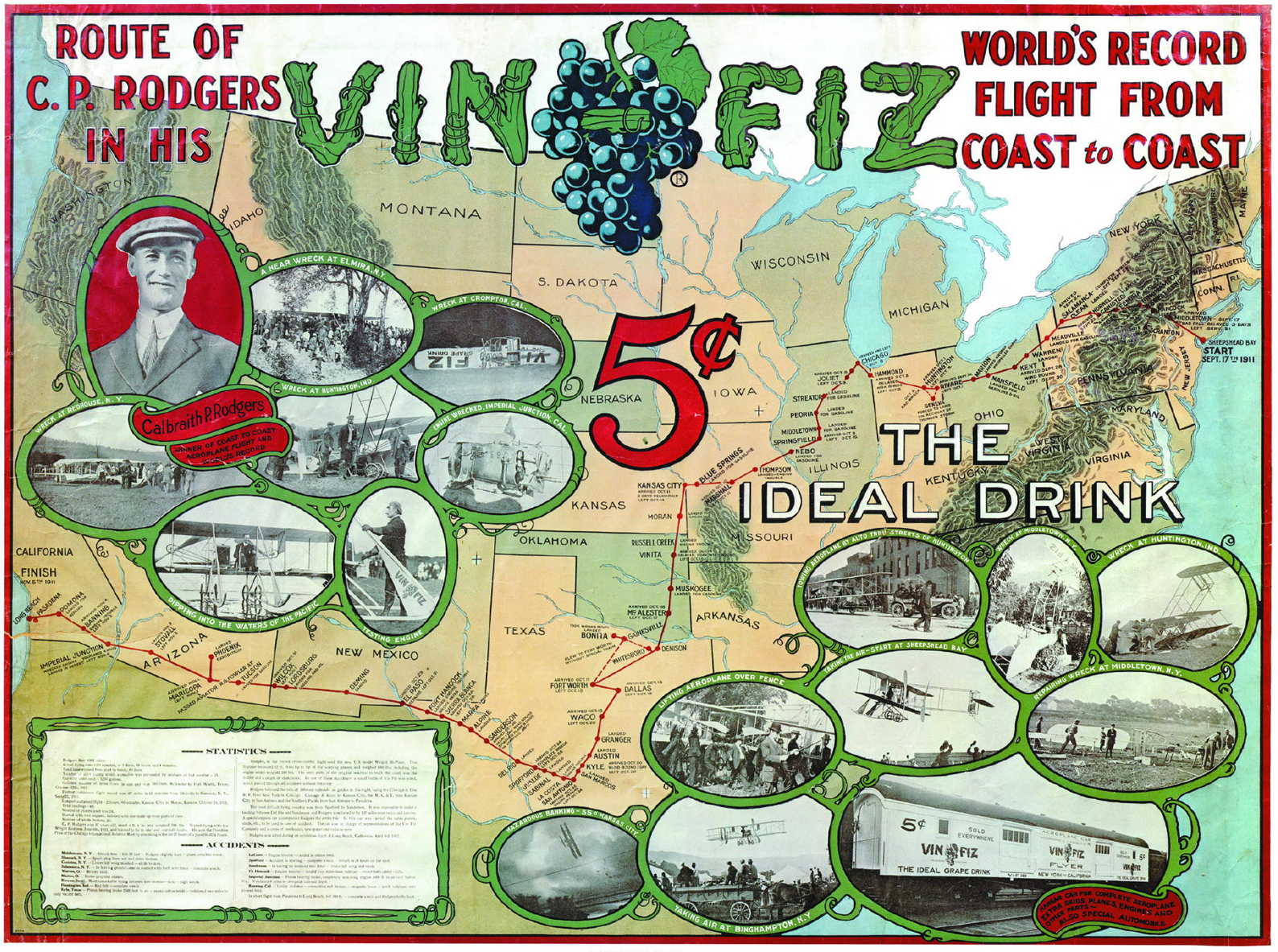
Armour Company poster showing Calbraith Perry Rodgers's Vin Fiz Flyer transcontinental flight route, 1911

- First ordnance dropped from an airplane: Lieutenant Giulio Gavotti dropped grenades from his Etrich Taube airplane on Ottoman troops in Libya on November 1, 1911.
- First transcontinental flight across North America: Calbraith Perry Rodgers flew the Vin Fiz Wright Model EX biplane through a seventy-plus-stop trek across the United States from Sheepshead Bay, New York to Long Beach, California from September 17 to December 10, 1911.
- First parachute jump from an airplane: Was made by Grant Morton from a Wright Model B over Venice, California, in 1911. However credit is generally given to Albert Berry, who jumped from a Benoist biplane over Jefferson Barracks, Missouri, on March 1, 1912.
- First night mission: Was made by Lieutenant Giulio Gavotti during the campaign against the Ottoman Empire on March 4, 1912.
- First woman to fly across the English Channel: Was Harriet Quimby, who flew from Dover to Hardelot-Plage on April 16, 1912.
- First airplane flight across the Irish Sea: Was made by Denys Corbett Wilson took 100 minutes to fly a Blériot XI from Goodwick in Wales to Enniscorthy in Ireland, on April 22, 1912.
- First take-off by an airplane from a moving ship: Commander Charles R. Samson took off from a platform aboard the battleship HMS Hibernia in a Short Improved S.27 No. 38, on May 9, 1912.
- First flight of an all-metal aircraft: The Reissner Canard, designed by Professor Hans Reissner (with engineering help from Hugo Junkers), whose structure and skin were both all metal, was first flown on May 23, 1912, by Robert Gsell.
- First national identification markings used on aircraft: Was in France following instructions from the Inspection Permante de l'Aeronautique to paint roundels with an outer diameter of 1 m (3.3 ft) in red, with a white ring of 70 cm (28 in) and an inner blue dot of 40 cm (16 in) on July 26, 1912. Proportions and diameter would later be adjusted. Both Germany and the UK issued orders for national markings only when they mobilized in 1914, for the First World War.
- First observed spin recovery: Was made by Wilfred Parke in an Avro Type G on August 25, 1912.
- First aircraft to be captured: Was that of Captain Moizo of the Italian Servizio Aeronautico, on September 10, 1912, during the Italo-Turkish War, but sources disagree on whether he was shot down, or had mechanical problems.

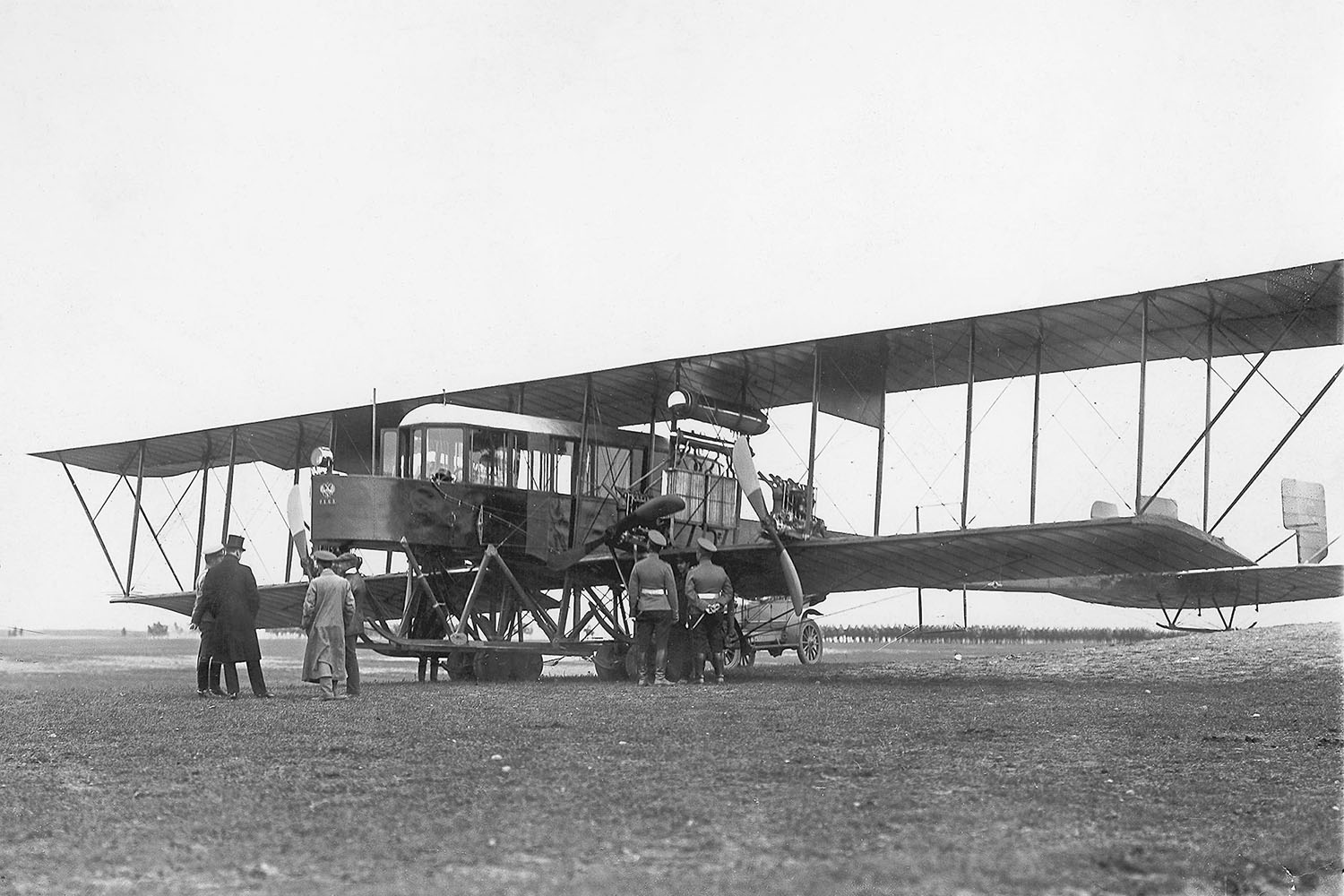
First four-engine aircraft to fly, the Sikorsky Bolshoi Baltiskiy, after two of the engines had been moved out on the wings, 1910

- First non-stop transcontinental flight: Robert G. Fowler and Ray Duhem flew from the Pacific to the Atlantic along the route of the Panama Canal in a single-engine hydroplane in one hour and 45 minutes, on April 27, 1913.
- First use of a flight data recorder: Invented by George M. Dyott and used in the 1913 Dyott monoplane. It used three pointers to record movements of the control surfaces on a strip of paper run between two rollers.
- First four-engine aircraft to fly: The Russian Russo-Baltic Wagon Works Большой Балтийский (Bolshoi Baltiskiy – Great Baltic), developed by Igor Sikorsky; took to the air on May 10, 1913, after having two additional engines installed in pusher configuration, in tandem behind the pair of installed engines; when the original pair were found to leave it underpowered.
- First bombing attack against a surface ship: Didier Masson and Captain Joaquín Bauche Alcalde dropped dynamite bombs on Federalist gunboats at Guaymas, Mexico, on May 10, 1913, while flying for Mexican Revolutionist Venustiano Carranza.
- First propaganda leaflet flight: Didier Masson distributed propaganda leaflets from the air for the Mexican Revolutionist Venustiano Carranza, post May 10, 1913.

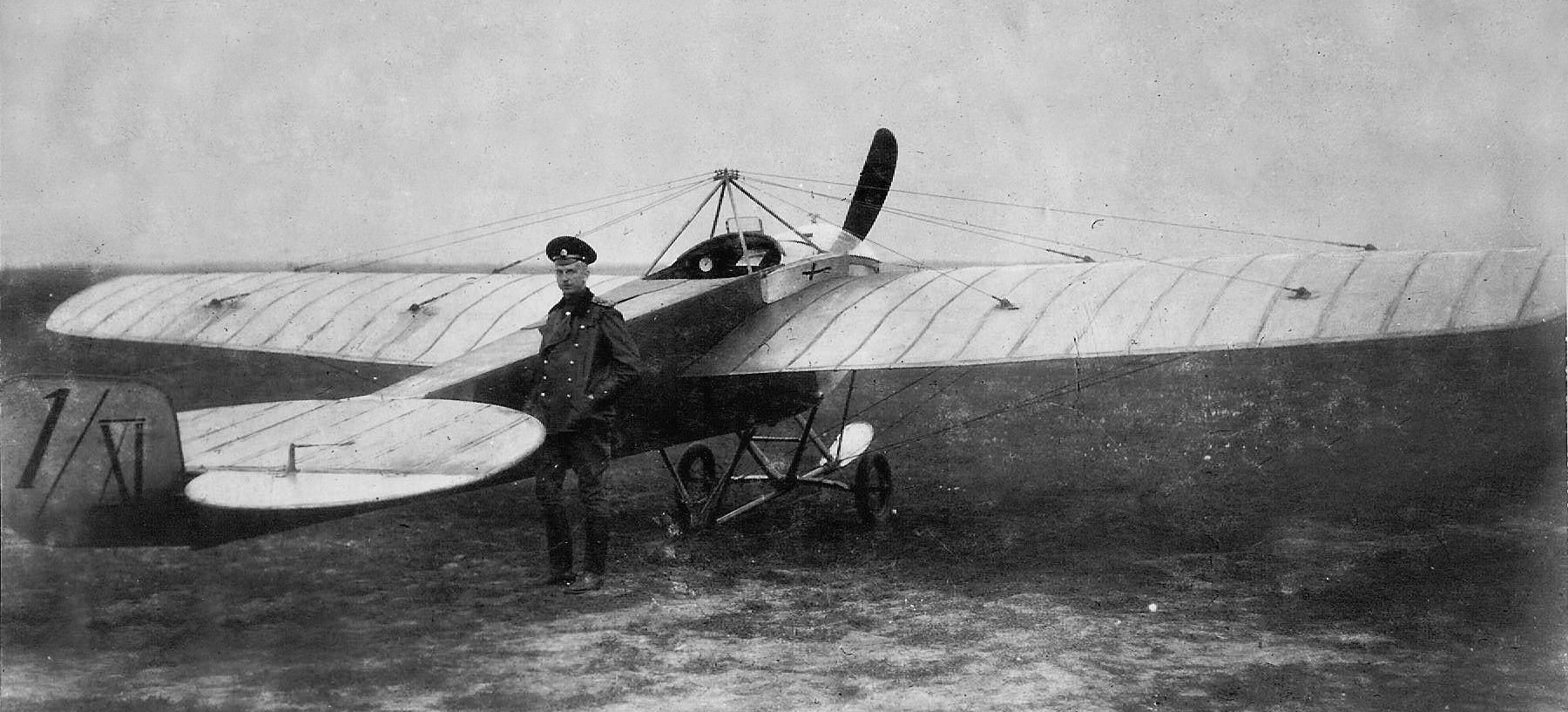
Pyotr Nesterov with the Nieuport IV.G he looped in 1913

- First flight across the Alps: Was made by Swiss aviator Oskar Bider in a Blériot XI on 13 July, 1913, from Bern to Domodossola and Milan during which he reached an altitude of 11,500 ft (3,500 m).
- First loop: Pyotr Nesterov looped a Nieuport IV, on September 9, 1913.
- First flight across the Mediterranean: Roland Garros flew a Morane-Saulnier G from the South of France to Tunisia, on September 23, 1913.
- First aircraft to exceed 100 mph (87 kn; 160 km/h) in level flight: Maurice Prévost flew a Deperdussin Monocoque in the 1913 Gordon Bennett Trophy race averaging over 100 mph during a lap on September 28, 1913.
- First dogfight: Dean Ivan Lamb flying a Curtiss pusher and Phil Rader in a Christofferson biplane traded pistol shots while airborne, over Naco during the Mexican revolution, November or December 1913.
- First scheduled commercial airplane flight: Tony Jannus flew a Benoist XIV biplane flying-boat of the St. Petersburg-Tampa Airboat Line from St. Petersburg to Tampa in 23 minutes on January 1, 1914, with a paying passenger. This service ran until May 5, 1914.
- First piloted flight indoors: Lincoln Beachey flew inside the Palace of Machinery intended for the Panama-Pacific International Exposition, in San Francisco, California on either February 16 or 17, 1914.
- First flight across the North Sea: On July 30, 1914, Tryggve Gran flew the 280 nmi (320 mi; 520 km) from Cruden Bay in Scotland to Jæren in Norway in 4 hours and 10 minutes, using a Blériot XI aircraft.

=== Practical flight 1914–1938 ===
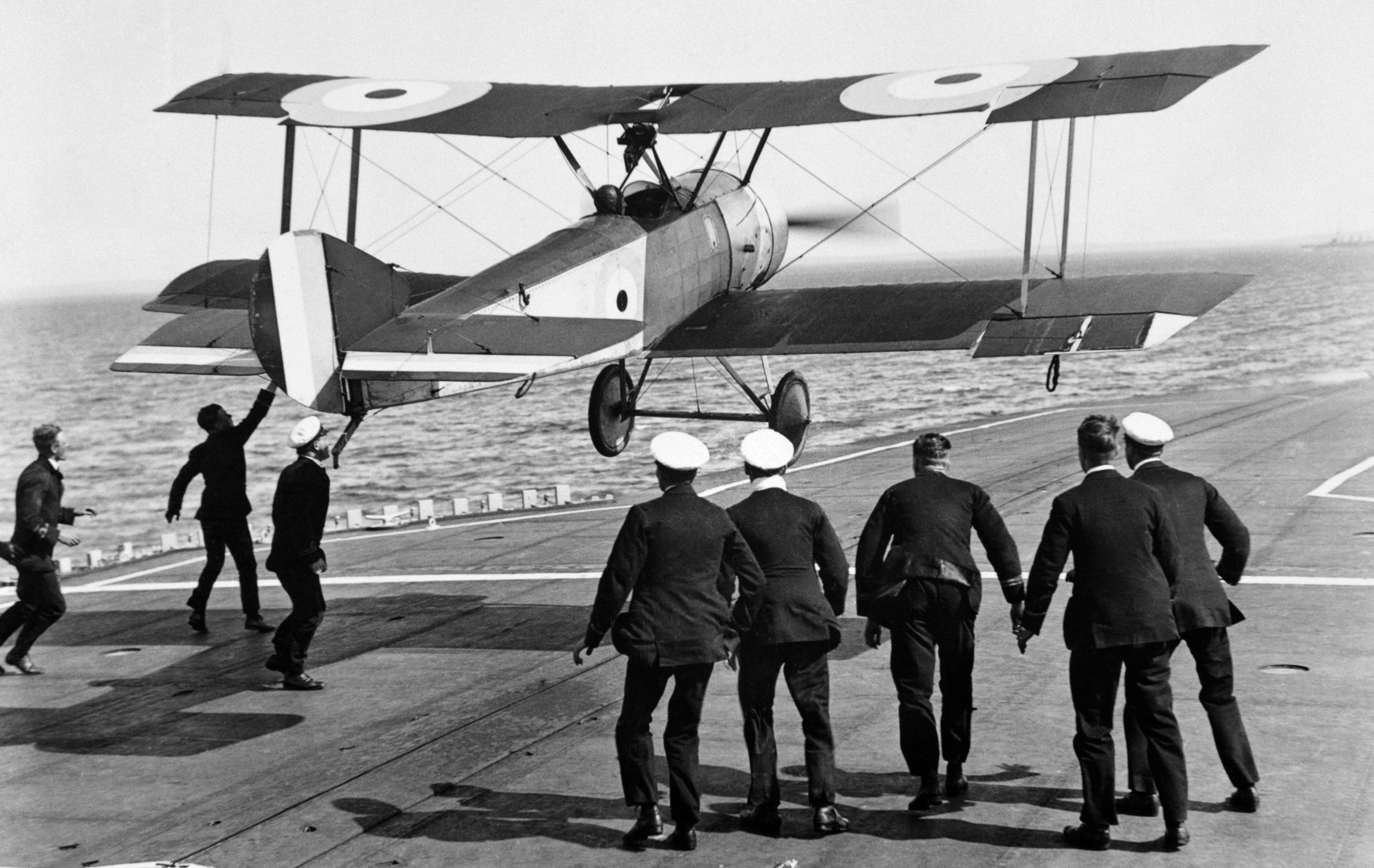
Edwin Dunning landing a Sopwith Pup on HMS Furious in 1917

- First aircraft downed by ground fire: On August 20, 1914, during the Battle of Cer, an Austro-Hungarian Lohner B.I of Fliegerkompagnie 13 was damaged by Royal Serbian Army small arms fire near Lešnica. The pilot escaped and the Serbs failed to repair his aircraft.
- First aircraft intentionally downed by another aircraft: On September 7, 1914, during the Battle of Galicia, Pyotr Nesterov rammed his Morane-Saulnier G into an Austrian Albatros B.II reconnaissance aircraft of FLIK 11 (manned by pilot Franz Malina and observer Friedrich von Rosenthal) following previous attempts using a grappling hook. Both aircraft were destroyed and all died of their injuries the next day.
- First aircraft to shoot down another aircraft: In an aerial combat of 5 October 1914 near Rheims, a French Voisin III (pilot Sergeant Joseph Frantz, gunner Corporal Louis Quenault) engaged a German Aviatik B.II (pilot Sergeant Wilhelm Schlichting, observer Lieutenant Fritz von Zangen). After expending the ammunition for his Hotchkiss Mle 1914 machine gun, Quénault shot Schlichting with his rifle, causing the Aviatik to crash.
- First female military pilot: Eugenie Mikhailovna Shakhovskaya was a reconnaissance pilot in the Imperial Russian Air Service, having been ordered to active service on November 19, 1914.
- First aircraft operated from a submarine: Was a Friedrichshafen FF.29 floatplane flown by Friedrich von Arnauld de la Perière from the U-boat SM U-12 (Germany) on January 6, 1915, when the aircraft was unlashed from the U-boat, which submerged out from under it.
- First aerial victory for a fighter aircraft armed with a fixed forward-firing machine gun: Roland Garros, while with Escadrille 23 of the Aéronautique Militaire worked with Raymond Saulnier on a synchronized machine gun, however when that failed, they attached steel wedges to the propeller blades, and he proceeded to down three German aircraft in March 1915 before his engine failed behind enemy lines.

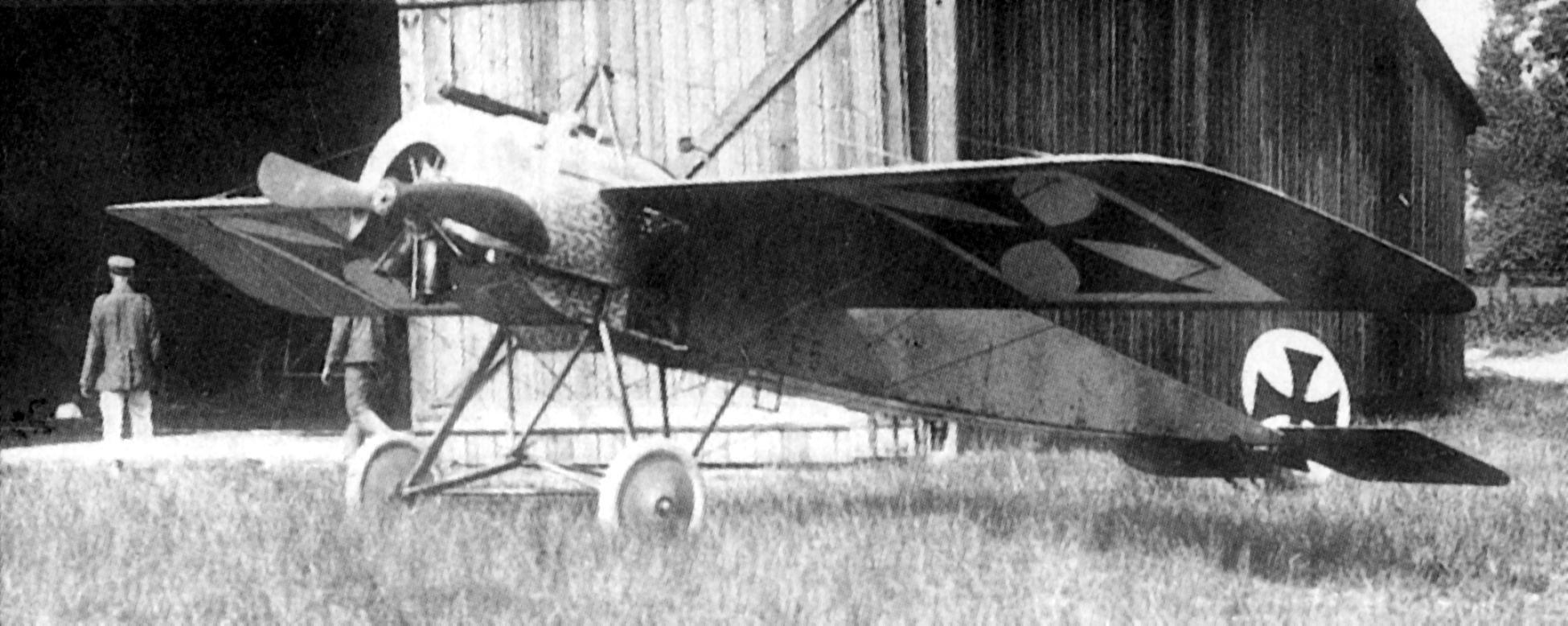
Kurt Wintgens' Fokker M.5K/MG used on July 1, 1915

- First airship downed by another aircraft: On June 8, 1915, an Italian marine airship M.2 Città di Ferrara was shot down by a flare by the Austro-Hungarian L 48 seaplane piloted by Gustav Klasing.
- First aerial victory for a fighter aircraft armed with a forward-firing synchronized machine gun: Leutnant Kurt Wintgens of Feldflieger Abteilung 6b of the German Army's Fliegertruppe air arm, flying a Fokker M.5K/MG Eindecker, downed a French Morane-Saulnier L near Lunéville, France, on July 1, 1915.
- First female combat fighter pilot: Marie Marvingt flew combat missions for France in 1915.
- First sinking of a ship with an aerial torpedo: Charles Edmonds in a Short 184 torpedoed and sank an abandoned Turkish supply ship in the Sea of Marmara on August 12, 1915.
- First downing of a military aircraft with ground artillery fire: Serbian Army private Radoje Ljutovac hit an Austro-Hungarian aircraft on September 30, 1915, during a bombing raid on Kragujevac.
- First combat search and rescue by airplane: Richard Bell Davies landed his Nieuport 10 to rescue another pilot who had been shot down in Bulgaria on November 19, 1915.
- First medical evacuation (medevac) by air: Louis Paulhan evacuated the seriously ill Milan Štefánik from the Serbian front in 1915.

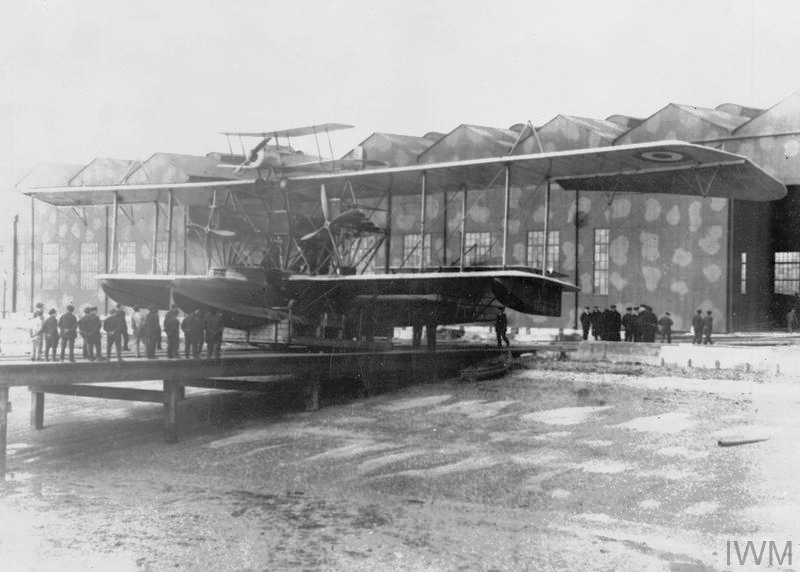
Felixstowe Porte Baby with Bristol Scout composite before flight, 1916

- First black military pilot: Ahmet Ali Çelikten a.k.a. Arap Ahmet Ali was the first black military pilot, served in Ottoman Aviation Squadrons from 1914 or 1915.
- First flight of a parasite or composite airplane: A Felixstowe Porte Baby carried aloft and then launched a Bristol Scout while in flight on May 17, 1916.
- First air-to-air rocket attack to down an aircraft: Eight aces including Nungesser downed six observation balloons on May 22, 1916, while flying Nieuport 16s armed with Le Prieur rockets, blinding the German Army for a French counter-attack on Fort Douaumont.
- First air-to-ground rocket attack: A roving Nieuport 16 equipped with Le Prieur rockets found a large ammunition dump, on June 29, 1916, and blew it up.
- First submarine sunk by aircraft: HMS B10 was sunk by Lohner L aircraft of the Kaiserliche und Königliche Seeflugwesen (Austrian Naval Air Service) while tied up at Venice on August 9, 1916.
- First flight across the Carpathians: Was made by Lieutenant Ioan Peneș, who flew a Farman MF.7 of the Romanian Air Corps from Băicoi to Săcele on September 1, 1916.
- First submarine sunk while underway by aircraft: French submarine Foucault was bombed by two Austro-Hungarian Lohner L seaplanes while off Cattaro on September 15, 1916, which resulted in Foucault being forced to surface and her crew to abandon ship.
- First authenticated membership in the "Mile-high club": By pilot/engineer Lawrence Sperry and pilot/socialite Dorothy Rice Sims in her Curtiss Model F flying boat, which was equipped with an autopilot near New York on November 21, 1916, however Sperry bumped the autopilot, and a botched landing resulted in both of them being discovered unclothed.
- First unmanned (drone) aircraft to respond to control from the ground (RPV): The Aerial Target on 21 March 1917.
- First landing by an airplane on a moving ship: Squadron Commander Edwin Dunning landed a Sopwith Pup on HMS Furious on August 2, 1917.
- First unmanned drone boats controlled from aircraft.: The Royal Navy and Royal Air Force at Dover saw trials by for distantly controlled boats over three days from May 28–31, 1918
- First flight by an all-metal aircraft with a stressed skin monocoque primary structure: By the Zeppelin-Lindau (Dornier) D.I cantilever biplane on June 4, 1918. It would also be the first such aircraft to enter production.
- First flight by an airplane across the Andes: Luis Candelaria flew from Zapala, Argentina, to Cunco, Chile, in a Morane-Saulnier Type L parasol monoplane on April 13, 1918, reaching an altitude of 13,000 ft (4,000 m).
- First child of a US president killed while piloting: On July 14, 1918 (Bastille Day), the youngest child of 26th US president Theodore Roosevelt, 2nd Lt. Quentin Roosevelt was killed serving in the 95th Aero Squadron at the commencement of the Second Battle of the Marne. Shot twice in the head, Roosevelt's killer is debated between Lt. Christian Donhauser of Jasta 17 and Lt. Karl Thom of Jasta 21. Roosevelt remains the only child of a US president killed in action, and only aviation death besides John F. Kennedy Jr.
- First attack by aircraft launched from an aircraft carrier: Sopwith Camels flown from HMS Furious for the Tondern raid on July 19, 1918, destroyed Zeppelins L 54 and L 60.
- First flight across the Andes above highest peaks: Teniente Dagoberto Godoy crossed from Chile to Argentina in a Bristol M.1C, on December 12, 1918, reaching an altitude of 20,700 ft (6,300 m), without oxygen.
- First flight over the Sierra Nevadas (US): Four US Army planes led by Lt. Col. Henry L. Watson crossed the Mountains and landed in Reno, NV on March 22, 1919. On the return trip they were accompanied by Governor Emmet D. Boyle to Sacramento, CA. The flight was made with three Liberty-powered Dehavillands and one Curtiss Trainer.
- First transatlantic flight: Albert Cushing Read with a crew of five in a US Navy Curtiss NC flying boat, the NC-4, flew from New York City to Plymouth, England via Newfoundland, the Azores, and Portugal from May 8–31, 1919, stopping 23 times.

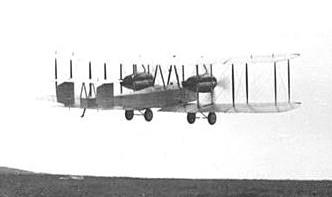
Alcock and Brown beginning their non-stop transatlantic flight in their Vickers Vimy, 1919

- First non–stop transatlantic flight: John Alcock and Arthur Brown flew a Vickers Vimy from St. John's, Newfoundland, to Clifden, Ireland, on June 14–15, 1919.
- First hijacking of an aircraft: To escape the short-lived Hungarian Soviet Republic of 1919, polymath Franz Nopcsa von Felső-Szilvás forged documents for him and his boyfriend Bajazid Elmaz Doda to receive escort on a military flight from Budapest to Sopron. Over Győr, Nopcsa forced the pilot at gunpoint to redirect them to Vienna, Republic of German-Austria.
- First England to Australia flight: Brothers Keith and Ross Macpherson Smith, with mechanics Sergeant Wallace H. Shiers and James M. Bennett, flew from Hounslow Heath Aerodrome to Darwin in a Vickers Vimy on December 10, 1919, winning a prize of £A10,000.
- First Rome to Tokyo flight: Pilot Arturo Ferrarin and engineer Gino Cappannini in an Ansaldo SVA biplane in winning the Rome-Tokyo Raid on May 31, 1920.
- First flight across the Andes by a woman: Adrienne Bolland flew a Caudron G.3 from Mendoza, Argentina, to Santiago on April 1, 1921.
- First flight by an aircraft with a pressurized cabin for high altitude flight: By a modified Engineering Division USD-9A A.S.40118 on June 8, 1921, by Art Smith.
- First African–American or Native American or Black person to obtain an international pilot's license: Bessie Coleman on June 15, 1921, on a Nieuport 82.
- First capital ship sunk by aircraft: Under orders from Brigadier General William L. Mitchell, one Handley-Page O/400 and six Martin NBS-1 bombers led by Capt. Walter R. Lawson bombed the captured ex-German World War I battleship, Ostfriesland during a series of airpower tests, sinking it on July 21, 1921.
- First crop duster: John Macready successfully flew a Curtiss Jenny that had been specially modified in a joint U.S. Department of Agriculture, and U.S. Army Signal Corps project from McCook Field in Dayton, Ohio to spray crops with lead arsenate to control a caterpillar infestation on August 3, 1921.

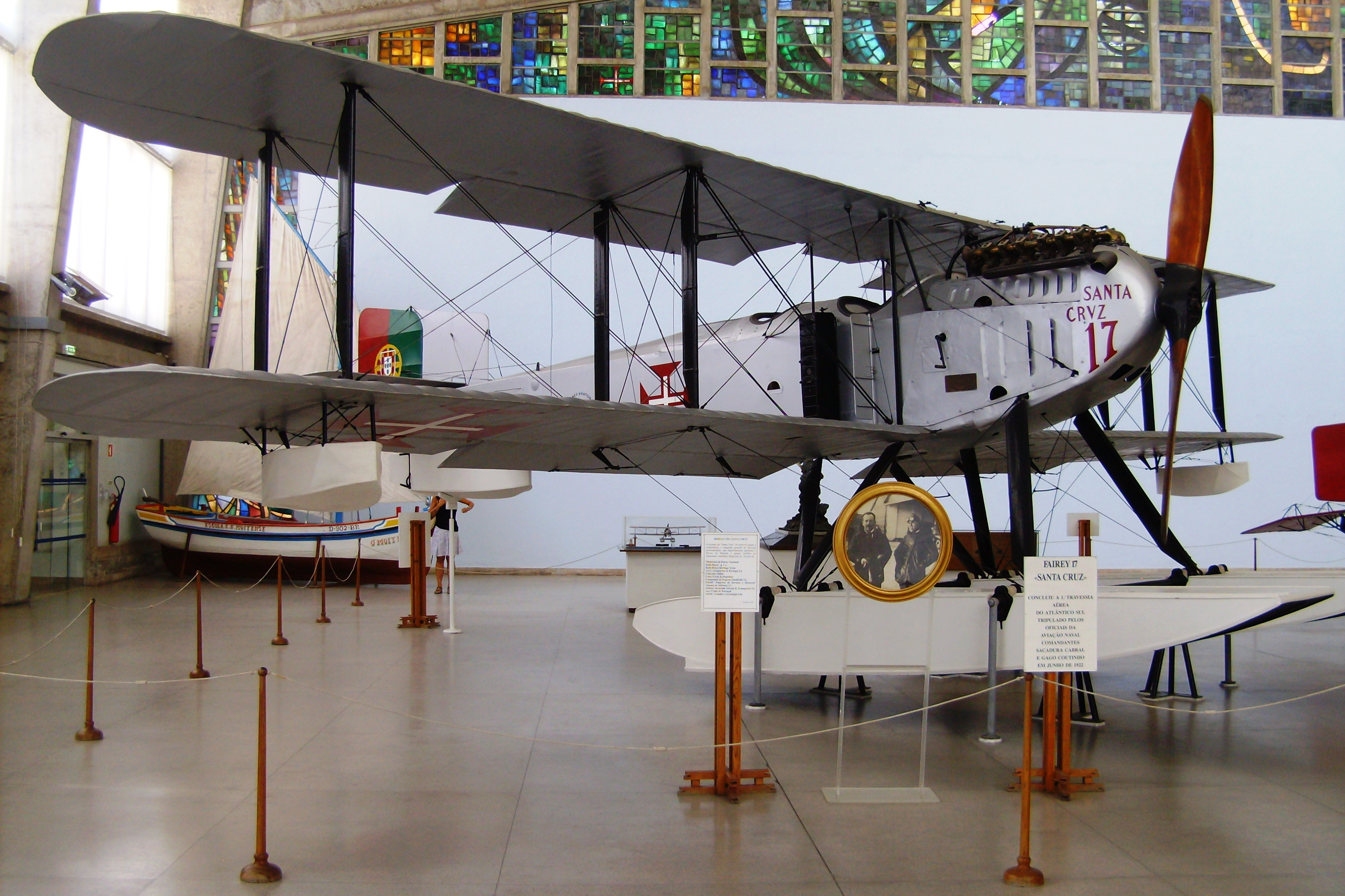
Fairey III.D that completed the first crossing of the South Atlantic in 1922

- First aerial refueling: Done by Wesley "Wes" May, Frank Hawks and Earl Daugherty with a Lincoln Standard biplane and a Curtiss Jenny in 1921.
- First flight to sustain a speed over 200 mph (170 kn; 320 km/h): Joseph Sadi-Lecointe flew a Nieuport-Delage Sesquiplan racer over a distance of 100 km (54 nmi; 62 mi) at an average speed in excess of 200 mph on September 30, 1922.
- First aerial crossing of the South Atlantic (with aircraft replacement): Artur de Sacadura Cabral and Gago Coutinho flew from Lisbon, Portugal, to Rio de Janeiro, Brazil, in a total of three Fairey III.D floatplanes between March 30 and June 17, 1922. The first to use astronomical navigation (and to rely solely on it during the crossing), with an artificial horizon for aeronautical use.
- First autogyro/autogiro flight: Alejandro Gomez Spencer made the first successful Autogyro flight in the Cierva C.4 on January 9, 1923 (O.C.), previous designs having failed to achieve flight.
- First non-stop transcontinental flight across North America: Lt. John A. Macready and Lt. Oakley G. Kelly flew from Roosevelt Field, Long Island, New York to Rockwell Field, San Diego, California in a Fokker T-2 in 26 hours and 51 minutes, on May 2–3, 1923.
- First aerial refueling with a fuel line: A DH-4B biplane of the United States Army Air Service successfully refuelled another DH.4B, piloted by Lowell Smith, in mid-air on June 27, 1923.
- First flight from Portugal to China: Using two different aircraft, Sarmento de Beires and Brito Pais flew 16,380 km (8,840 nmi; 10,180 mi) in 115 hours 45 minutes of flying time from Vila Nova de Milfontes, Alentejo to Shenzhen, near Hong Kong, between April 7 and June 20, 1924,

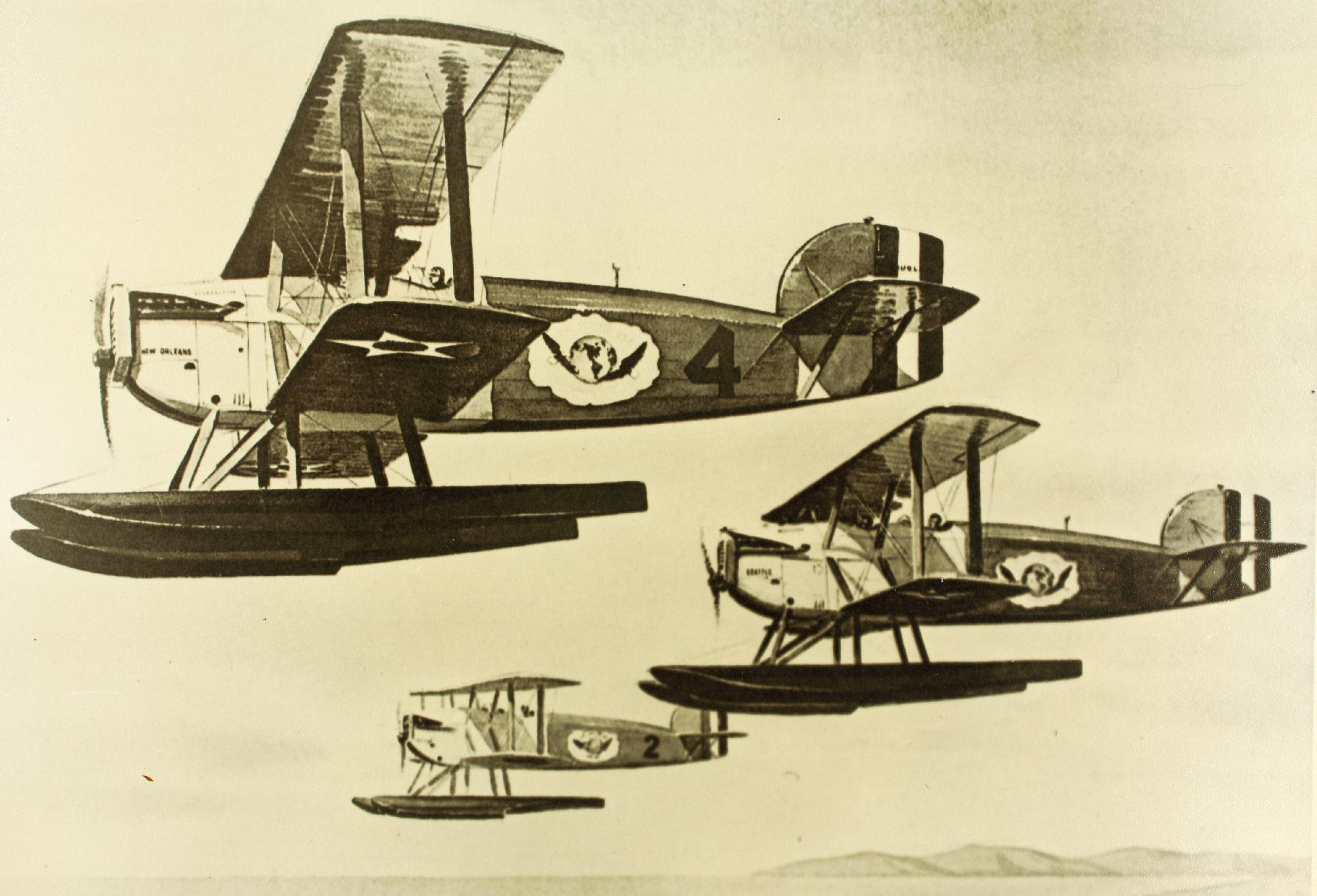
USAAS Douglas World Cruisers on their world circumnavigation flight in 1924

- First aerial circumnavigation: Pilots Lowell H. Smith, Erik H. Nelson and John Harding Jr., in a pair of Douglas World Cruisers of the United States Army Air Service completed an aerial east–west circumnavigation of the world starting and ending in Seattle Washington, between April 6 and September 28, 1924. (Note: Unless specified, most circumnavigation flights were not done along the greatest distance, at the equator, but merely crossed all lines of longitude – often at high latitudes, and as far north as possible.)
- First Amsterdam to Tokyo flight: Pedro Leandro Zanni and mechanic Felipe Beltrame, flew 9,187 nmi (10,572 mi; 17,014 km), with a change of aircraft in Hanoi, from July 26 to October 11, 1924, with a flight time of 119 hours 50 minutes.
- First nighttime aerial photograph by Lieutenant George W. Goddard of the United States Army Air Service on the night of November 20, 1925 using a flash bomb and aerial reconnaissance camera while flying over the Eastman Kodak building in Rochester, N Y.
- First aerial crossing of the South Atlantic (single aircraft): Ramón Franco, Julio Ruiz de Alda Miqueleiz, Juan Manuel Duran and Pablo Rada, made between Spain and South America in the Plus Ultra, in January 1926.

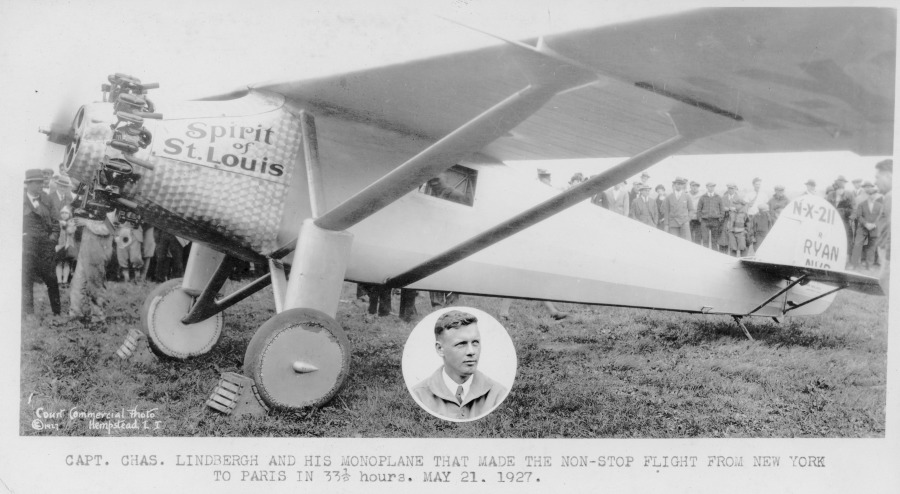
Charles Lindbergh and his monoplane the Spirit of St. Louis that made the non-stop flight from New York to Paris on May 21, 1927

- First flight of a flying wing airplane: Was made by the Chyeranovskii BICh-3 in 1926.
- First successful flight of a glider tow plane: Was made with a Raab-Katzenstein RK.6 Kranich flown by Kurt Katzenstein, towing a Raab-Katzenstein RK 7 Schmetterling glider flown by Antonius Raab on April 13, 1927.
- First solo non-stop New York to Paris (city to city) transatlantic flight: Charles Lindbergh, flying the Spirit of St. Louis, made the 33-hour journey from New York to Paris on May 20–21, 1927, winning the Orteig Prize.
- First outside loop: Jimmy Doolittle, in a Curtiss P-1B Hawk on May 25, 1927.
- First flight from U.S. mainland to Hawaii: U.S. Army lieutenants Albert Francis Hegenberger and Lester J. Maitland flew from California to Hawaii in the Bird of Paradise, a C-2 transport, on June 28–29, 1927.
- First female airline pilot: Marga von Etzdorf was hired by Lufthansa in 1927.
- First east–west non–stop transatlantic crossing: The Bremen, a Junkers W 33 flown by Hermann Köhl with James Fitzmaurice as copilot, flew from Baldonnel, Ireland to Greenly Island in Quebec from April 12–13, 1928
- First long distance mass formation flight: Italo Balbo led 60 Savoia-Marchetti S.55 flying boats from May 25 to June 2, 1928, from Tuscany over the Balearic Islands, along Spanish and French coasts, and finally returning to Italy.
- First transpacific flight (US to Australia): Charles Kingsford Smith and crew, in the Southern Cross, flew from Oakland, California, to Brisbane, Australia via Hawaii and Fiji, between May 31 and June 9, 1928.
- First rocket-powered aircraft to fly: Was the Lippisch Ente flown by Fritz Stamer on June 11, 1928, using solid fuel rockets.
- First woman to fly across the Atlantic (as passenger): Amelia Earhart was flown by Wilmer Stultz and Louis Gordon, in a Fokker F.VII, from Trepassey, Newfoundland, to Burry Port, Wales, on June 17, 1928.
- First aircraft to fly powered with a diesel engine: Was a Stinson SM-1DX Detroiter powered with a Packard DR-980 flown by Walter E. Lees on September 19, 1928.
- First deployment of a whole-aircraft parachute recovery system: Was made by Roscoe Turner flying a Thunderbird W-14 biplane on April 14, 1929.
- First ship-launched flight to deliver transatlantic mail: Jobst von Studnitz flew a Heinkel HE 12 with 11,000 pieces of mail from the SS Bremen while still at sea, to New York City several hours before the ship docked, on July 26, 1929.
- First aircraft to be flown only on instruments (blind flying): Was by Jimmy Doolittle in a Consolidated NY-2 on September 24, 1929.
- First flight over the South Pole: In the "Floyd Bennett", a Ford 4-AT-B trimotor flown by Bernt Balchen with Harold June as co-pilot and Richard E. Byrd navigating, arriving shortly after midnight on November 29, 1929.

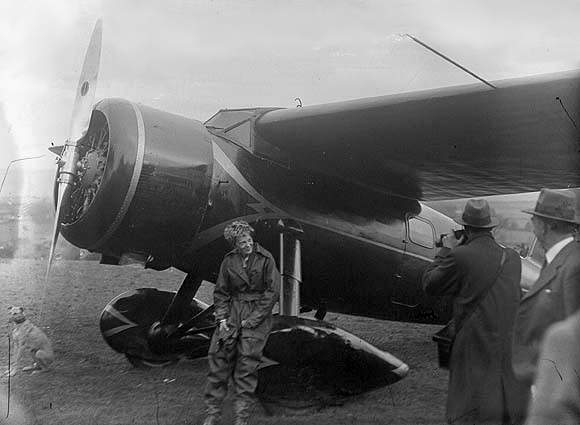
Amelia Earhart with the Lockheed Vega 5B she crossed the Atlantic in May 1932

- First aircraft to fly with a de-icing system: Was a National Air Transport Boeing Model 40 modified by William C. Geer with an expanding rubber boot mounted on a strut, which was flown by Wesley L. Smith in late March 1930 for the first of three test flights than continued into April.
- First female pilot to fly solo from England to Australia: Amy Johnson in a de Havilland DH60 Gipsy Moth taking off from Croydon Airport 5 May 1930 and landing in Darwin 24 May 1930 making 24 stops along the way.
- First trans-oceanic mass formation flight: Italo Balbo led twelve Savoia-Marchetti S.55 flying boats from Orbetello Airfield, Italy to Rio de Janeiro, Brazil between December 17, 1930, and January 15, 1931, which was documented in the first Italian aviation film Atlantic Flight (1931 film).
- First flight by an aircraft with variable-sweep wings: Was by the tailless Westland-Hill Pterodactyl IV with Flight-Lieutenant Louis G. Paget at the controls in April or May 1931. The wing sweep could be adjusted by 4.75 degrees in flight to provide trim adjustment.
- First non-stop flight across the Pacific: Clyde Pangborn and Hugh Herndon flew 41 hours, 13 minutes in a heavily modified Bellanca CH-400 Skyrocket named Miss Veedol from Samushiro, Japan, to Wenatchee, Washington, on October 4–5, 1931.
- First female pilot to fly solo across the Atlantic Ocean: Amelia Earhart, in a Lockheed Vega 5B, flew from Harbour Grace, Newfoundland, to Culmore, Ireland, on May 20, 1932.
- First successful helicopter with a single main lifting rotor: Alexei Cheremukhin and Boris Yuriev's TsAGI-1EA, which flew to a record altitude of 1,985 ft (605 m) on August 14, 1932.
- First flight over Mount Everest: Lord Clydesdale in a Westland PV-3 and David McIntyre, in a Westland PV-6 flew over Everest on April 3, 1933, during their Houston–Mount Everest flight expedition.
- First proven act of sabotage to a commercial aircraft in flight: The crash of a United Airlines Boeing 247 near Chesterton, Indiana, United States on October 10, 1933, killing all seven people aboard, was found to have been caused by a nitroglycerin-based bomb detonated during flight; eyewitnesses on the ground had seen the explosion. The saboteur was never identified. The perpetrator or perpetrators were never identified.
- First scheduled commercial trans-Pacific passenger service: A Pan-American Martin M-130 began a proving flight on November 22, 1935, that led to passengers being carried on a regularly scheduled service from San Francisco to Manila that began on October 21, 1936.

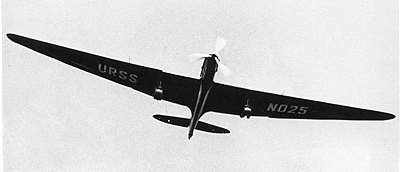
Tupolev ANT-25RD which completed the first polar crossing in 1937

- First flight by a British monarch: King Edward VIII was flown from Sandringham House to London in a de Havilland Rapide on January 20, 1936.
- First flight by a delta wing aircraft: Was made by the Moskalyev SAM-9 Strela, flown by A.N.Rybko in early 1937.
- First trans–polar flight: A Tupolev ANT-25RD flown by Valery Pavlovich Chkalov with copilot Georgy Filippovich Baydukov and navigator Alexander Vasilyevich Belyakov from Schelkovo air base on the outskirts of Moscow, to Pearson Field in Vancouver, Washington, crossing the Arctic for the first time from June 18–20, 1937 over a distance of 4,930 nmi (5,670 mi; 9,130 km) in 63 hours and 25 minutes.
- First transatlantic commercial proving flights and quadruple crossing: An Imperial Airways Short Empire flying boat and a Pan-American Sikorsky S-42 flying boat both crossed the Atlantic on July 5, 1937, and then made the return flight. Both aircraft were operating at the extreme limits of their respective ranges, and so commercial service didn't start until a few years later.
- First flight of a commercial aircraft with a pressurized cabin that would enter service: Was made on December 31, 1938, by the Boeing 307 Stratoliner.

=== Jet age, 1939–present ===
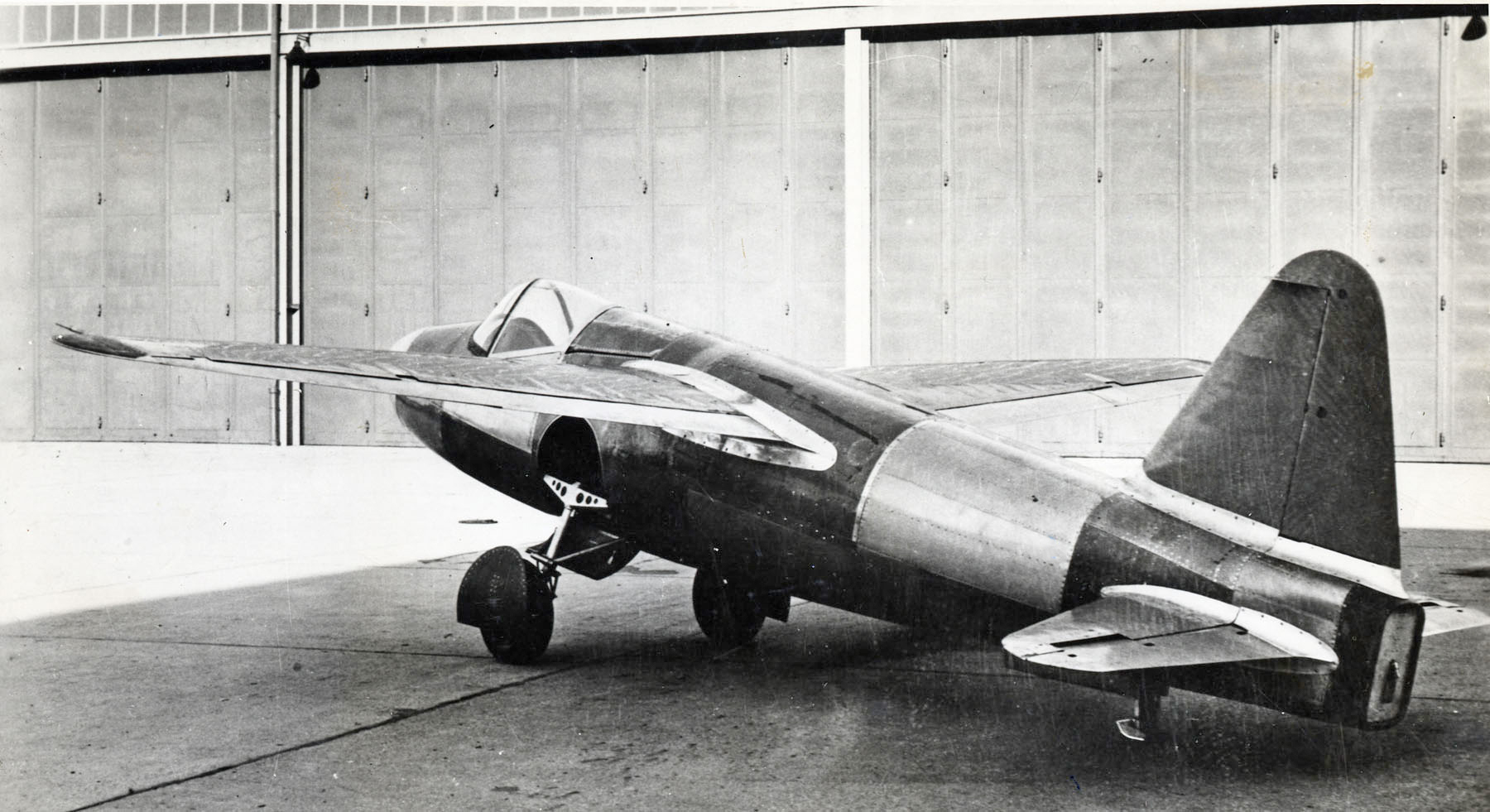
Heinkel He 178, the first turbojet-powered aircraft to fly

- First flight by a liquid-fueled rocket-powered aircraft: Was made by a Heinkel He 176 flown by Erich Warsitz on June 20, 1939.
- First scheduled commercial transatlantic passenger service: Pan American Boeing 314 Clipper Yankee Clipper flying boats made the first scheduled commercial flight between New York City and Marseille, France on June 28, 1939.
- First flight by a turbojet-powered aircraft: Was made with a Heinkel He 178, flown by Erich Warsitz on August 27, 1939.
- First Ramjet powered flight: Was made by Petr Yermolayevich Loginov in a Polikarpov I-15bisDM modified with 2 DM-2 ramjets on January 25, 1940, with prior flights being made in December without the ramjets being powered.
- First operational use of a military assault glider: Was by the Luftwaffe, which used DFS 230 gliders to take the Fort Eben-Emael, and to capture critical bridges over the Albert Canal on May 10, 1940.
- First successful interception using airborne radar: Was by a Bristol Blenheim 1F of the Fighter Interception Development Unit RAF, which guided by its aircraft interception radar, shot down a Dornier 17 on the night of July 22/23, 1940.
- First flight of an aircraft powered by a motorjet/thermojet: Was with a Caproni Campini N.1 flown by Mario de Bernardi on August 27, 1940
- First flight with an afterburner: Was made by a Caproni Campini C.C.2 motorjet on 11 April 1941.
- First capital ships sunk by aircraft while underway: Were HMS Repulse, followed by HMS Prince of Wales, by Japanese Mitsubishi G4Ms of the Kanoya, Genzan and Mihoro Air Groups on December 10, 1941.
- First use of an Airborne Early Warning radar system: Vickers Wellington Mk.Ic R1629 was modified with a rotating radar array to increase detection range, and to direct fighters to intercept Focke-Wulf Fw 200 Condor bombers being used in the anti-shipping role, with the first operational trials occurring in April 1942. Advances in radar technology quickly made it obsolete, but similar conversions were also made in 1944 to Wellington Mk.XIV bombers to direct the interceptions of Heinkel He 111s that were launching V-1 flying bombs (cruise missiles) under the name "Air Controlled Interception". Beaufighters were directed toward the Heinkels while Mosquitos were directed to the V-1s, if a launch occurred.
- First flight by an incumbent US President: Was made by Franklin D. Roosevelt aboard the Boeing 314 Clipper on January 11, 1943. The seaplane flew from International Pan American Airport in Miami, bound for Trinidad, ultimately crossing the Atlantic for the Casablanca Conference.
- First purpose-built jet bomber to fly: Was the Arado Ar 234 which made its first flight on July 30, 1943.
- First rocket-powered aircraft used in combat: Major Späte of the EK 16 service test unit flew a Messerschmitt Me 163B Komet interceptor against Allied aircraft on May 13, 1944.
- First jet fighter used in combat: A Messerschmitt Me 262 jet fighter flown by Leutnant Alfred Schreiber of Ekdo 262 service test unit attacked an RAF 540 Squadron de Havilland Mosquito, but failed to shoot it down on July 26, 1944.
- First jet on jet aerial victory: Was scored by Flying Officer Dean of the Royal Air Force in a Gloster Meteor Mk.I EE216 against a V-1 flying bomb on August 4, 1944.
- First aircraft to fly with an area rule design: Was the Junkers Ju 287 on August 8, 1944.

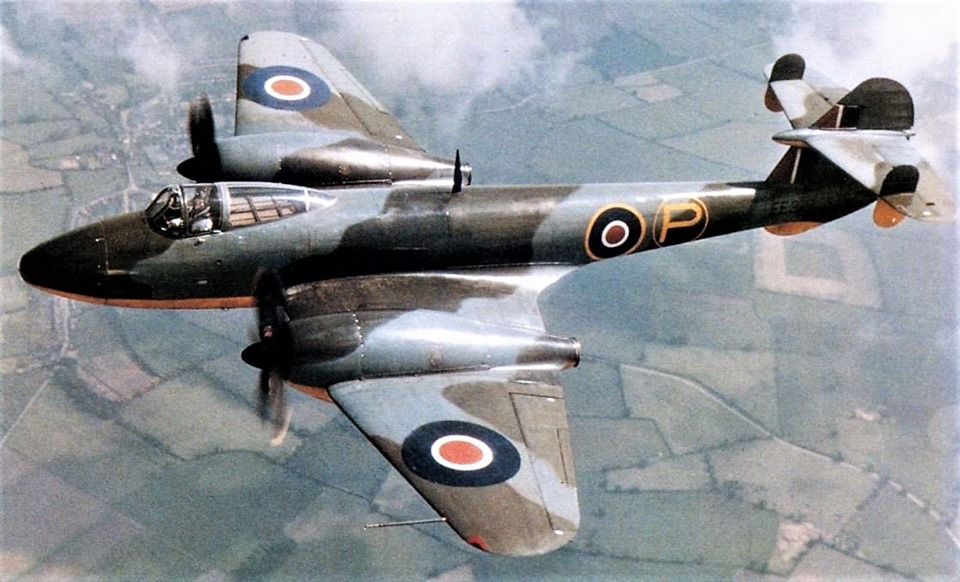
First turboprop to fly, the Gloster Meteor F.I powered by two Rolls-Royce Trent turboprops in 1945

- First fully automatic blind landing: Was made with Boeing 247D DZ203 by Flight Lieutenant Frank Griffiths of the Royal Air Force on 16 January 1945, while subsequent tests confirmed it in inclement weather. Previous landing systems required the pilot to see for the final approach.
- First aircraft to use a nuclear weapon: Was USAAF Boeing B-29 Superfortress Enola Gay flown by Paul Tibbets and under the command of William Sterling Parsons which dropped Little Boy on the Japanese city of Hiroshima, where it detonated at an approximate altitude of 1,800 to 2,000 ft (550 to 610 m) and with a force of 16 ± 2 kilotons of TNT (66.9 ± 8.4 TJ) on August 6, 1945.
- First turboprop powered aircraft to fly: Was a modified Gloster Meteor F.I powered by two Rolls-Royce Trent turbine engines driving propellers, on September 20, 1945.
- First scheduled commercial transatlantic passenger service using landplanes: Was made with an American Overseas Airlines Douglas DC-4 between New York City and Hurn Airport in England via Gander, Newfoundland, and Shannon, Ireland on October 23, 1945.

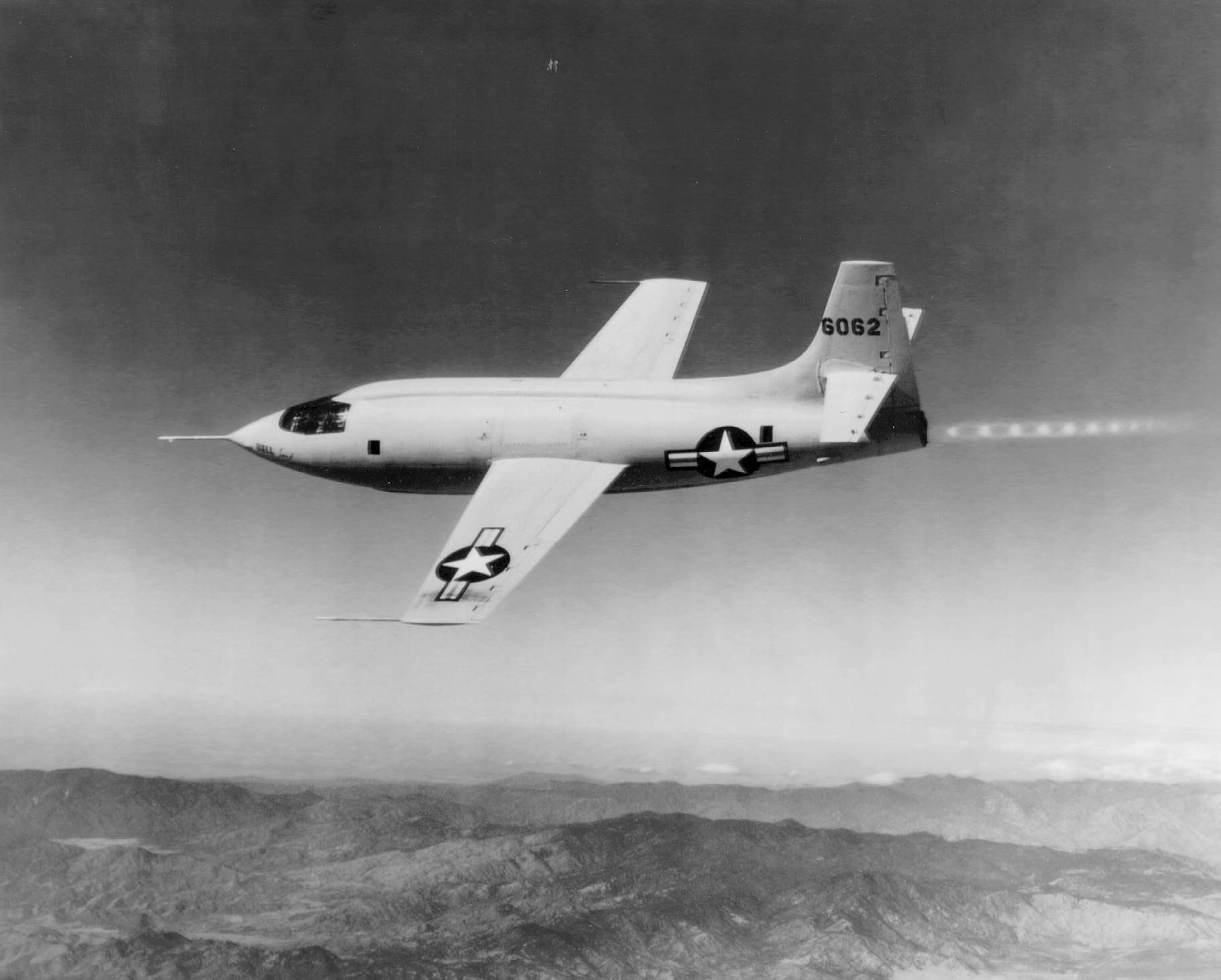
Bell X-1, first aircraft confirmed to have exceeded Mach 1, flown by Chuck Yeager on October 14, 1947

- First landing of a jet aircraft on an aircraft carrier: Eric Brown landed a de Havilland Vampire on the Royal Navy carrier HMS Ocean on December 3, 1945.
- First known wheel-well stowaway: An Indonesian orphan, Bas Wie, 12, hid in the wheel well of a Dutch Douglas DC-3 flying from Kupang to Darwin, Australia, on August 7, 1946. He survived the three-hour flight despite severe injuries, and later became an Australian citizen.
- First documented supersonic flight: Was by Chuck Yeager in a Bell X-1 on October 14, 1947.
- First flight by a jet transport: Was by a Rolls-Royce Nene-powered Vickers VC.1 Viking on April 6, 1948.
- First nonstop around-the-world flight: Starting on February 26, Capt. James Gallagher and his crew refuelled inflight four times in Boeing B-50A Superfortress Lucky Lady II while flying around the world, to return to where they started at Carswell AFB in Texas on March 2, 1949.
- First criminal prosecution of an aircraft bombing: Albert Guay along with two accomplices was convicted of murder and hanged for the bombing of Canadian Pacific Air Lines Douglas DC-3 Flight 108 on September 9, 1949, which killed all 23 occupants including his wife and intended target, Rita Guay née Morel.
- First jet on manned jet aerial victory: Was thought to have been by Lt. Brown in a F-80 over a MiG-15 on November 8, 1950, however that MiG survived. Instead the first victory was made in a Grumman F9F-2B Panther flown by Lt. Cdr. William T. Amen, commanding officer of VF-111, over Captain Mikhail Grachev in a MiG-15 from the 139th Guards Fighter Aviation Regiment on November 9, 1950.
- First aircraft to deploy a boosted fission weapon: Was a Boeing B-50 Superfortress over Nevada Test Site, US, in Operation Tumbler–Snapper shot Dog, yielding 19 kilotons on May 1, 1952.
- First commercial jet airliner to enter service; the de Havilland Comet entered service with BOAC on May 2, 1952.
- First propeller driven aircraft to exceed the speed of sound (in a dive): Was a McDonnell XF-88 Voodoo (without assistance from the jet engines) flown by Capt. Fitzpatrick in late June, 1953.
- First aircraft to exceed Mach 2: Scott Crossfield was first to fly at twice the speed of sound in a Douglas D-558-2 Skyrocket on November 20, 1953.
- First supercruise sustained supersonic flight in horizontal flight without using afterburner: Was made by a Nord Gerfaut I research aircraft on August 3, 1954.
- First nuclear reactor operated on an aircraft: The Convair NB-36H tested an onboard reactor that was not connected to the engines, first flying on September 17, 1955
- First aircraft to deploy a thermonuclear weapon: Was a Tupolev Tu-16 over Semipalatinsk Test Site, USSR, in the RDS-37 test, yielding 1.6 megatons on November 22, 1955.
- First aircraft shot down with a Surface-to-Air Missile (SAM): Was a Taiwanese Martin RB-57D Canberra over China that was hit by three SA-2/V-750 missiles on October 7, 1959.
- First manned Jetpack flights: Engineer Wendell Moore made the first flight at Bell Laboratories in February 1961.
- First supersonic flight by an airliner: Was made by William Magruder in a dive from altitude with a Douglas DC-8-43, briefly reaching a speed of Mach 1.012 at 574 kn (661 mph; 1,063 km/h) at 41,088 ft (12,524 m) during a test flight on August 21, 1961.
- First aircraft to transit outer space and first to launch a spacecraft: Was a North American X-15, launched from the Balls 8 mothership out of Edwards AFB, US, on July 19, 1963.
- First solo circumnavigation by a woman: Jerrie Mock returned to Columbus, Ohio, on May 17, 1964, having flown around the world in her Cessna 180 Skywagon since leaving the same airport 29 days earlier in a race with Joan Merriam Smith, who had followed a different route.
- First pole-to-pole circumnavigation: Was completed by Captains Fred Austin and Harrison Finch in Boeing 707-349C "Pole Cat", in 57 hours, 27 minutes on 15 November 1965.
- First V/STOL jet combat aircraft to enter service: No. 1 Squadron RAF began conversion to the Hawker Siddeley Harrier GR.1 on April 18, 1969.
- First supersonic flight by a commercial aircraft: Was made by a Tupolev Tu-144 on June 5, 1969.
- First woman to fly for a major U.S. airline: Bonnie Tiburzi became the first female pilot for a major U.S. airline, American Airlines, in March 1973.
- First manned flight by an electrically powered aeroplane: Was made with a Brditschka MB-E1, a modified motor glider with an 8–10 kW (11–13 hp) Bosch KM77 electric motor on October 23, 1973.
- First aircraft to deploy an intercontinental ballistic missile: Was a Lockheed C-5A Galaxy, dropping a LGM-30B Minuteman I on October 24, 1974. The missile engine burned for 10 seconds and it ascended 3.7 km.
- First scheduled supersonic passenger flights: Were made with Concorde SSTs from London to Bahrain, and simultaneously from Paris to Rio de Janeiro on January 21, 1976.
- First return from orbit by a spaceplane: Was made by the Space Shuttle orbiter Columbia's STS-1 mission landing at Edwards AFB, US, on April 14, 1981.
- First circumnavigation by helicopter: H. Ross Perot, Jr. and Jay Coburn in Bell 206L-1 LongRanger II Spirit of Texas, from September 1 to 30, 1982.
- First aircraft to destroy a satellite: Was a McDonnell Douglas F-15A Eagle from Vandenberg AFB, US, firing an ASM-135 ASAT against Solwind P78-1 on September 13, 1985.
- First non-stop, un-refueled flight around the Earth: Was made by Dick Rutan and Jeana Yeager in the Rutan Voyager over 9 days, 3 minutes and 44 seconds, running from December 14 to 23, 1986.
- First all-female airliner crew: Was the American Airlines Boeing 727 flown from Washington D.C. to Dallas, Texas captained by Beverley Bass on December 30, 1986.
- First helicopter to the North Pole: Was a Bell Jetranger III flown by Dick Smith on April 28, 1987.

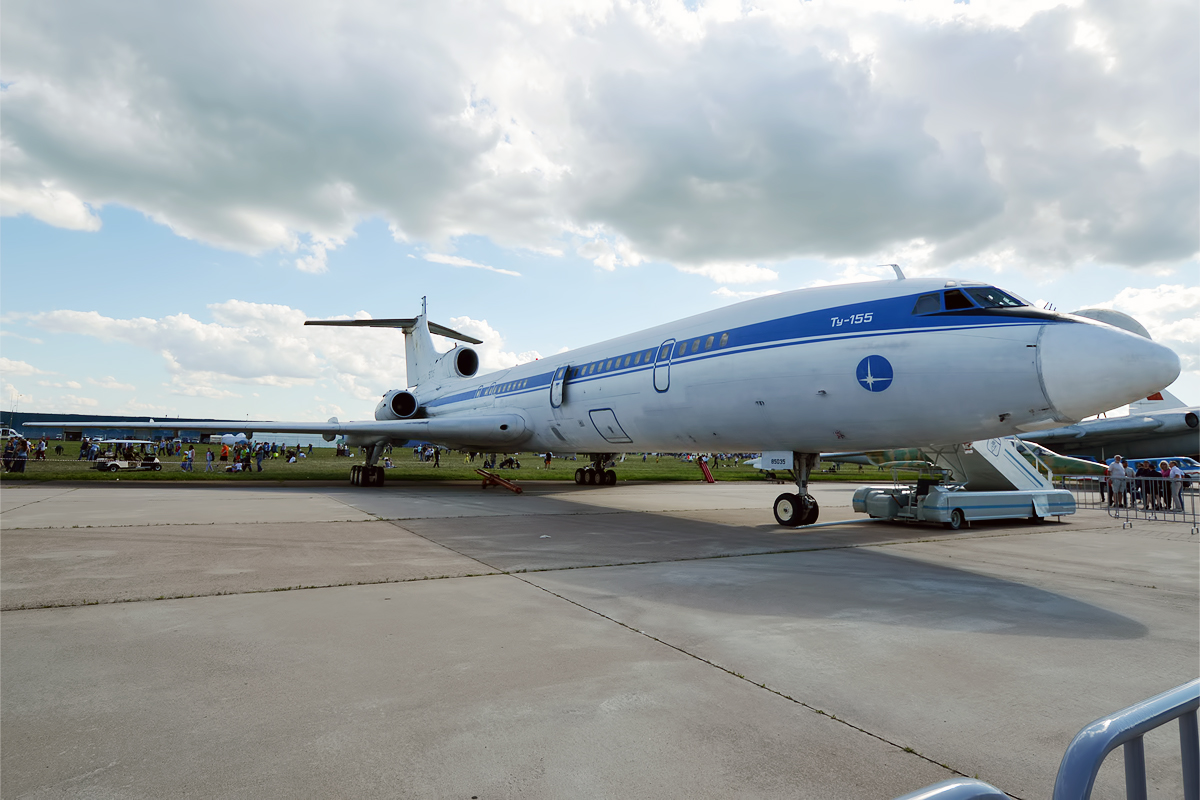
Tupolev Tu-155, the first aircraft to fly solely on hydrogen

- First flight by an aircraft fuelled only with hydrogen: Was made by a Tupolev Tu-155 (a modified Tu-154 airliner) powered only by hydrogen on April 15, 1988. A NACA Martin B-57B flew on hydrogen in February 1957, but only for 20 minutes before reverting to jet fuel.
- First orbital flight by an uncrewed spaceplane: Was made by the Buran, launching and landing at Baikonur Cosmodrome, USSR, on November 15, 1988.
- First circumnavigation which landed at both poles: Was made in a de Havilland Canada DHC-6 Twin Otter flown by Dick Smith, who carried out landings on both poles during 1988 and 1989.
- First use of a stealth aircraft in combat: Was of USAF Lockheed F-117A Nighthawks during the United States invasion of Panama, bombing the Rio Hato Air Base in December 1989.
- First east-west circumnavigation by helicopter: Was completed in a Sikorsky S-76 by Dick Smith in 1995.
- First hijacking of aircraft for use as a weapon: In the September 11th attacks, four American commercial flights — American Airlines Flight 11, American Airlines Flight 77, and United Airlines Flight 93, and United Airlines Flight 175 — were hijacked by 19 members of al-Qaeda and successfully attacked the World Trade Center and the Pentagon. Causing the direct or indirect deaths of all 19 terrorists and 2,977+ victims, it is deadliest terrorist attack in history.
- First to land a helicopter at both Poles: Quentin Smith & Steve Brooks landed a Robinson R44 at the North Pole in October 2002 and at the South Pole in January 2005.

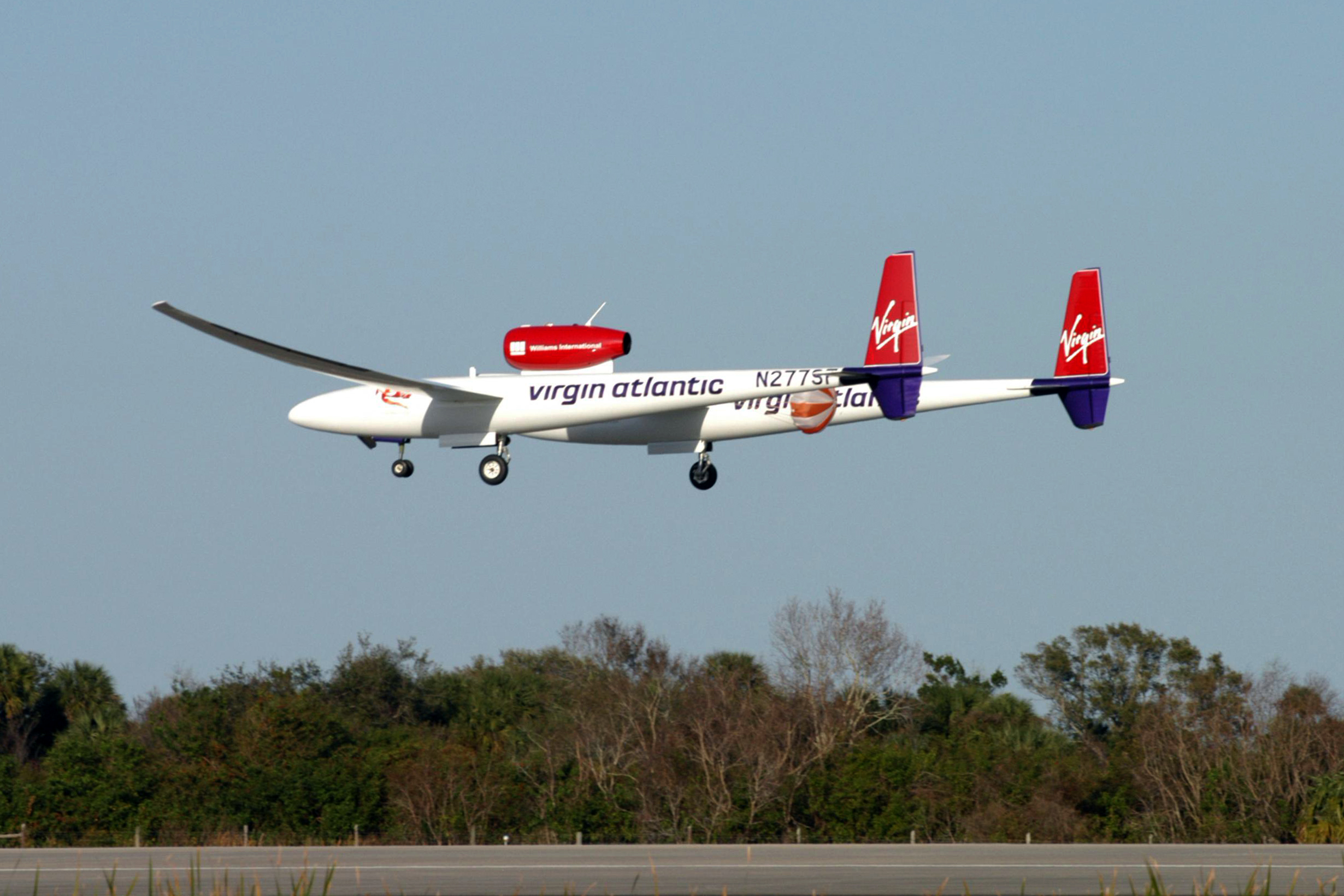
The Virgin Atlantic GlobalFlyer that Steve Fossett piloted solo around the world non-stop in 2005

- First solo non-stop fixed-wing aircraft flight around the Earth: Was made in the Virgin Atlantic GlobalFlyer, flown by Steve Fossett, from Salina, Kansas, from February 28 to March 3, 2005, in 67 hours.
- First solo flight by an armless pilot: Just using her legs Jessica Cox earned her pilot's license on May 10, 2008, flying an Ercoupe from San Manuel Airport, Arizona.
- First piloted overnight solar-powered flight in a fixed-wing aircraft: Made by André Borschberg on the Solar Impulse 1 between July 7–8, 2010.
- First flight of a human-powered helicopter exceeding 60 seconds: AeroVelo Atlas flight in Ontario Soccer Centre, Canada, winning the Igor I. Sikorsky Human Powered Helicopter Competition on June 13, 2013.
- First trans-Atlantic flight by autogyro: Norman Surplus flew solo from Belfast, Maine, to Larne, Northern Ireland in a Rotorsport UK MT-03 Autogyro "Roxy" between July 8, 2015, and August 11, 2015.
- First piloted non-stop solar-powered transatlantic flight: Bertrand Piccard flew from New York City to Seville in the Solar Impulse 2 between June 20–23, 2016.
- First circumnavigation of the world by a piloted fixed-wing aircraft using only solar power: Solar Impulse 2 between March 2015 and July 2016; Borschberg and Piccard alternated piloting stages of the journey.
- First circumnavigation by helicopter passing antipodal points: (Note: Points on opposite sides of the globe) Peter Wilson and Matthew Gallagher flew a Robinson R66 on August 7, 2017.
- First electroaerodynamic thrust winged Ion-propelled aircraft test flight: MIT EAD Airframe Version 2 using ionic wind on November 21, 2018.
- First circumnavigation by autogyro: Norman Surplus flew a RotorSport UK MT-03 between June 1, 2015, and June 28, 2019, from McMinnville, Oregon, USA, for an eastbound circumnavigation.
- First female circumnavigation via both poles: Payload Specialist Jannicke Mikkelsen, and Flight Attendant Magdelena Starowicz, flew as part of the crew of a Gulfstream G650ER One More Orbit between July 9, 2019, and July 11, 2019.
- First powered, controlled takeoff and landing on another planet or celestial body: Was the NASA rotorcraft Ingenuity on Mars on April 19, 2021.
- First privately funded and developed aircraft to break the sound barrier: Boom Supersonic's chief test pilot Tristan "Geppetto" Brandenburg flew the Boom XB-1 from Mojave Air & Space Port, reaching Mach 1.122 on January 28, 2025.
- First aircraft to launch an attack via outer space: Were Israeli F-15 and F-35I fighters, firing air-launched ballistic missiles, hitting Doha, Qatar, on September 9, 2025.

== See also ==
- Australian aviation firsts
- Circumnavigation
- List of circumnavigations
- Firsts in human spaceflight
- Timeline of women in aviation
