= List of Australian aviation firsts =

List of firsts for aviation in Australia or for Australian aviators.

== International ==
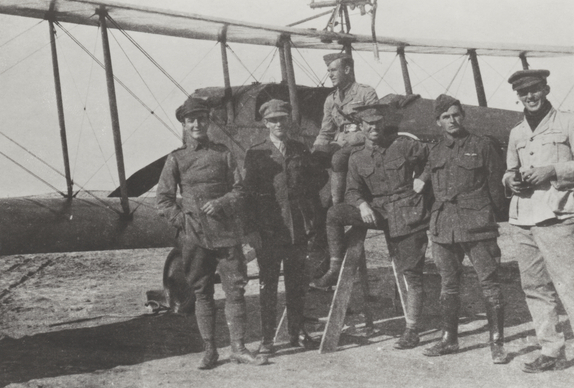
Frank McNamara (left), Kantara, Suez Canal, Egypt c. May 1917

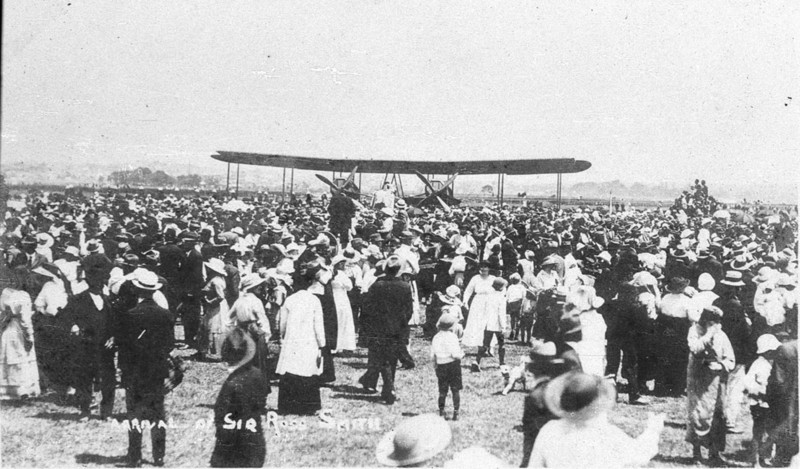
Arrival of Sir Ross Smith's Vickers Vimy at Mascot, Sydney, NSW. 1920-02-14.

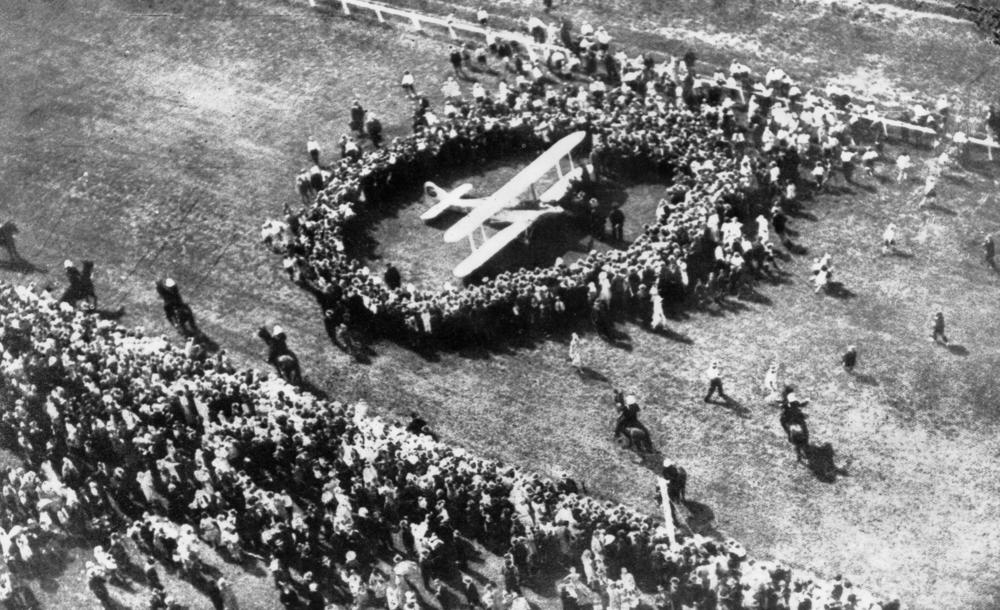
Bert Hinkler returning to Brisbane after his solo flight London to Brisbane, February 1928

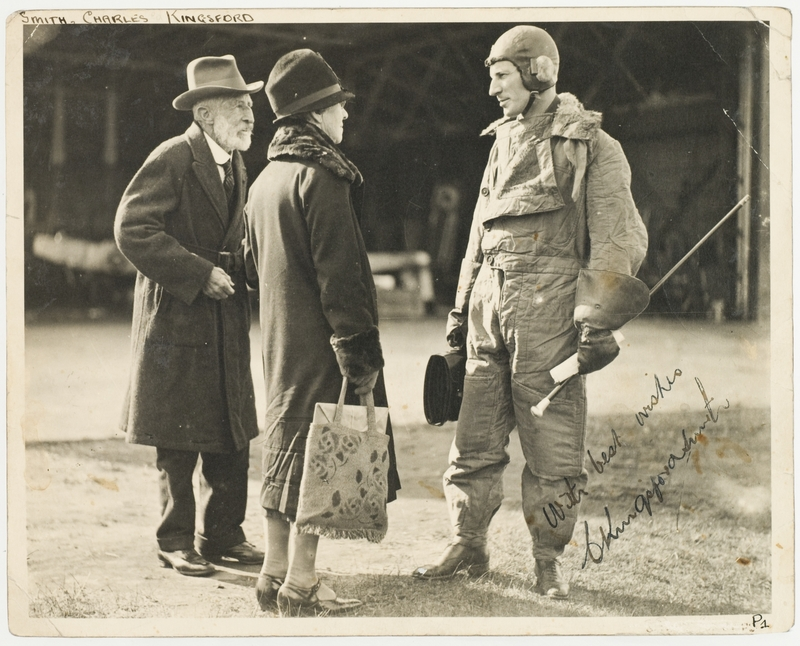
Charles Kingsford-Smith with his Mother and Father, 1928.

Year	Date	Event	Location	Plane	Aviator(s)
1917	1917-03-20	Victoria Cross for Australian Aviator	Gaza	B.E.2c	Frank McNamara (VC)
1919	1919-12-10	England to Australia	Hounslow to Darwin	Vickers Vimy	Keith Smith, Ross Smith
1928	1928-02-22	England to Australia, solo	Croydon Airport to Darwin	Avro Avian	Bert Hinkler
1928	1928-06-09	North America to Australia	Oakland to Brisbane	Fokker F.VII	Charles Kingsford Smith, Charles Ulm, James Warner, Harry Lyon
1928	1928-09-11	Australia to New Zealand	Richmond, New South Wales to Christchurch	Fokker F.VII	Charles Kingsford Smith, Charles Ulm, Harold Litchfield, Thomas H. McWilliams
1928	1928-12-20	Antarctic Continent, first flight over	Deception Island to Deception Island	Lockheed Vega	Hubert Wilkins
1930	1930-05-24	England to Australia, solo, female	Croydon Airport to Darwin	Gipsy Moth	Amy Johnson
1930	1930-07-04	Circumnavigation of Earth, via Australia	Oakland, California to Oakland, California, flying west	Fokker F.VII	Charles Kingsford Smith, Charles Ulm
1931	1931-01-07	Australia to New Zealand, solo	Sydney Airport to Hari Hari, Westland	Avro Avian	Guy Menzies
1937	1937-08-18	Australia to South Africa, solo via Asia	Archerfield to Cape Town	Klemm Kl 32	Maude Bonney
1948	1948-11-20	Australia to South Africa, via Indian Ocean	Sydney Airport to Palmietfontein Airport	Avro Lancastrian	L.R. Ambrose
1951	1951-03-27	Australia to South America	Rose Bay, New South Wales to Valparaíso	Catalina	Patrick Gordon Taylor
1983	1983-07-22	Circumnavigation of Earth by helicopter, solo	Fort Worth, Texas to Fort Worth, Texas, flying east	Bell 206B Jetranger III	Dick Smith
1987	1987-04-28	First helicopter to the North Pole	Vancouver to North Pole	Bell 206B Jetranger III	Dick Smith
1989	1989-08-17	England to Australia, non-stop	London Heathrow Airport to Sydney Airport	Boeing 747-438	David Massy-Greene; George Lindeman
1989	1989-11-11	Circumnavigation of Earth, solo, female	Sydney to Sydney, flying east	Piper Saratoga	Gaby Kennard
1996	1996-05-19	Space flight	Kennedy Space Center to Shuttle Landing Facility, STS-77	Space Shuttle Endeavour	Andrew Thomas
2013	2013-09-07	Circumnavigation of Earth, solo, teenager	Wollongong to Wollongong, flying east	Cirrus SR22	Ryan Campbell

== National ==
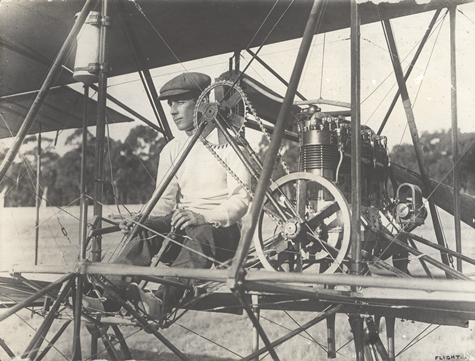
John Robertson Duigan at the Controls of his Biplane, Bendigo Racecourse, Victoria, 3 May 1911

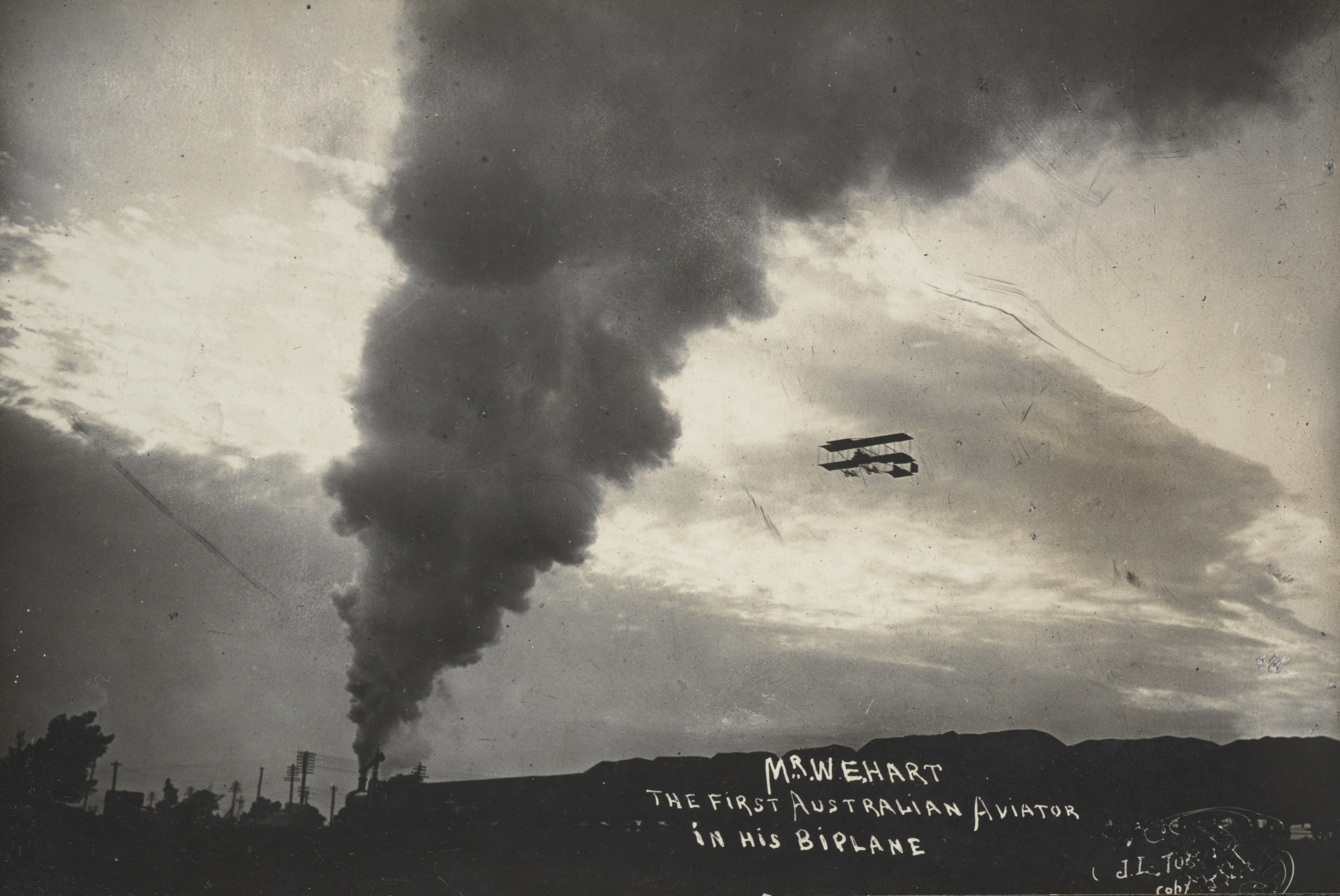
William Ewart Hart in his Bristol Boxkite Biplane. 1912.

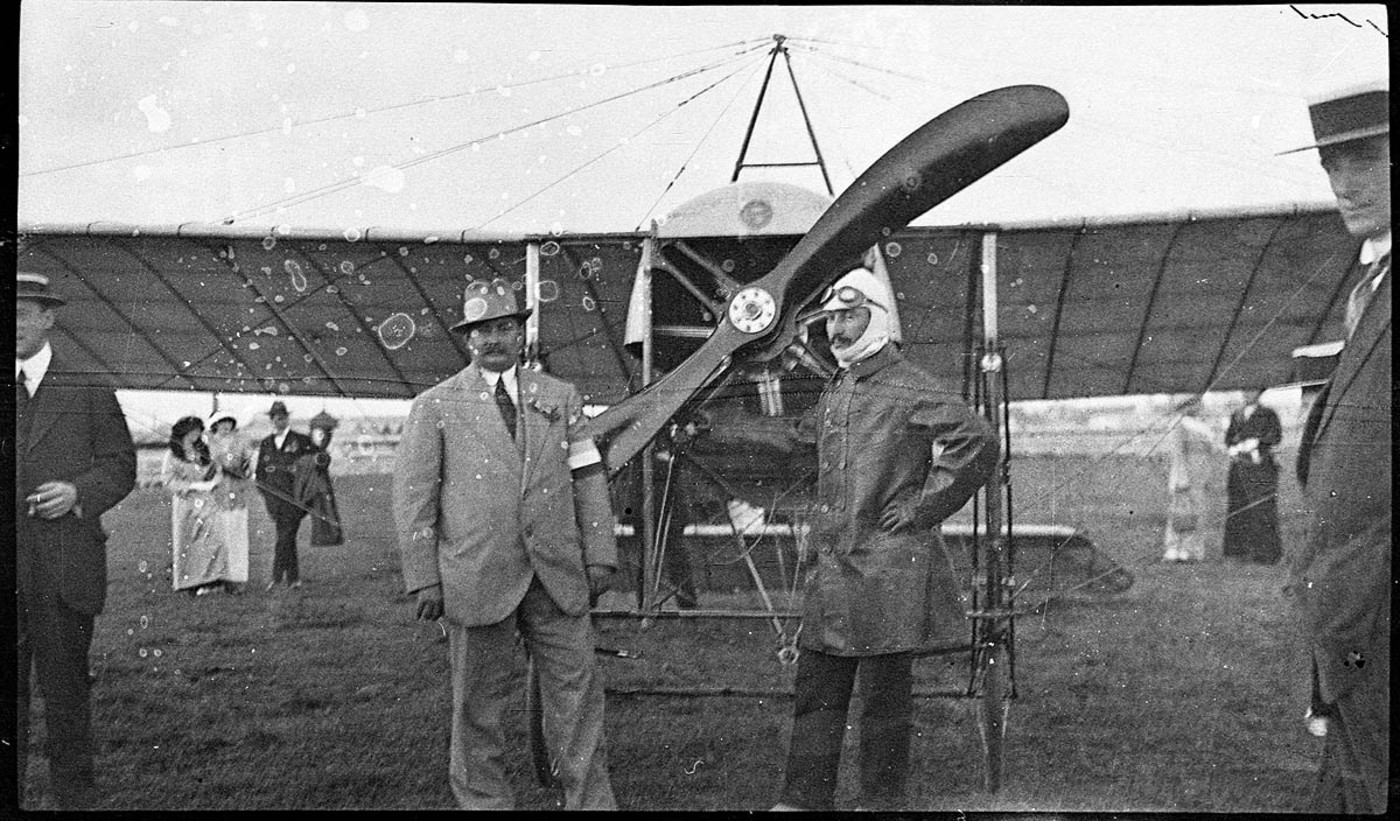
Maurice Guillaux and his Bleriot XI monoplane after the first mail and cargo flight Melbourne-Sydney. 1914-07-18

Year	Date	Event	Location	Machine	Aviator(s)
1858	1858-02-01	Balloon flight	Richmond, Victoria	"Australasian" Balloon	Joseph Dean
1879	1879-04-14	Parachute descent (of balloon and pilot)	Melbourne	"Aurora" Balloon	Henri L'Estrange
1888	1888-12-08	Parachute descent	Ashfield, New South Wales	"Gem" Balloon	J.T. Williams
1890	1890-02-08	Parachute descent by a woman	Newcastle, New South Wales	"Australia" Balloon	Valerie Freitas (as "Valerie Van Tassell")
1894	1894-11-12	Unpowered flight using heavier-than-air device (kites)	Stanwell Park, New South Wales	Four box kites	Lawrence Hargrave
1909	1909-12-05	Flight of heavier-than-air machine (glider)	Narrabeen, New South Wales	Taylor Biplane Glider	George Augustine Taylor
1909	1909-12-09	Powered flight of heavier-than-air machine	Sydney	Wright Model A	Colin Defries
1910	1910-07-16	Flight of Australian-built plane	Mia Mia, Victoria	Duigan pusher biplane	John Duigan
1911	1911-12-05	First airman to qualify as pilot in Australia (Licence No. 1)	Sydney	Bristol Boxkite	William Ewart Hart
1912	1912-08-06	Military pilot	England	Deperdussin monoplane	Henry Petre
1914	1914-03-01	Military flight	Point Cook	Bristol Boxkite	Eric Harrison
1914	1914-05-11	Seaplane flight	Sydney	Maurice Farman "hydro-aeroplane"	Maurice Guillaux
1914	1914-07-18	Air mail	Melbourne to Sydney	Blériot XI	Maurice Guillaux
1919	1919-08-06	Air mail over-water flight (in Southern Hemisphere)	Adelaide to Minlaton	Avro 504	Harry Butler
1919	1919-11-16	Crossing of continent	Melbourne to Port Darwin	B.E.2e	Henry Wrigley and Arthur Murphy
1919	1919-12-16	Bass Strait	Stanley, Tasmania to Torquay, Victoria	Boulton Paul P.9	Arthur L. Long
1924	1924-05-19	Circumnavigation of continent	Point Cook, Victoria to St Kilda, Victoria, anti-clockwise	Fairey III floatplane	Ivor McIntyre, Stanley Goble
1928	1928-05-17	Royal Flying Doctor Service	Cloncurry, Queensland to Julia Creek, Queensland	de Havilland DH.50	Arthur Affleck
1934	1934-10-01	Autogyro flight	Essendon Aerodrome	Cierva	Douglas Robertson
1937	1937-11-21	Parachute descent by female	Essendon	Airco DH.4	Jean Burns

== Regional ==
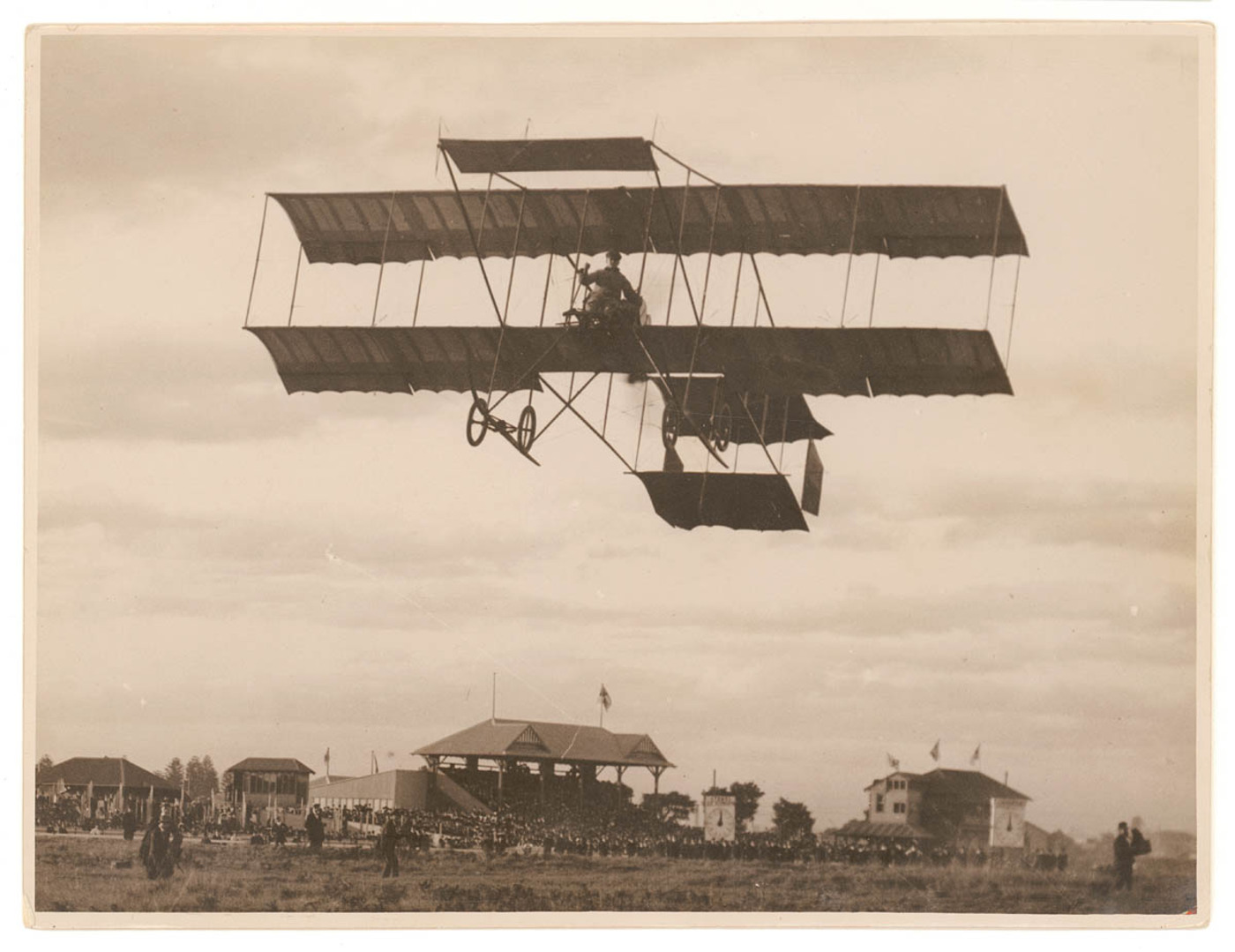
Joseph Joel Hammond flying his Bristol Boxkite at Ascot Racecourse (Mascot, NSW) April 1911.

Year	Date	State	Event	Location	Machine	Aviator(s)
1910	1910-03-12/3	SA	First flight in South Australia	Bolivar, South Australia	Bleriot monoplane	Carl William 'Bill' Wittber
1910	1910-03-17	SA	First controlled flight in South Australia	Bolivar, South Australia	Bleriot monoplane	Fred Custance
1910	1910-03-18	Vic	Flight at Diggers Rest	Diggers Rest, Victoria	Voisin biplane	Harry Houdini
1911	1911-04-18	NSW	Flight at Sydney Airport (site)	Sydney Airport	Bristol Boxkite	Joseph Joel Hammond
1931	1931-04-01	NSW	Flight at Lord Howe Island	Lord Howe Island	Gypsy Moth seaplane	Francis Chichester

== Images ==
- E.A Crome collection of photographs on aviation at National Library of Australia
- Horrie Miller aviation photograph collection at National Library of Australia
- Sam Hood collection of photographs (including aviation) at Mitchell Library of State Library of New South Wales

== See also ==
- List of Bass Strait crossings by air
- List of circumnavigations
- List of firsts in aviation
- Oswald Watt Gold Medal
