= Transatlantic flight =

Flight of an aircraft across the Atlantic Ocean

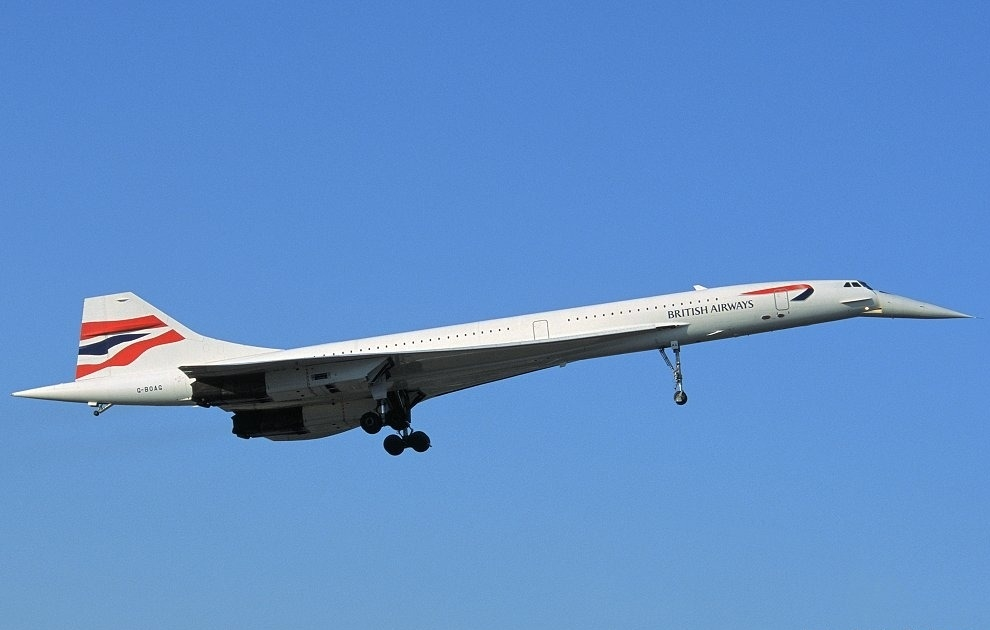
Concorde achieved transatlantic passenger crossings in record time.

A transatlantic flight (TATL) is the flight of an aircraft across the Atlantic Ocean from Europe, Africa, South Asia, or the Middle East to North America, South America, or vice versa. Such flights have been made by fixed-wing aircraft, airships, balloons and other aircraft. The distance of contemporary flights varies between 3,000 km (East Canada to Ireland) to 15,000 km (New York to Singapore.)

Early aircraft engines had neither the reliability nor the power to lift the required fuel to support transatlantic flight. There were difficulties navigating over the featureless expanse of water for thousands of kilometres, and the weather, especially in the North Atlantic, is unpredictable. Since the middle of the 20th century, however, transatlantic flight has become routine, for commercial, military, diplomatic, and other purposes. Journey times between North America and Europe have reduced from several days by ship to several hours by jet airliner.

The modern commercial market is particularly strong on routes between North America and the larger European economies, including 3 million annual passengers between the global cities of New York and London. Growing demand for transatlantic flights in the post-war era inspired the Concorde supersonic airliner. Introduced in 1976, the Concorde served transatlantic routes in under 3 hours.

== History ==
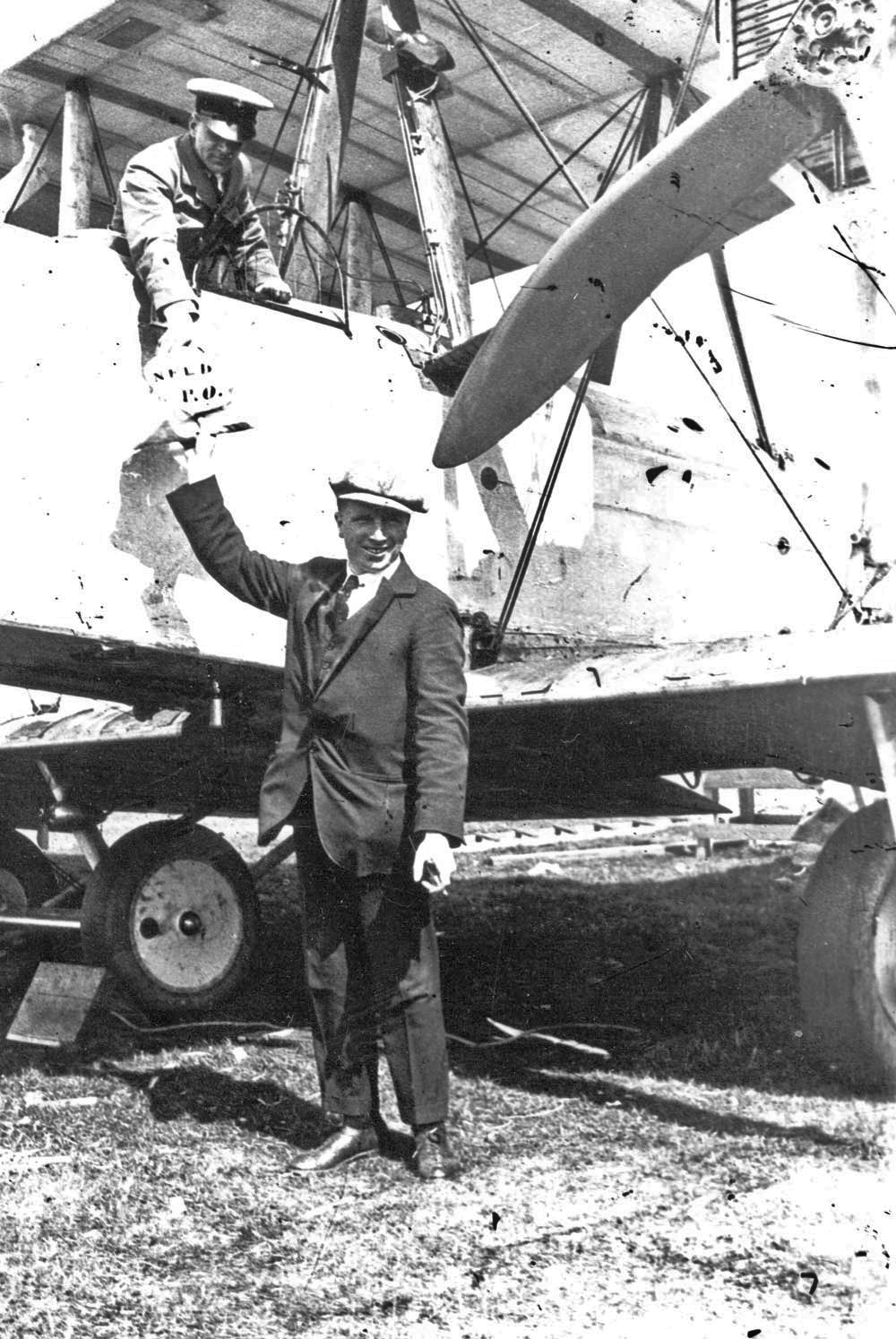
Royal Air Force officers, Alcock and Brown, taking on mail prior to the first non-stop transatlantic flight in 1919

The idea of transatlantic flight came about with the advent of the hot air balloon. The balloons of the period were inflated with coal gas, a moderate lifting medium compared to hydrogen or helium, but with enough lift to use the winds that would later be known as the Jet Stream. In 1859, John Wise built an enormous aerostat named the Atlantic, intending to cross the Atlantic. The flight lasted less than a day, crash-landing in Henderson, New York. Thaddeus S. C. Lowe prepared a massive balloon of 725,000 cubic feet (20,500 m^{3}) called the City of New York to take off from Philadelphia in 1860, but was interrupted by the onset of the American Civil War in 1861.

Powered by two Rolls-Royce Eagle 360 hp engines, the Vickers Vimy flown by British aviators Alcock and Brown made the first non-stop transatlantic flight in 1919. The first transatlantic flight by rigid airship, and the first return transatlantic flight, was made on 2 July 1919. The first successful transatlantic flight in a balloon was the Double Eagle II from Presque Isle, Maine, to Miserey, near Paris in 1978.

=== First transatlantic flights ===
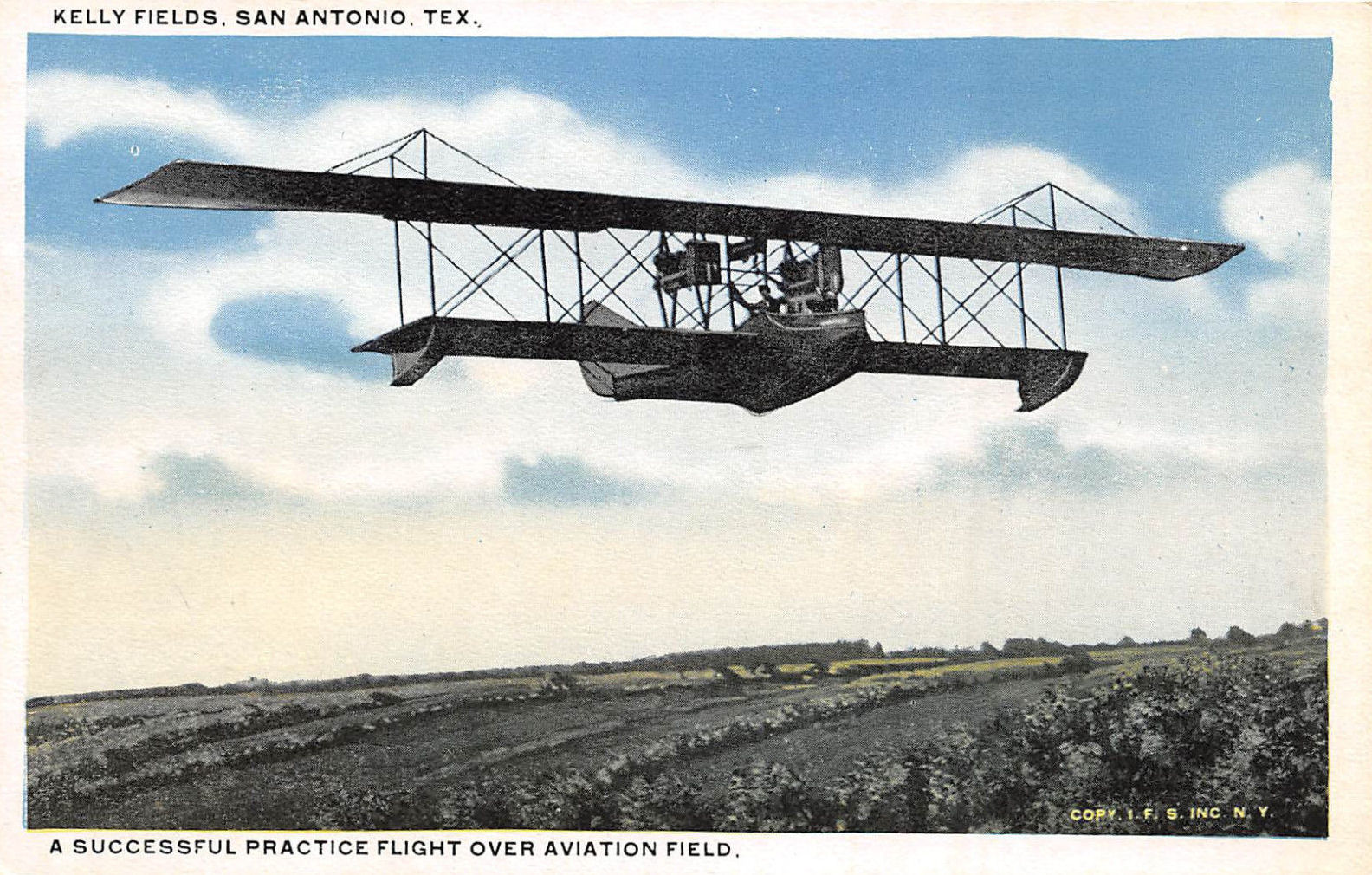
The Curtiss H-2 America was supposed to make a trans-atlantic flight attempt in 1914 but WW1 broke out. At one point the aircraft had three engines, one on the top wing, to build duration. The plane could not take off fully fueled with three engines.

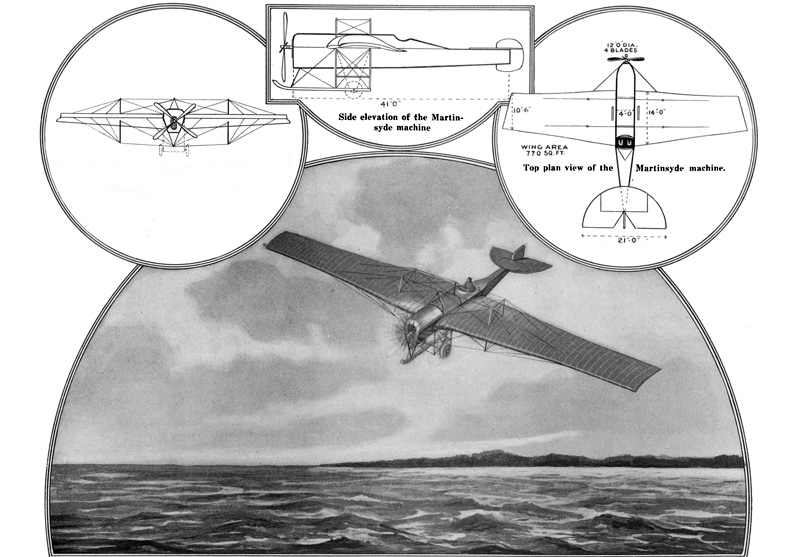
Martin-Handasyde monoplane to have been used by Gustav Hamel in an east-to-west Atlantic attempt. Hamel disappeared in May 1914 and the large monoplane partially built was never completed.

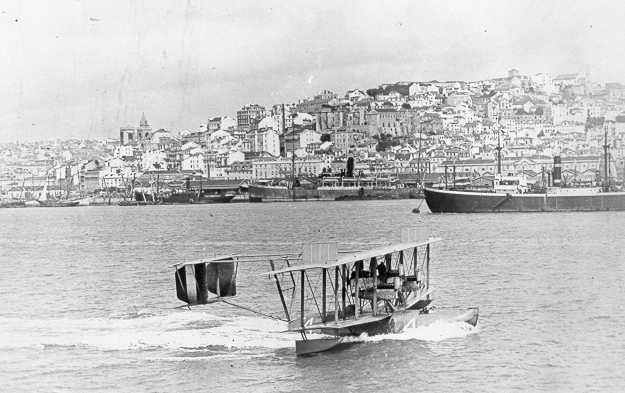
The U.S. Navy's NC-4, first aircraft to cross the Atlantic though in stages May 1919.

In April 1913, the London newspaper The Daily Mail offered a prize of £10,000 (£585,000 in 2024) to

the aviator who shall first cross the Atlantic in an aeroplane in flight from any point in the United States of America, Canada or Newfoundland and any point in Great Britain or Ireland" in 72 continuous hours.

The competition was suspended with the outbreak of World War I in 1914 but reopened after Armistice was declared in 1918. The war saw tremendous advances in aerial capabilities, and a real possibility of transatlantic flight by aircraft emerged.

Between 8 and 31 May 1919, the Curtiss seaplane NC-4 made a crossing of the Atlantic flying from the U.S. to Newfoundland, then to the Azores, and on to mainland Portugal and finally the United Kingdom. The whole journey took 23 days, with six stops along the way. A trail of 53 "station ships" across the Atlantic gave the aircraft points to navigate by. This flight was not eligible for the Daily Mail prize since it took more than 72 consecutive hours and also because more than one aircraft was used in the attempt.

Four teams were competing for the first non-stop flight across the Atlantic. They were Australian pilot Harry Hawker with observer Kenneth Mackenzie-Grieve in a single-engine Sopwith Atlantic; Frederick Raynham and C. W. F. Morgan in a Martinsyde; the Handley Page Group, led by Admiral Mark Kerr; and the Vickers entry John Alcock and Arthur Whitten Brown. Each group had to ship its aircraft to Newfoundland and make a rough field for the takeoff.

Hawker and Mackenzie-Grieve made the first attempt on 18 May, but engine failure brought them down into the ocean where they were rescued. Raynham and Morgan also attempted on 18 May but crashed on takeoff due to the high fuel load. The Handley Page team was in the final stages of testing its aircraft for the flight in June, but the Vickers group was ready earlier.

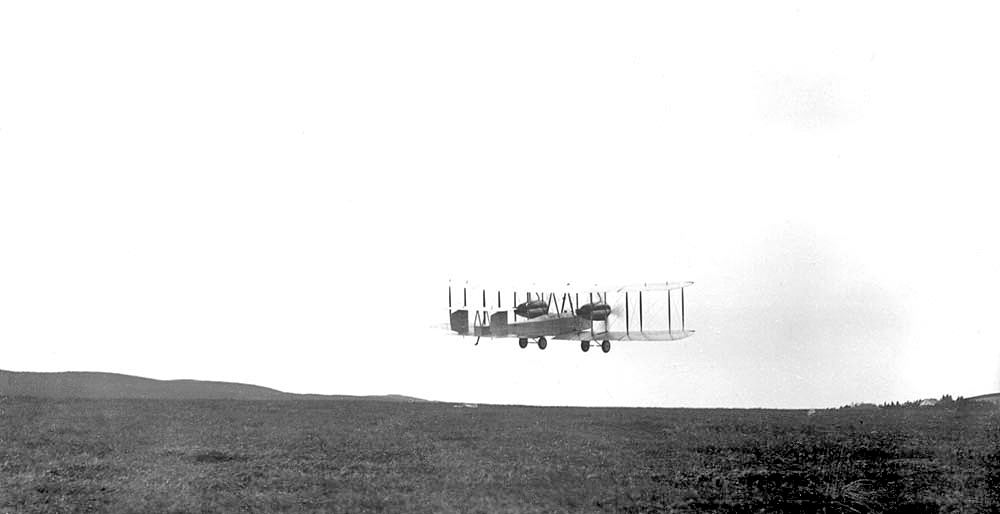
Alcock and Brown made the first non-stop transatlantic flight in June 1919. They took off from St John's, Newfoundland, and landed in Clifden, County Galway, Ireland.

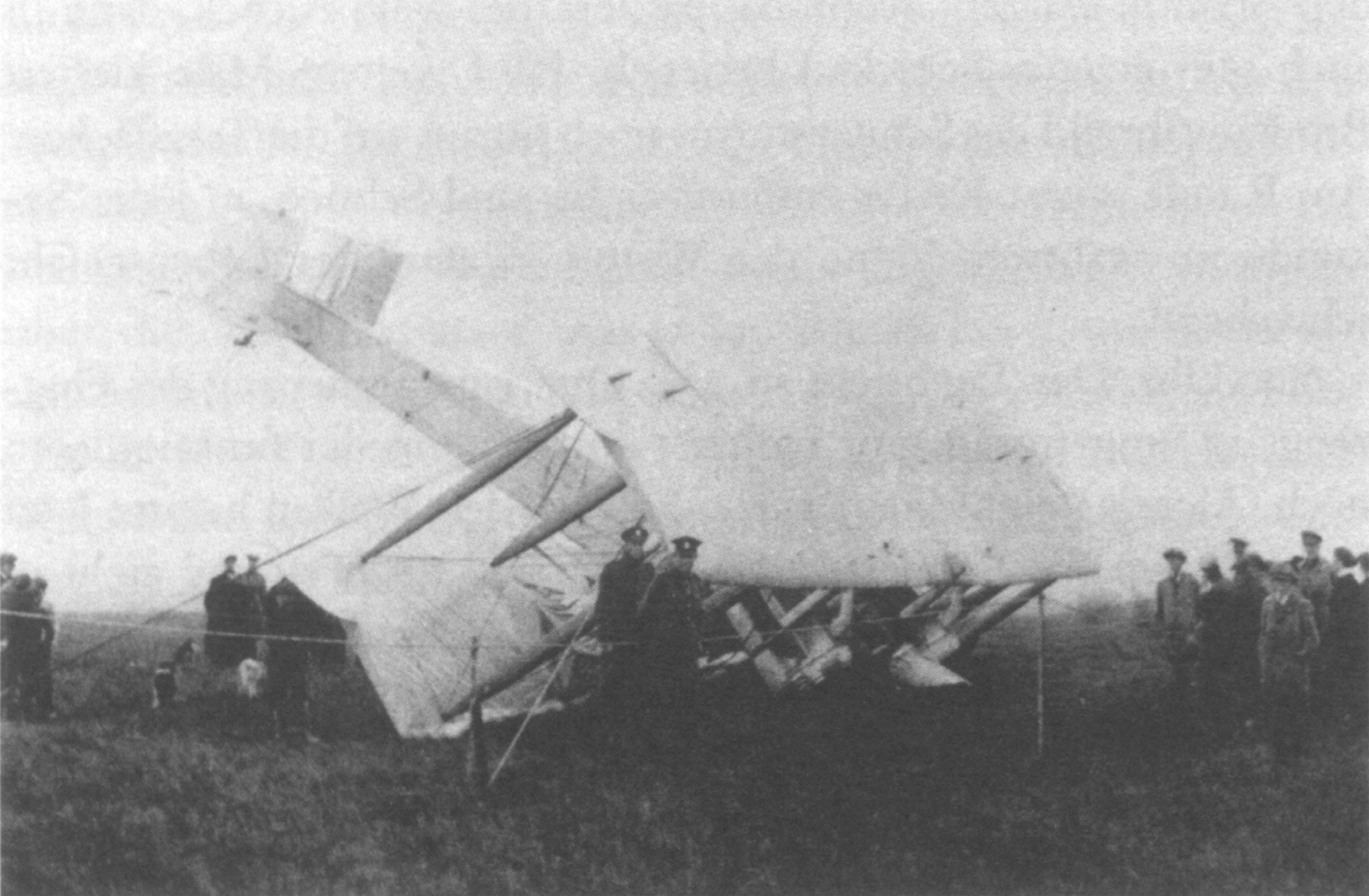
The plane of Alcock and Brown having landed in Ireland. While the touchdown had been smooth, the plane had landed on a peat bog and not grass as Alcock had thought, and as the plane ran on it eventually sank axle-deep, pivoting over its wheels.

During 14–15 June 1919, the British aviators Alcock and Brown made the first non-stop transatlantic flight. During the War, Alcock resolved to fly the Atlantic, and after the war, he approached the Vickers engineering and aviation firm at Weybridge, which had considered entering its Vickers Vimy IV twin-engined bomber in the competition but had not yet found a pilot. Alcock's enthusiasm impressed Vickers's team, and he was appointed as its pilot. Work began on converting the Vimy for the long flight, replacing its bomb racks with extra petrol tanks. Shortly afterwards Brown, who was unemployed, approached Vickers seeking a post and his knowledge of long-distance navigation convinced them to take him on as Alcock's navigator.

Vickers's team quickly assembled its plane and at around 1:45 p.m. on 14 June, while the Handley Page team was conducting yet another test, the Vickers plane took off from Lester's Field, in St John's, Newfoundland.

Alcock and Brown flew the modified Vickers Vimy, powered by two Rolls-Royce Eagle 360 hp engines. It was not an easy flight, with unexpected fog, and a snow storm almost causing the crewmen to crash into the sea. Their altitude varied between sea level and 12,000 feet (3,700 m) and upon takeoff, they carried 865 imperial gallons (3,900 L) of fuel. They made landfall in Clifden, County Galway at 8:40 a.m. on 15 June 1919, not far from their intended landing place, after less than sixteen hours of flying.

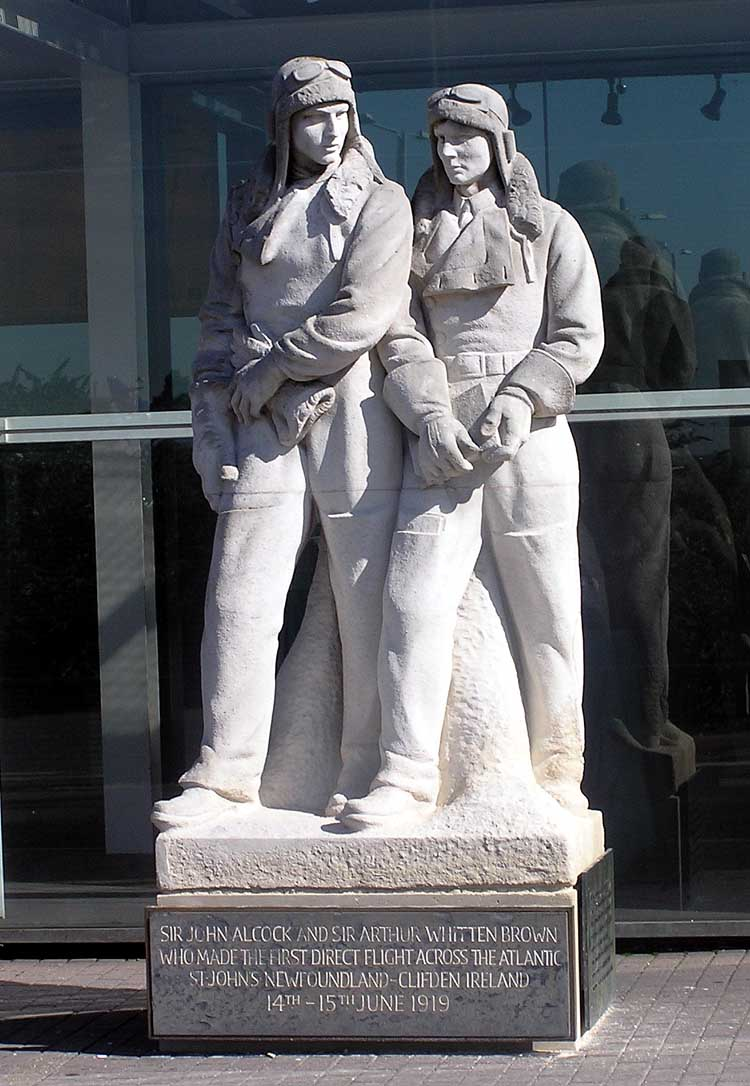
Statue of Alcock and Brown at London Heathrow Airport

The Secretary of State for Air, Winston Churchill, presented Alcock and Brown with the Daily Mail prize for the first crossing of the Atlantic Ocean in "less than 72 consecutive hours". There was a small amount of mail (3lb) carried on the flight making it also the first transatlantic airmail flight. The two aviators were knighted one week later by King George V at Windsor Castle.

The first transatlantic flight by rigid airship, and the first return transatlantic flight, was made just a couple of weeks after the transatlantic flight of Alcock and Brown, on 2 July 1919. Major George Herbert Scott of the Royal Air Force flew the airship R34 with his crew and passengers from RAF East Fortune, Scotland to Mineola, New York (on Long Island), covering a distance of about 3,000 miles (4,800 km) in about four and a half days.

The flight was intended as a testing ground for postwar commercial services by airship (see Imperial Airship Scheme), and it was the first flight to transport paying passengers. The R34 wasn't built as a passenger carrier, so extra accommodations were arranged by slinging hammocks in the keel walkway. The return journey to Pulham in Norfolk, was from 10 to 13 July over some 75 hours.

The first aerial crossing of the South Atlantic was made by the Portuguese naval aviators Gago Coutinho and Sacadura Cabral in 1922. Coutinho and Cabral flew from Lisbon, Portugal, to Rio de Janeiro, Brazil in stages, using three different Fairey III biplanes, and they covered a distance of 8,383 kilometres (5,209 mi) between 30 March and 17 June.

The first transatlantic flight between Spain and South America was completed in January 1926 with a crew of Spanish aviators on board Plus Ultra, a Dornier Do J flying boat; the crew was the captain Ramón Franco, co-pilot Julio Ruiz de Alda Miqueleiz, Teniente de Navio (Navy Lieutenant), Juan Manuel Durán, and Pablo Rada.

The first transpolar flight eastbound and the first flight crossing the North Pole ever was the airship carrying Norwegian explorer and pilot Roald Amundsen on 11 May 1926. He flew with the airship "NORGE" ("Norway") piloted by the Italian colonel Umberto Nobile, non-stop from Svalbard, Norway to Teller, Alaska, USA. The flight lasted for 72 hours.

The first night-time crossing of the South Atlantic was accomplished on 16–17 April 1927 by the Portuguese aviators Sarmento de Beires, Jorge de Castilho and Manuel Gouveia, flying from the Bijagós Archipelago, Portuguese Guinea, to Fernando de Noronha, Brazil in the Argos, a Dornier Wal flying boat.

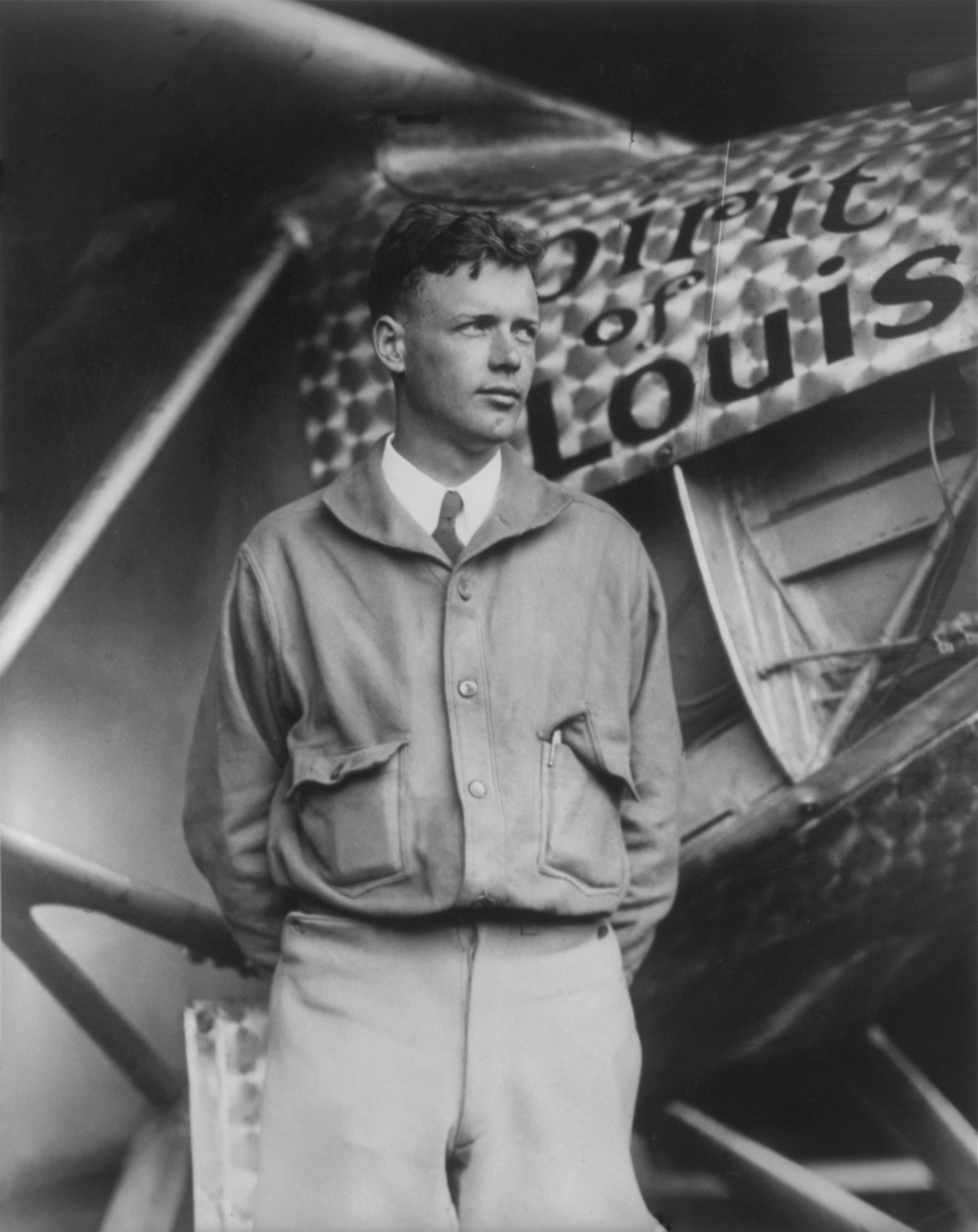
Charles Lindbergh with the Spirit of St. Louis – 1927.

In the early morning of 20 May 1927, Charles Lindbergh took off from Roosevelt Field, Mineola, New York, on his successful attempt to fly nonstop from New York to the European continental land mass. Over the next 33.5 hours, Lindbergh and the Spirit of St. Louis encountered many challenges before landing at Le Bourget Airport near Paris, at 10:22 p.m. on 21 May 1927, completing the first solo crossing of the Atlantic.

The first east-west non-stop transatlantic crossing by an aeroplane was made in 1928 by the Bremen, a German Junkers W33 type aircraft, from Baldonnel Airfield in County Dublin, Ireland.

On 18 August 1932 Jim Mollison made the first east-to-west solo trans-Atlantic flight; flying from Portmarnock in Ireland to Pennfield, New Brunswick, Canada in a de Havilland Puss Moth.

In 1936 the first woman aviator to cross the Atlantic east to west, and the first person to fly solo from England to North America, was Beryl Markham. She wrote about her adventures in her memoir, West with the Night.

The first transpolar transatlantic (and transcontinental) crossing was the non-stop flight piloted by the crew led by Valery Chkalov covering some 8,811 kilometres (5,475 mi) over 63 hours from Moscow, Russia to Vancouver, Washington from 18–20 June 1937.

=== Commercial airship flights ===
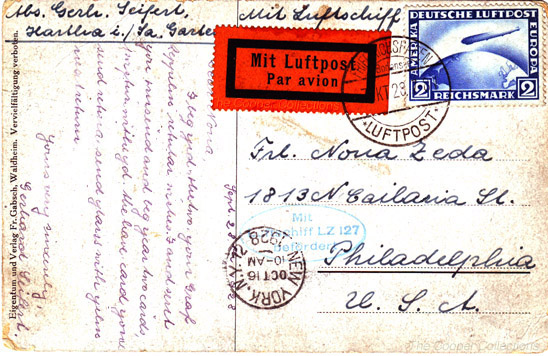
Flown picture postcard from the "First North American Flight" of the D-LZ127 (1928)

Following earlier irregular flights carrying commercial mail such as the flight of the USS Los Angeles (ZR-3) from Germany to the USA in October 1924, on 11 October 1928 Hugo Eckener commanding the airship Graf Zeppelin as part of DELAG's operations began the first non-stop transatlantic passenger flights, leaving Friedrichshafen, Germany, at 07:54 on 11 October 1928, and arriving at NAS Lakehurst, New Jersey, on 15 October.

Thereafter, DELAG used the Graf Zeppelin on regularly scheduled passenger flights across the North Atlantic, from Frankfurt-am-Main to Lakehurst. In the summer of 1931, a South Atlantic route was introduced, from Frankfurt and Friedrichshafen to Recife and Rio de Janeiro. Between 1931 and 1937 the Graf Zeppelin crossed the South Atlantic 136 times.

The British rigid airship R100 made a successful return trip from Cardington to Montreal in July–August 1930, in what was intended to be a proving flight for regularly scheduled passenger services. Following the R101 disaster in October 1930, the British rigid airship program was abandoned and the R100 scrapped, leaving DELAG as the sole remaining operator of transatlantic passenger airship flights.

In 1936 DELAG began passenger flights with LZ 129 Hindenburg, and made 36 Atlantic crossings (North and South). The first passenger trip across the North Atlantic left Friedrichshafen on 6 May with 56 crew and 50 passengers, arriving at Lakehurst on 9 May. The fare was $400 one way; the ten westward trips that season took 53 to 78 hours and eastward took 43 to 61 hours. The last eastward trip of the year left Lakehurst on 10 October; the first North Atlantic trip of 1937 ended in the Hindenburg disaster.

=== Commercial aeroplane service attempts ===
It would take two more decades after Alcock and Brown's first nonstop flight across the Atlantic in 1919 before commercial airplane flights became practical. The North Atlantic presented severe challenges for aviators due to weather and the long distances involved, with few stopping points. Initial transatlantic services, therefore, focused on the South Atlantic, where some French, German, and Italian airlines offered seaplane service for mail between South America and West Africa in the 1930s.

Between February 1934 and August 1939 Lufthansa operated a regular airmail service between Natal, Brazil, and Bathurst, Gambia, continuing via the Canary Islands and Spain to Stuttgart, Germany. From December 1935, Air France opened a regular weekly airmail route between South America and Africa. German airlines experimented with mail routes over the North Atlantic in the early 1930s, with flying boats and dirigibles.

In August 1938 a Deutsche Luft Hansa Focke-Wulf Fw 200 Condor long-range airliner flew non-stop from Berlin to New York and returned non-stop as a proving flight for the development of passenger-carrying services. This was the first landplane to fulfil this function and marked a departure from the British and American reliance on flying boats for long over-water routes. Operators of the Fw 200 focussed on other routes, though.

==== Flying boats ====
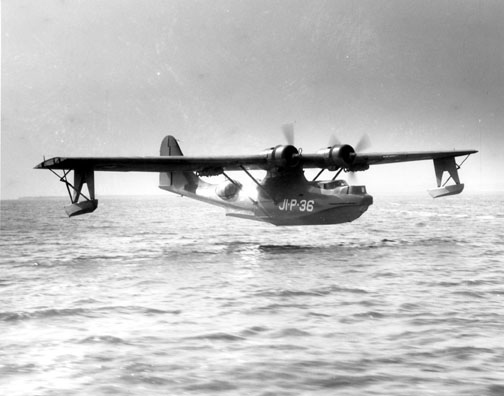
Flying boats were used for transatlantic flights in the 1930s

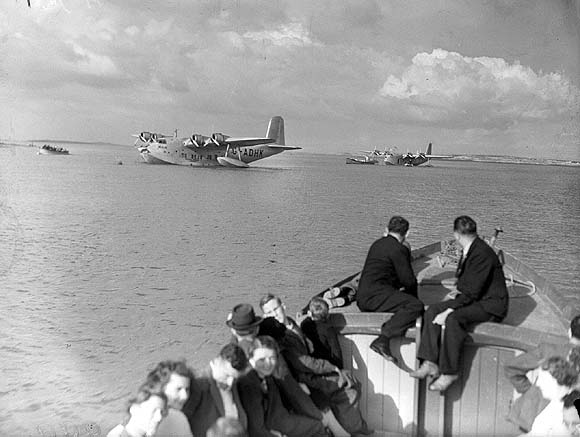
Foynes, Ireland was the European terminus for all transatlantic flying boat flights in the 1930s.

In the 1930s a flying boat route was the only practical means of transatlantic air travel, as land-based aircraft lacked sufficient range for the crossing. An agreement between the governments of the US, Britain, Canada, and the Irish Free State in 1935 set aside the Irish town of Foynes, the most westerly port in Ireland, as the terminal for all such services to be established.

Imperial Airways had bought the Short Empire flying boat, primarily for use along the empire routes to Africa, Asia and Australia, and had established an international airport on Darrell's Island, in the Imperial fortress colony of Bermuda (640 miles off Cape Hatteras, North Carolina), which began serving both Imperial Airways, subsequently renamed British Overseas Airways Corporation (BOAC) and Pan American World Airways (PAA) flights from the United States in 1936, but began exploring the possibility of using it for transatlantic flights from 1937. PAA would begin scheduled trans-Atlantic flights via Bermuda before Imperial Airways did, enabling the United States Government to covertly assist the British Government before the United States entry into the Second World War as mail was taken off trans-Atlantic PAA flights by the Imperial Censorship of British Security Co-ordination to search for secret communications from Axis spies operating in the United States, including the Joe K ring, with information gained being shared with the Federal Bureau of Investigation. The range of the Short Empire flying boat was less than that of the equivalent US Sikorsky "Clipper" flying boats and as such was initially unable to provide a true trans-Atlantic service.

Two flying boats (Caledonia and Cambria) were lightened and given long-range tanks to increase the aircraft's range to 3,300 miles (5,300 km).

In the US, attention was at first focused on transatlantic flights for a faster postal service between Europe and the United States. In 1931 W. Irving Glover, the second assistant postmaster, wrote an article for Popular Mechanics on the challenges and the need for a regular service. In the 1930s, under the direction of Juan Trippe, Pan American began to get interested in the feasibility of a transatlantic passenger service using flying boats.

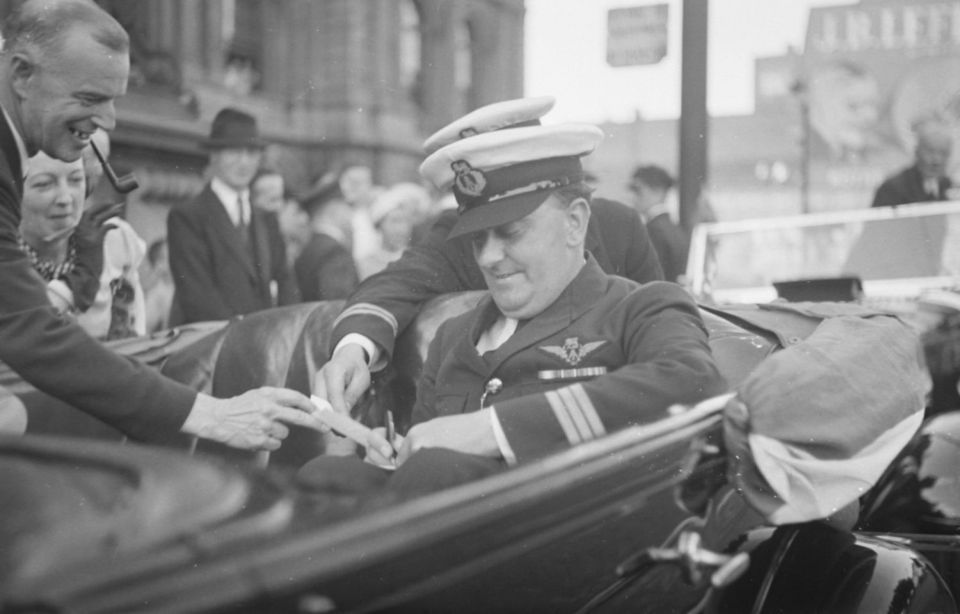
Captain Wilcockson signing an autograph for one of his admirers, in July 1937, near Montreal, Quebec.

On 5 July 1937, A.S. Wilcockson flew a Short Empire for Imperial Airways from Foynes to Botwood, Newfoundland and Harold Gray piloted a Sikorsky S-42 for Pan American in the opposite direction. Both flights were a success and both airlines made a series of subsequent proving flights that same year to test out a variety of different weather conditions. Air France also became interested and began experimental flights in 1938.

As the Short Empire only had enough range with enlarged fuel tanks at the expense of a passenger room, several pioneering experiments were done with the aircraft to work around the problem. It was known that aircraft could maintain flight with a greater load than is possible to take off with, so Major Robert H. Mayo, Technical general manager at Imperial Airways, proposed mounting a small, long-range seaplane on top of a larger carrier aircraft, using the combined power of both to bring the smaller aircraft to operational height, at which time the two aircraft would separate, the carrier aircraft returning to base while the other flew on to its destination.

The Short Mayo Composite project, co-designed by Mayo and Shorts chief designer Arthur Gouge, comprised the Short S.21 Maia, (G-ADHK) which was a variant of the Short "C-Class" Empire flying-boat fitted with a trestle or pylon on the top of the fuselage to support the Short S.20 Mercury(G-ADHJ).

The first successful in-flight separation of the Composite was carried out on 6 February 1938, and the first transatlantic flight was made on 21 July 1938 from Foynes to Boucherville. Mercury, piloted by Captain Don Bennett, separated from her carrier at 8 pm to continue what was to become the first commercial non-stop east-to-west transatlantic flight by a heavier-than-air machine. This initial journey took 20 hrs, 21 min at an average ground speed of 144 miles per hour (232 km/h).

Another technology developed for transatlantic commercial flight was aerial refuelling. Sir Alan Cobham developed the Grappled-line looped-hose system to stimulate the possibility for long-range transoceanic commercial aircraft flights, and publicly demonstrated it for the first time in 1935. In the system, the receiver aircraft trailed a steel cable which was then grappled by a line shot from the tanker. The line was then drawn back into the tanker where the receiver's cable was connected to the refueling hose. The receiver could then haul back in its cable bringing the hose to it. Once the hose was connected, the tanker climbed sufficiently above the receiver aircraft to allow the fuel to flow under gravity.

Cobham founded Flight Refuelling Ltd in 1934 and by 1938 had demonstrated the FRL's looped-hose system to refuel the Short Empire flying boat Cambria from an Armstrong Whitworth AW.23. Handley Page Harrows were used in the 1939 trials to aerial refuel the Empire flying boats for regular transatlantic crossings. From 5 August – 1 October 1939, sixteen crossings of the Atlantic were made by Empire flying boats, with 15 crossings using FRL's aerial refuelling system. After the 16 crossings more trials were suspended due to the outbreak of World War II.

The Short S.26 was built in 1939 as an enlarged Short Empire, powered by four 1,400 hp (1,044 kW) Bristol Hercules sleeve valve radial engines and designed with the capability of crossing the Atlantic without refuelling. It was intended to form the backbone of Imperial Airways' Empire services. It could fly 6,000 miles (9,700 km) unburdened, or 150 passengers for a "short hop". On 21 July 1939, the first aircraft, (G-AFCI "Golden Hind"), was first flown at Rochester by Shorts' chief test pilot, John Lankester Parker. Although two aircraft were handed over to Imperial Airways for crew training, all three were impressed (along with their crews) into the RAF before they could begin civilian operation with the onset of World War II.

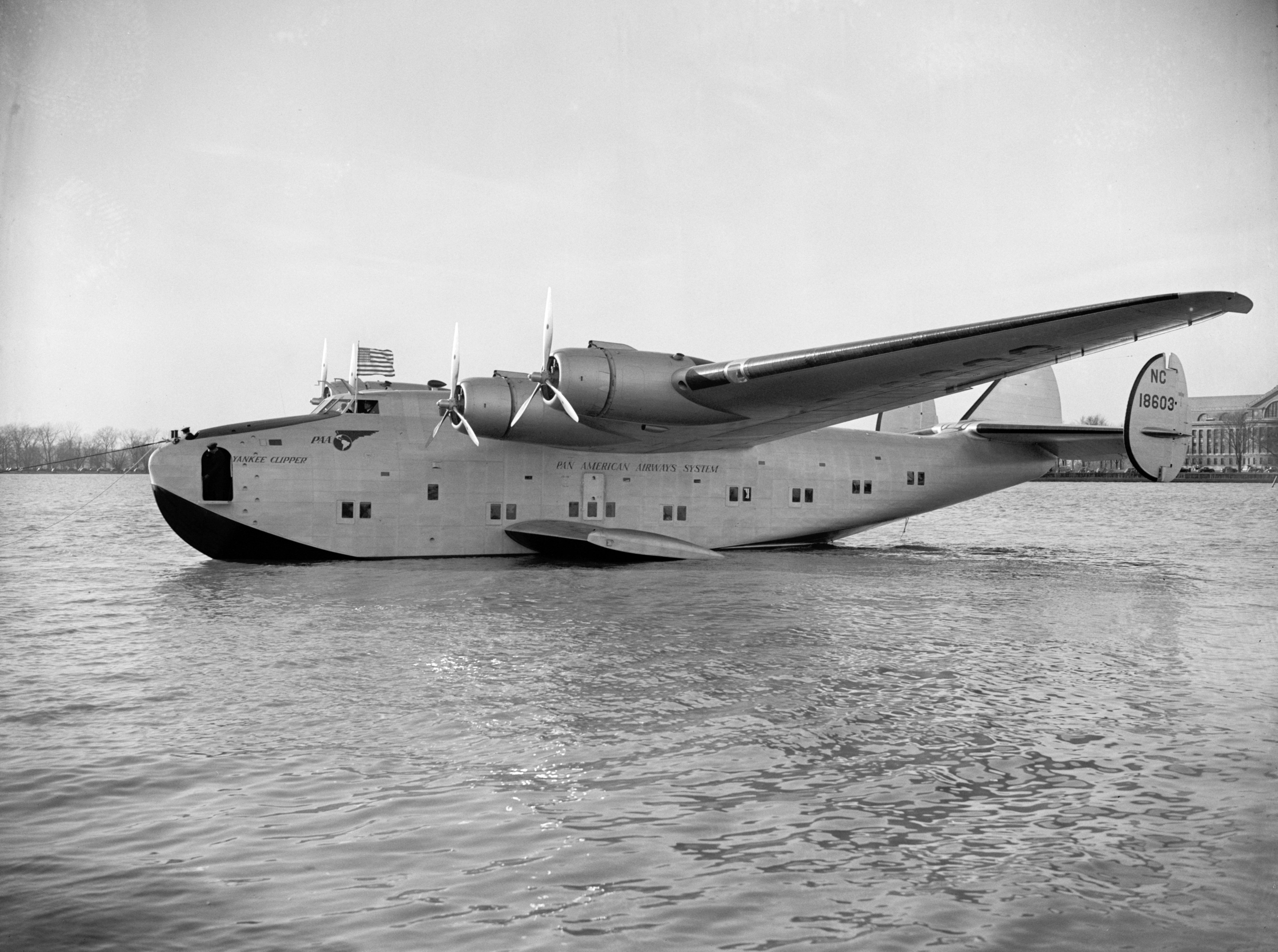
The Yankee Clipper in 1939.

Meanwhile, Pan Am bought nine Boeing 314 Clippers in 1939, a long-range flying boat capable of flying the Atlantic. The "Clippers" were built for "one-class" luxury air travel, a necessity given the long duration of transoceanic flights. The seats could be converted into 36 bunks for overnight accommodation; with a cruising speed of only 188 miles per hour (303 km/h). The 314s had a lounge and dining area, and the galleys were crewed by chefs from four-star hotels. Men and women were provided with separate dressing rooms, and white-coated stewards served five and six-course meals with gleaming silver service.

The Yankee Clipper's inaugural trip across the Atlantic was on 24 June 1939 between New York and Marseille. The second route started the following month from Southampton to Port Washington, New York with intermediate stops at Foynes, Ireland, Botwood, Newfoundland, and Shediac, New Brunswick. Its first passenger flight was on 9 July, and this continued only until the onset of the Second World War, less than two months later. The Clipper fleet was then pressed into military service and the flying boats were used for ferrying personnel and equipment to the European and Pacific fronts.

=== Maturation ===
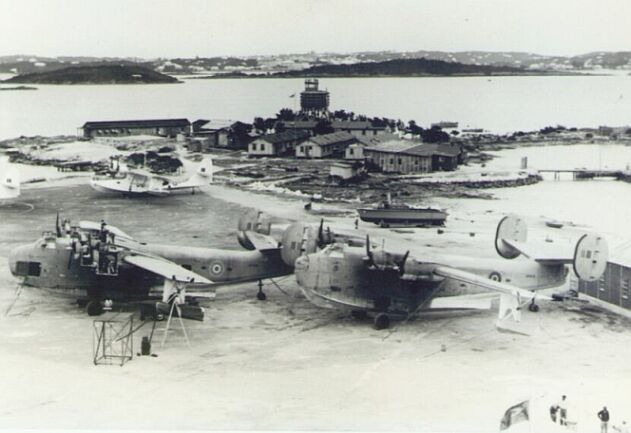
RAF Darrell's Island during World War II. This base was used throughout the war for trans-Atlantic ferrying of aircraft.

It was from the emergency exigencies of World War II that crossing the Atlantic by land-based aircraft became a practical and commonplace possibility. With the Fall of France in June 1940, and the loss of much war materiel on the continent, the need for the British to purchase replacement materiel from the United States was urgent. Airbases for refuelling were built in Greenland and Iceland, which were occupied by the United States after the German invasion of Denmark (1940).

The British and United States Governments hurried a secret agreement before Britain declared war on Germany in 1939 for the United States to establish a base in Bermuda. Ultimately, the agreement would be expanded to include a United States Naval Operating Base, containing a Naval Air Station serving anti-submarine flying boats, on the Great Sound (near to the Royal Naval Dockyard, Bermuda, Royal Naval Air Station Bermuda that had been operated for the Royal Navy with the rest of the Fleet Air Arm at its original location in HM Dockyard Bermuda until 1939 by the Royal Air Force, and the Darrell's Island airport, which the Royal Air Force took over for trans-Atlantic ferrying of flying boats such as the Catalinas, which were flown there from United States factories to be tested before acceptance by the Air Ministry and delivery across the Atlantic, usually on direct flights to Greenock, Scotland. RAF Transport Command flights, such as those flown by Coronados, also utilised the facility as BOAC and PAA continued to do) and Kindley Field, serving land planes, constructed by the United States Army for operation by the United States Army Air Forces, but to be used jointly by the Royal Air Force and Royal Navy. In January 1942, Prime Minister Winston Churchill visited Bermuda on his return to Britain, following December 1941 meetings in Washington D.C., with US President Franklin Roosevelt, in the weeks after the Japanese attack on Pearl Harbor. Churchill flew into Darrell's Island on the BOAC Boeing 314 Berwick. Although it had been planned to continue the journey aboard the battleship HMS Duke of York, he made an impulsive decision to complete it by a direct flight from Bermuda to Plymouth, England aboard Berwick, marking the first trans-Atlantic air crossing by a national leader. When the first runway at Kindley Field became operational in 1943, the Royal Navy Fleet Air Arm relocated Roc target tugs that had been operating on floats from RNAS Bermuda to the airfield to operate as land planes, and RAF Transport Command moved its operations there, leaving RAF Ferry Command at Darrell's Island.

The time it was taken for an aircraft – such as the Lockheed Hudson – bought in the United States, to be flown to Nova Scotia and Newfoundland, and then partially dis-assembled before being transported by ship to England, where it was re-assembled and subject to repairs of any damage sustained during shipment, could mean an aircraft could not enter service for several weeks. Further, German U-boats operating in the North Atlantic Ocean made it particularly hazardous for merchant ships between Newfoundland and Britain.

Larger aircraft could be flown directly to the UK and an organization was set up to manage this using civilian pilots. The program was begun by the Ministry of Aircraft Production. Its minister, Lord Beaverbrook a Canadian by origin, reached an agreement with Sir Edward Beatty, a friend and chairman of the Canadian Pacific Railway Company to provide ground facilities and support. Ministry of Aircraft Production would provide civilian crews and management and former RAF officer Don Bennett, a specialist in long-distance flying and later Air Vice Marshal and commander of the Pathfinder Force, led the first delivery flight in November 1940.

In 1941, MAP took the operation off CPR to put the whole operation under the Atlantic Ferry Organization ("Atfero"), which was set up by Morris W. Wilson, a banker in Montreal. Wilson hired civilian pilots to fly the aircraft to the UK. The pilots were then ferried back in converted RAF Liberators. "Atfero hired the pilots, planned the routes, selected the airports [and] set up weather and radiocommunication stations."

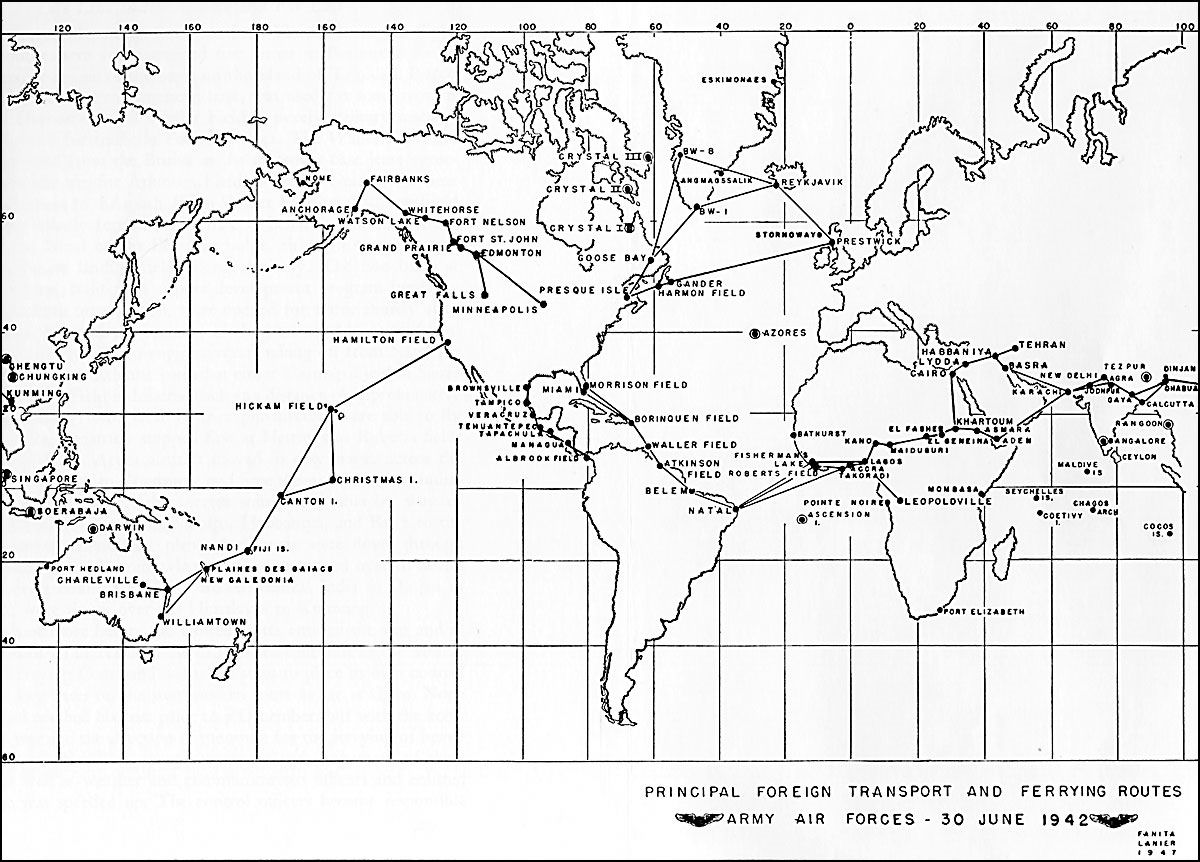
Major trunk air routes of AAF Ferrying Command, June 1942.

The organization was passed to the Air Ministry administration by retaining civilian pilots, some of whom were Americans, alongside RAF navigators and British radio operators. After completing delivery, crews were flown back to Canada for the next run. RAF Ferry Command was formed on 20 July 1941, by the raising of the RAF Atlantic Ferry Service to Command status. Its commander for its whole existence was Air Chief Marshal Sir Frederick Bowhill.

As its name suggests, the main function of Ferry Command was the ferrying of new aircraft from factory to operational unit. Ferry Command did this over only one area of the world, rather than the more general routes that Transport Command later developed. The Command's operational area was the North Atlantic, and its responsibility was to bring the larger aircraft that had the range to do the trip over the ocean from American and Canadian factories to the RAF home Commands.

With the entry of the United States into the War, the Atlantic Division of the United States Army Air Forces Air Transport Command began similar ferrying services to transport aircraft, supplies, and passengers to the British Isles.

By September 1944 British Overseas Airways Corporation (BOAC), as Imperial Airways had by then become, had made 1,000 transatlantic crossings.

After World War II long runways were available, and North American and European carriers such as Pan Am, TWA, Trans Canada Airlines (TCA), BOAC, and Air France acquired larger piston airliners that could cross the North Atlantic with stops (usually in Gander, Newfoundland and/or Shannon, Ireland). In January 1946 Pan Am's Douglas DC-4 was scheduled from New York (La Guardia) to London (Hurn) in 17 hours 40 minutes, five days a week; in June 1946 Lockheed L-049 Constellations had brought the eastward time to London Heathrow down to 15 hr 15 min.

To aid aircraft crossing the Atlantic, six nations grouped to divide the Atlantic into ten zones. Each zone had a letter and a vessel station in that zone, providing radio relays, radio navigation beacons, weather reports, and rescues if an aircraft went down. The six nations of the group split the cost of these vessels.

The September 1947 ABC Guide shows 27 passenger flights a week west across the North Atlantic to the US and Canada on BOAC and other European airlines and 151 flights every two weeks on Pan Am, AOA, TWA, and TCA, 15 flights a week to the Caribbean and South America, plus three a month on Iberia and a Latécoère 631 six-engine flying boat every two weeks to Fort de France.

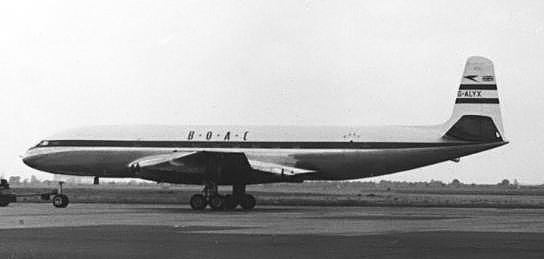
British Overseas Airways Corporation Comet 1 at London Heathrow in 1953

In May 1952, BOAC was the first airline to introduce a passenger jet, the de Havilland Comet, into airline service, operating on routes in Europe and beyond (but not transatlantic). All Comet 1 aircraft were grounded in April 1954 after four Comets crashed, the last two being BOAC aircraft which suffered catastrophic failure at altitude. Later jet airliners, including the larger and longer-range Comet 4, were designed so that in the event of for example a skin failure due to cracking the damage would be localized and not catastrophic.

On 4 October 1958, BOAC started the "first-ever transatlantic jet service" between London Heathrow and New York Idlewild with a Comet 4, and Pan Am followed on 26 October with a Boeing 707 service between New York and Paris.

Supersonic flights on Concorde were offered from 1976 to 2003, from London (by British Airways) and Paris (by Air France) to New York and Washington, and back, with one-way flight times of around 3 hours 30 minutes. Since the loosening of regulations in the 1970s and 1980s, many airlines now compete across the Atlantic.

=== Present day ===
In 2015, 44 million seats were offered on the transatlantic routes, an increase of 6% over the previous year. Of the 67 European airports with links to North America, the busiest was London Heathrow Airport with 231,532 weekly seats, followed by Paris Charles de Gaulle Airport with 129,831, Frankfurt Airport with 115,420, and Amsterdam Airport Schiphol with 79,611. Of the 45 airports in North America, the busiest linked to Europe was New York John F. Kennedy International Airport with 198,442 seats, followed by Toronto Pearson International Airport with 90,982, New York Newark Liberty International Airport with 79,107, and Chicago O'Hare International Airport with 75,391 seats.

Million seats offered
Airline	2005	2015	∆
Delta Air Lines	2.79	5.33	91%
British Airways	4.93	4.85	-2%
United Airlines	2.37	4.78	102%
Lufthansa	2.99	3.80	27%
American Airlines	2.87	2.84	-1%
Air Canada	1.78	2.76	55%
Air France	2.23	2.49	12%
Virgin Atlantic	1.84	2.38	29%
US Airways	1.13	1.75	55%
KLM	1.12	1.45	29%

Joint ventures, allowing coordination on prices, schedules, and strategy, control almost 75% of Transatlantic capacity. They are parallel to airline alliances: British Airways, Iberia and American Airlines are part of Oneworld; Lufthansa, Air Canada and United Airlines are members of Star Alliance; and Delta Air Lines, Air France, and KLM belong to SkyTeam. Low cost carriers are starting to compete on this market, most importantly Norse Atlantic Airways, WestJet and JetBlue. A total of 431 non-stop routes between North America and Europe were scheduled for summer 2017, up 84 routes from 347 in 2012 – a 24% increase.

In 2016 Dr. Paul Williams of the University of Reading published a scientific study showing that transatlantic flight times are expected to change as the North Atlantic jet stream responds to global warming, with eastbound flights speeding up and westbound flights slowing down.

In February 2017, Norwegian Air International announced it would start transatlantic flights to the United States from the United Kingdom and Ireland in the summer of 2017 on behalf of its parent company using the parent's new Boeing 737 MAX aircraft expected to be delivered from May 2017. Norwegian Air performed its first transatlantic flight with a Boeing 737-800 on 16 June 2017 between Edinburgh Airport and Stewart Airport, New York. The first transatlantic flight with a 737 MAX was performed on 15 July 2017, with a MAX 8 named Sir Freddie Laker, between Edinburgh Airport in Scotland and Hartford International Airport in the US state of Connecticut, followed by a second rotation from Edinburgh to Stewart Airport, New York.

Long-haul low-cost carriers are emerging on the transatlantic market with 545,000 seats offered over 60 city pairs in September 2017 (a 66% growth over one year), compared to 652,000 seats over 96 pairs for leisure airlines and 8,798,000 seats over 357 pairs for mainline carriers. LCC seats grew to 7.7% of North Atlantic seats in 2018 from 3.0% in 2016, led by Norwegian with 4.8% then WOW air with 1.6% and WestJet with 0.6%, while the three airline alliances dedicated joint ventures seat share is 72.3%, down from 79.8% in 2015. By July 2018, Norwegian became the largest European airline for New York, carrying 1.67 million passengers over a year, beating British Airways's 1.63 million, while the U.S. major carriers combined transported 26.1 million transatlantic passengers.

== Transatlantic routes ==
Unlike over land, transatlantic flights use standardized aircraft routes called North Atlantic Tracks (NATs). These change daily in position (although altitudes are standardized) to compensate for weather—particularly the jet stream tailwinds and headwinds, which may be substantial at cruising altitudes and have a strong influence on trip duration and fuel economy. Eastbound flights generally operate during night-time hours, while westbound flights generally operate during daytime hours, for passenger convenience. The eastbound flow, as it is called, generally makes European landfall from about 0600UT to 0900UT. The westbound flow generally operates within a 1200–1500UT time slot. Restrictions on how far a given aircraft may be from an airport also play a part in determining its route; in the past, airliners with three or more engines were not restricted, but a twin-engine airliner was required to stay within a certain distance of airports that could accommodate it (since a single engine failure in a four-engine aircraft is less crippling than a single engine failure in a twin). Modern aircraft with two engines flying transatlantic (the most common models used for transatlantic service being the Airbus A330, Airbus A350, Boeing 767, Boeing 777 and Boeing 787) have to be ETOPS certified.

North America-Western Europe
type	1H2006	1H2016
A310/DC10/MD11	3%	1%
A320/B737	1%	1%
A330	16%	26%
A340	10%	6%
A380	–	3%
B747	15%	9%
B757	6%	9%
B767	28%	19%
B777	21%	20%
B787	–	6%

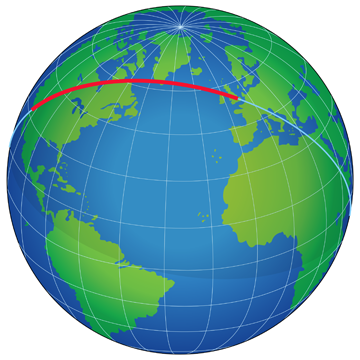
The shortest ways always are orthodromes (Los Angeles–London)

Gaps in air traffic control and radar coverage over large stretches of the Earth's oceans, as well as an absence of most types of radio navigation aids, impose a requirement for a high level of autonomy in navigation upon transatlantic flights. Aircraft must include reliable systems that can determine the aircraft's course and position with great accuracy over long distances. In addition to the traditional compass, inertials and satellite navigation systems such as GPS all have their place in transatlantic navigation. Land-based systems such as VOR and DME, because they operate "line of sight", are mostly useless for ocean crossings, except in initial and final legs within about 240 nautical miles (440 km) of those facilities. In the late 1950s and early 1960s an important facility for low-flying aircraft was the Radio Range. Inertial navigation systems became prominent in the 1970s.

=== Busiest transatlantic routes ===
The twenty busiest commercial routes between North America and Europe (traffic traveling in both directions) during June until August 2022 were:

Rank	North American Airport	European Airport	Scheduled Flight June-Aug 2022
1	John F. Kennedy International Airport, New York City, United States	Heathrow Airport, London, United Kingdom	1648
2	Newark Liberty International Airport, New York City, United States	Heathrow Airport, London, United Kingdom	863
3	Los Angeles International Airport, Los Angeles, United States	Heathrow Airport, London, United Kingdom	828
4	John F. Kennedy International Airport, New York City, United States	Charles de Gaulle Airport, Paris, France	825
5	O'Hare International Airport Chicago, United States	Heathrow Airport, London, United Kingdom	801
6	San Francisco International Airport, San Francisco, United States	Heathrow Airport, London, United Kingdom	617
7	Montréal–Pierre Elliott Trudeau International Airport, Montreal, Canada	Charles de Gaulle Airport, Paris, France	614
8	Logan International Airport, Boston, United States	Heathrow Airport, London, United Kingdom	598
9	Washington Dulles International Airport, Washington, D.C., United States	Heathrow Airport, London, United Kingdom	488
10	John F. Kennedy International Airport, New York City, United States	Leonardo da Vinci–Fiumicino Airport, Rome, Italy	460
11	John F. Kennedy International Airport, New York City, United States	Milan Malpensa Airport, Milan, Italy	460
12	Dallas Fort Worth International Airport, Dallas-Fort Worth, United States	Heathrow Airport, London, United Kingdom	447
13	Mexico City International Airport, Mexico City, Mexico	Adolfo Suárez Madrid–Barajas Airport, Madrid, Spain	445
14	John F. Kennedy International Airport, New York City, United States	Amsterdam Airport Schiphol, Amsterdam, Netherlands	439
15	John F. Kennedy International Airport, New York City, United States	Frankfurt Airport, Frankfurt am Main, Germany	433
16	John F. Kennedy International Airport, New York City, United States	Adolfo Suárez Madrid–Barajas Airport, Madrid, Spain	430
17	Los Angeles International Airport, Los Angeles, United States	Charles de Gaulle Airport, Paris, France	416
18	Toronto Pearson International Airport, Malton, Canada	Heathrow Airport, London, United Kingdom	408
19	Hartsfield–Jackson Atlanta International Airport, Atlanta, United States	Charles de Gaulle Airport, Paris, France	369
20	Miami International Airport, Miami, United States	Heathrow Airport, London, United Kingdom	369

=== London to New York ===
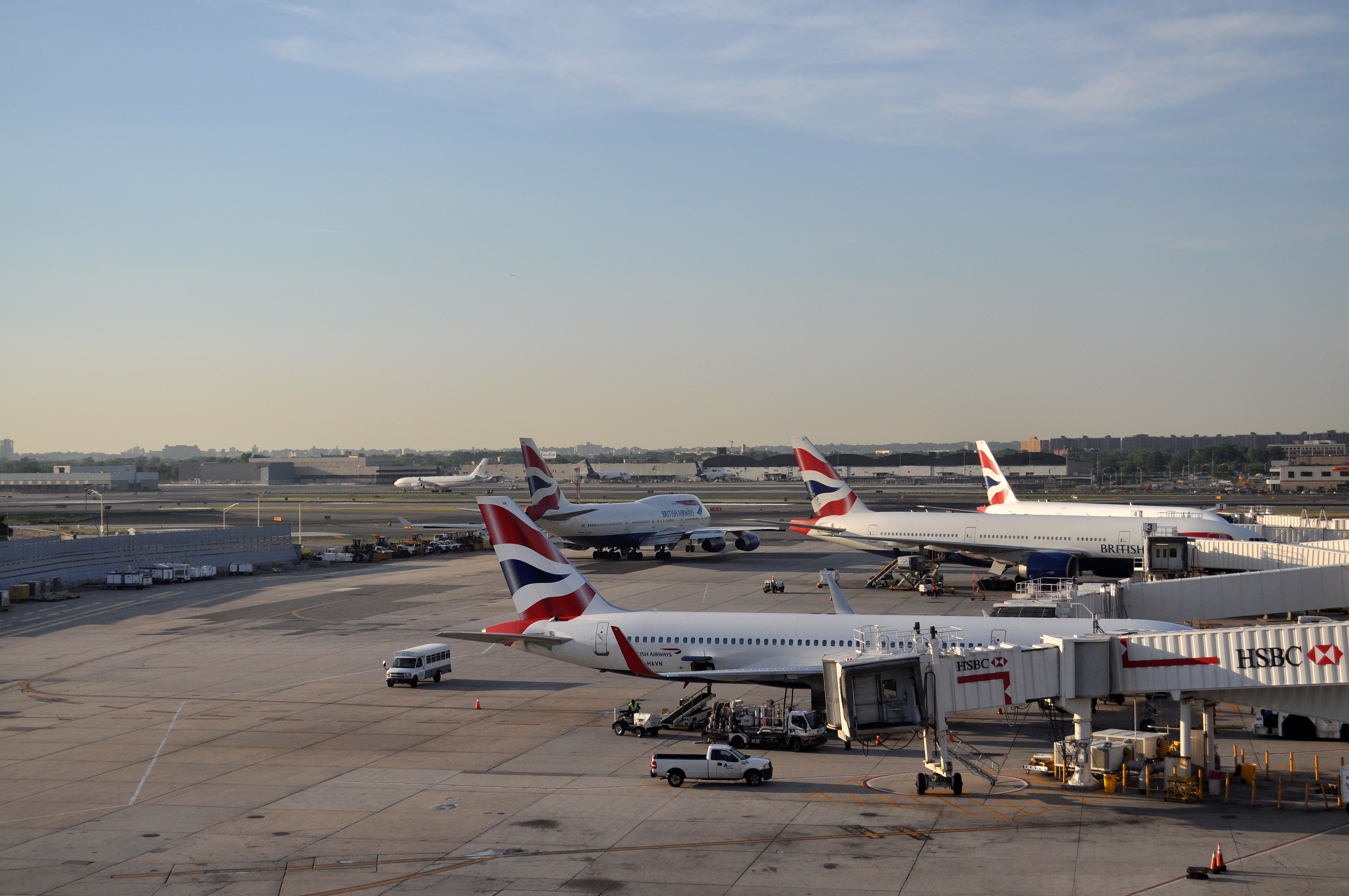
British Airways aircraft at JFK

The air route between London in the UK and New York in the USA serves around 5 million passengers per year.

These two cities are connected by a heavily utilised 2,999-nautical-mile (3,451 mi; 5,554 km) air route which has been historically important to transatlantic aviation and is today served by several major airlines (British Airways, Virgin Atlantic, American Airlines, Delta Air Lines and JetBlue Airways; United Airlines flies out of the nearby airport of Newark, 9 miles [14 km] away from downtown Manhattan). The airports of Heathrow and JFK are the main international airports for the London metropolitan area and New York metropolitan area respectively, the world's two most important global cities. The route sustains the highest number of passenger seat kilometers per annum of any route globally (10.92 billion ASK's were scheduled in 2015). In 2018 British Airways achieved a revenue of $1.16 billion on this route alone, making their operation the highest value airline route globally.

Prior to the aircraft's retirement British Airways operated a double daily supersonic Concorde service on the route which covered the 2,999 nmi (3,451 mi; 5,554 km) distance in a scheduled time of 3 hours 15 minutes westbound and just under 3 hours eastbound.

==== Passenger statistics ====
Below is a table of passenger numbers flying between Heathrow and JFK by year as published by the UK Civil Aviation Authority.

Passenger Statistics Between JFK and LHR
Year	Total Passengers	Annual Change	Passenger Kilometers (Billions)
2024	3,238,557	▲5.4%	
2023	3,073,200	▲29.5%	
2022	2,373,529	▲285.6%	
2021	615,543 (Affected by COVID-19)	▼6.6%	
2020	659,182 (Affected by COVID-19)	▼79.4%	
2019	3,192,195	▲5.2%	17,730
2018	3,034,155	▲3.0%	16.852
2017	2,945,744	▲0.4%	16.361
2016	2,934,554	▼3.8%	16.299
2015	3,050,499	▲2.6%	16.942
2014	2,972,729	▼1.4%	16.511
2013	3,015,218	▲6.2%	16.747
2012	2,839,007	▲6.0%	15.768
2011	2,678,991	▲6.4%	14.879
2010	2,517,896	▲1.6%	13.984
2009	2,478,722	▼11.6%	13.767
2008	2,802,870	▼1.3%	15.567
2007	2,839,221	▲3.2%	15.769
2006	2,751,835	-	15.284

==== Records ====
The fastest crewed flight on this route is 1 hour 54 minutes and 56.4 seconds, achieved by an eastbound SR-71 Blackbird on 1 September 1974. The flight departed from Beale Air Force Base, California and landed at Farnborough International Airshow, crossing virtual radar gates over New York and London to spare them from sonic booms. The flight required three aerial refuels with KC-135Q Stratotankers after takeoff, over South Carolina, and south of Greenland.

The fastest time for an airliner on the route is 2 hours 52 minutes and 59 seconds, this was achieved on an eastbound JFK-LHR Concorde service on 7 February 1996.

The current fastest subsonic passenger service on the route was achieved by British Airways on 9 February 2020 with a time of 4 hours 56 minutes. The Boeing 747-400 (registration: G-CIVP) operating flight BA112 departed JFK at 18:47 Eastern Standard time (23:47 UTC on 8 February) on 8 February and landed at Heathrow at 04:43 GMT/UTC on 9 February. The maximum recorded groundspeed was 825 mph (717 kn; 1,328 km/h), aided by a 200 mph (170 kn; 320 km/h) tailwind.

== Notable transatlantic flights and attempts ==
=== 1910s ===
Airship America (unsuccessful)
In October 1910, American journalist Walter Wellman, who had in 1909 attempted to reach the North Pole by balloon, set out for Europe from Atlantic City in the dirigible America. A storm off Cape Cod sent him off course, and then engine failure forced him to ditch halfway between New York and Bermuda. Wellman, his crew of five – and the balloon's cat – were rescued by a passing British ship, RMS Trent. The distance covered, about 1,000 statute miles (1,600 km), was at the time a record for a dirigible.

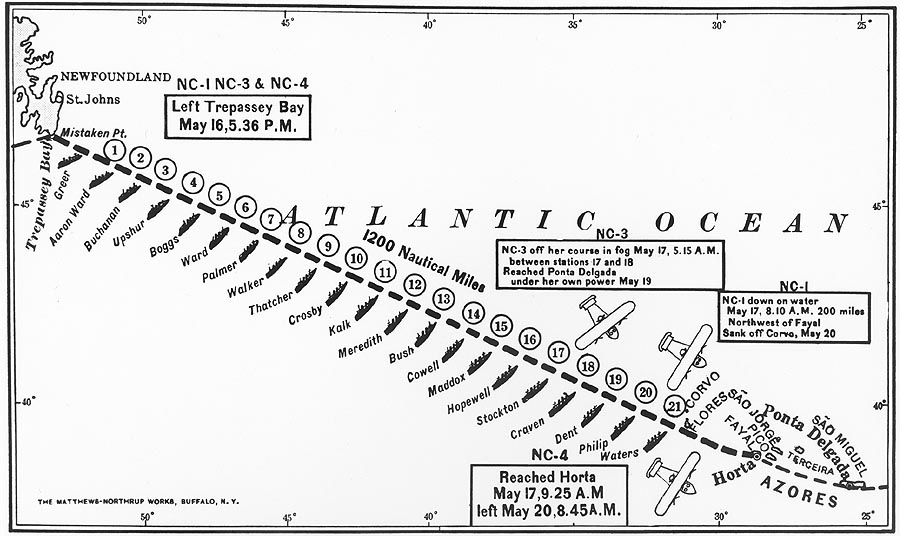
US Navy warships "strung out like a string of pearls" along the Navy Curtiss NC-4's flightpath (3rd leg)

First transatlantic flight
On 8–31 May 1919, the U.S. Navy Curtiss NC-4 flying boat under the command of Albert Read, flew 4,526 statute miles (7,284 km) from Rockaway, New York, to Plymouth (England), via among other stops Trepassey (Newfoundland), Horta and Ponta Delgada (both Azores) and Lisbon (Portugal) in 53 h 58 min, spread over 23 days. The crossing from Newfoundland to the European mainland took 10 days 22 hours, with the total time in flight of 26 h 46 min. The longest non-stop leg of the journey, from Trepassey, Newfoundland, to Horta in the Azores, was 1,200 statute miles (1,900 km) and lasted 15 h 18 min.

Sopwith Atlantic (unsuccessful)
On 18 May 1919, the Australian Harry Hawker, together with navigator Kenneth Mackenzie Grieve, made the first attempt at a non-stop flight across the Atlantic Ocean. They set off from Mount Pearl, Newfoundland, in the Sopwith Atlantic biplane. After fourteen and a half hours of flight the engine overheated and they were forced to divert towards the shipping lanes. They were found a passing freighter, the Danish Mary, established contact and crash-landed ahead of her. Mary's radio was out of order, so it was not until six days later when the boat reached Scotland that word was received that they were safe. The wheels from the undercarriage, jettisoned soon after takeoff, were later recovered by local fishermen and are now in the Newfoundland Museum in St. John's.

First non-stop transatlantic flight
On 14–15 June 1919, Capt. John Alcock and Lieut. Arthur Whitten Brown of the United Kingdom in Vickers Vimy bomber, between islands, 1,960 nautical miles (3,630 km), from St. John's, Newfoundland, to Clifden, Ireland, in 16h 12m.

First east-to-west transatlantic flight
On 2 July 1919, Major George Herbert Scott of the Royal Air Force with his crew and passengers flies from RAF East Fortune, Scotland to Mineola, New York (on Long Island) in airship R34, covering a distance of about 3,000 statute miles (4,800 km) in about four and a half days. R34 then made the return trip to England arriving at RNAS Pulham in 75 hours, completing the first double crossing of the Atlantic (east-west-east).

=== 1920s ===
First flight across the South Atlantic
On 30 March–17 June 1922, Lieutenant Commander Sacadura Cabral and Commander Gago Coutinho of Portugal, using three Fairey IIID floatplanes (Lusitania, Portugal, and Santa Cruz), after two ditchings, with only internal means of navigation (the Coutinho-invented sextant with artificial horizon) from Lisbon, Portugal, to Rio de Janeiro, Brazil.

First non-stop aircraft flight between European and American mainlands
On 12 October 1924, the Zeppelin LZ-126 (later known as ZR-3 USS Los Angeles), began an 81-hour flight from Germany to New Jersey with a crew commanded by Hugo Eckener, covering a distance of 4,867 statute miles (7,833 km).

First night-time flight across the Atlantic
On the night of 16–17 April 1927, the Portuguese aviators Sarmento de Beires, Jorge de Castilho and Manuel Gouveia, flew from the Bijagós islands, Portuguese Guinea to Fernando de Noronha island, Brazil in the Dornier Wal flying boat Argos.

First flight across the South Atlantic made by a non-European crew
On 28 April 1927, Brazilian João Ribeiro de Barros, with the assistance of João Negrão (co-pilot), Newton Braga (navigator), and Vasco Cinquini (mechanic), crossed the Atlantic in the hydroplane Jahú. The four aviators flew from Genoa, in Italy, to Santo Amaro (São Paulo), making stops in Spain, Gibraltar, Cape Verde and Fernando de Noronha, in the Brazilian territory.

Disappearance of L'Oiseau Blanc
On 8–9 May 1927, Charles Nungesser and François Coli attempted to cross the Atlantic from Paris to the US in a Levasseur PL-8 biplane L'Oiseau Blanc ("The White Bird"), but were lost.

First solo transatlantic flight and first non-stop fixed-wing aircraft flight between North America and mainland Europe
On 20–21 May 1927, Charles A. Lindbergh flew his Ryan monoplane (named Spirit of St. Louis), 3,600 nautical miles (6,700 km), from Roosevelt Field, New York to Paris–Le Bourget Airport, in 33½ hours.
First transatlantic air passenger
On 4–6 June 1927, the first transatlantic air passenger was Charles A. Levine. He was carried as a passenger by Clarence D. Chamberlin from Roosevelt Field, New York, to Eisleben, Germany, in a Wright-powered Bellanca.
First non-stop air crossing of the South Atlantic
On 14–15 October 1927, Dieudonne Costes and Joseph Le Brix, flying a Breguet 19, flew from Senegal to Brazil.
First non-stop fixed-wing aircraft westbound flight over the North Atlantic
On 12–13 April 1928, Ehrenfried Günther Freiherr von Hünefeld and Capt. Hermann Köhl of Germany and Comdr. James Fitzmaurice of Ireland, flew a Junkers W33 monoplane (named Bremen), 2,070 statute miles (3,330 km), from Baldonnell near Dublin, Ireland, to Labrador, in 36½ hours.

First crossing of the Atlantic by a woman
On 17–18 June 1928, Amelia Earhart was the first woman to cross the Atlantic Ocean by air with pilot Wilmer Stultz and copilot/mechanic Louis Gordon.

Notable flight (around the world)
On 1–8 August 1929, in making the circumnavigation, Hugo Eckener piloted the LZ 127 Graf Zeppelin across the Atlantic three times: from Germany 4,391 statute miles (7,067 km) east to west in four days from 1 August; return 4,391 statute miles (7,067 km) west to east in two days from 8 August; after completing the circumnavigation to Lakehurst, a final 4,391 statute miles (7,067 km) west to east landing 4 September, making three crossings in 34 days.

=== 1930s ===
First scheduled transatlantic passenger flights
From 1931 onwards, LZ 127 Graf Zeppelin operated the world's first scheduled transatlantic passenger flights, mainly between Germany and Brazil (64 such round trips overall) sometimes stopping in Spain, Miami, London, and Berlin.
First nonstop east-to-west fixed-wing aircraft flight between European mainland and North America
On 1–2 September 1930, Dieudonne Costes and Maurice Bellonte flew a Breguet 19 Super Bidon biplane (named Point d'Interrogation, Question Mark), 6,200 km from Paris to Curtiss Field, Long Island, New York City.
First non-stop flight to exceed 5,000 miles distance
On 28–30 July 1931, Russell Norton Boardman and John Louis Polando flew a Bellanca Special J-300 high-wing monoplane named the Cape Cod from New York City's Floyd Bennett Field to Istanbul’s Yeşilköy Airport –present day Atatürk Airport– in 49:20 hours in completely crossing the North Atlantic and much of the Mediterranean Sea; establishing a straight-line distance record of 5,011.8 miles (8,065.7 km).
First solo crossing of the South Atlantic
27–28 November 1931. Bert Hinkler flew from Canada to New York, then via the West Indies, Venezuela, British Guiana, Brazil and the South Atlantic to Great Britain in a de Havilland Puss Moth.
First solo crossing of the Atlantic by a woman
On 20 May 1932, Amelia Earhart set off from Harbour Grace, Newfoundland, intending to fly to Paris in her single engine Lockheed Vega 5b to emulate Charles Lindbergh's solo flight. After encountering storms and a burnt exhaust pipe, Earhart landed in a pasture at Culmore, north of Derry, Northern Ireland, ending a flight lasting 14h 56m.
First solo westbound crossing of the Atlantic
On 18–19 August 1932, Jim Mollison, flying a de Havilland Puss Moth, flew from Dublin to New Brunswick.
Lightest (empty weight) aircraft that crossed the Atlantic
On 7–8 May 1933, Stanisław Skarżyński made a solo flight across the South Atlantic, covering 3,582 kilometres (2,226 mi), in a RWD-5bis – empty weight below 450 kilograms (990 lb). If considering the total takeoff weight (as per FAI records) then there is a longer distance Atlantic crossing: the distance world record holder, Piper PA-24 Comanche in this class, 1000–1750 kg. FAI
Mass flight
Notable mass transatlantic flight: On 1–15 July 1933, Gen. Italo Balbo of Italy led 24 Savoia-Marchetti S.55X seaplanes 6,100 statute miles (9,800 km), in a flight from Orbetello, Italy, to the Century of Progress International Exposition Chicago, Illinois, in 47h 52m. The flight made six intermediate stops. Previously, Balbo had led a flight of 12 flying boats from Rome to Rio de Janeiro, Brazil, in December 1930 – January 1931, taking nearly a month.
First solo westbound crossing of the Atlantic by a woman and first person to solo westbound from England
On 4–5 September 1936, Beryl Markham, flying a Percival Vega Gull from Abingdon (then in Berkshire, now Oxfordshire), intended to fly to New York, but was forced down at Cape Breton Island, Nova Scotia, due to icing of fuel tank vents.
First transatlantic passenger service on heavier-than air aircraft
on 24 June 1939, Pan American inaugurated transatlantic passenger service between New York and Marseille, France, using Boeing 314 flying boats. On 8 July 1939, a service began between New York and Southampton as well. A single fare was US$375.00 ($8,680 in 2025 dollars). Scheduled landplane flights started in October 1945.

=== 1940s ===
First transatlantic flight of non-rigid airships
On 1 June 1944, two K class blimps from Blimp Squadron 14 of the United States Navy (USN) completed the first transatlantic crossing by non-rigid airships. On 28 May 1944, the two K-ships (K-123 and K-130) left South Weymouth, Massachusetts, and flew approximately 16 hours to Naval Station Argentia, Newfoundland. From Argentia, the blimps flew approximately 22 hours to Lajes Field on Terceira Island in the Azores. The final leg of the first transatlantic crossing was about a 20-hour flight from the Azores to Craw Field in Port Lyautey (Kenitra), French Morocco.
First jet aircraft to cross the Atlantic Ocean
On 14 July 1948, six de Havilland Vampire F3s of No. 54 Squadron RAF, commanded by Wing Commander D S Wilson-MacDonald, DSO, DFC, flew via Stornoway, Iceland, and Labrador to Montreal on the first leg of a goodwill tour of the U.S. and Canada.

=== 1950s ===
First jet aircraft to make a non-stop transatlantic flight
On 21 February 1951, an RAF English Electric Canberra B Mk 2 (serial number WD932) flown by Squadron Leader A Callard of the Aeroplane & Armament Experimental Establishment, flew from Aldergrove Northern Ireland, to Gander, Newfoundland. The flight covered almost 1,800 nautical miles (3,300 km) in 4h 37 m. The aircraft was being flown to the U.S. to act as a pattern aircraft for the Martin B-57 Canberra.
First jet aircraft transatlantic passenger service
On 4 October 1958, British Overseas Airways Corporation (BOAC) flew the first jet airliner service using the de Havilland Comet, when G-APDC initiated the first transatlantic Comet 4 service and the first scheduled transatlantic passenger jet service in history, flying from London to New York with a stopover at Gander.

=== 1970s ===
First supersonic commercial flight across the Atlantic Ocean
On 21 January 1976, the Concorde jet made its first commercial flight. Supersonic flights were available until 2003.
First transatlantic flight by balloon
The Double Eagle II, piloted by Ben Abruzzo, Maxie Anderson, and Larry Newman, became the first balloon to cross the Atlantic Ocean when it landed 17 August 1978 in Miserey near Paris, 137 hours 6 minutes after leaving Presque Isle, Maine.

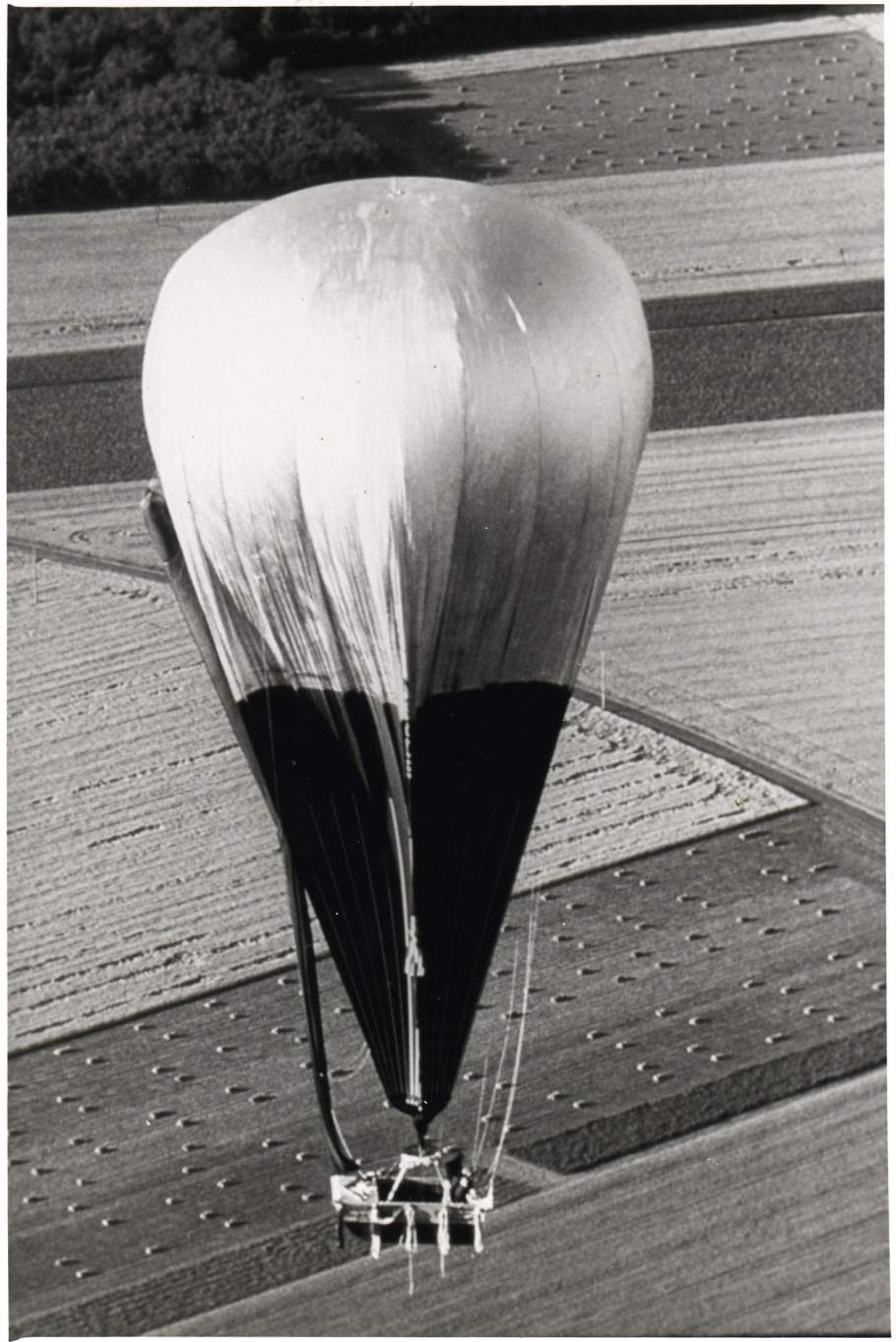
Double Eagle II

=== 1980s ===
First solo crossing by helicopter
Dick Smith, Bell Jetranger III, August 1982.

First balloon crossing by a woman
In September 1986, Evelien Brink, her husband Henk and Willem Hageman completed the first transatlantic balloon flight by a European team and first with a woman aboard. The Dutch Viking (PH-EIS) completed the journey from St. John’s, Newfoundland to Almere, Netherlands in 51 hours and 14 minutes. This bested the time set by the Double Eagle II significantly, though the Dutch Viking suffered a near-disastrous landing.

=== 2010s ===
First fully electric solar powered transatlantic flight
Solar Impulse piloted by Bertrand Piccard and André Borschberg flew from New York City to Seville landing on the 21st June 2016.

== Other early transatlantic flights ==
- 29 June – 1 July 1927: Admiral Richard Byrd with crew flew Fokker F.VIIa/3m America from New York City to France.
- 13 July 1928: Ludwik Idzikowski and Kazimierz Kubala attempt a crossing of the Atlantic westbound from Paris to the US in an Amiot 123 biplane, but crash in the Azores.
- 6–9 February 1933. Jim Mollison flew a Puss Moth from Senegal to Brazil, across South Atlantic, becoming the first person to fly solo across the North and South Atlantics.
- 15–17 July 1933: Lithuanians Steponas Darius and Stasys Girėnas were supposed to make a non-stop flight from New York City via Newfoundland to Kaunas in their aircraft named Lituanica, but crashed in the forests of Germany after 6,411 km of flying, only 650 km short of their final destination after a flying time 37 hours, 11 minutes. They carried the first transatlantic airmail consignment.
- 10 December 1936: Portuguese-American aviator Joseph Costa took off from the Elmira-Corning Regional Airport in a Lockheed Vega named "Crystal City", attempting to cross the Atlantic and land in Portugal, via Brazil. His plane crashed just before a stopover in Rio de Janeiro, on 15 January 1937.
- 5 July 1937: Captain Harold Gray of Pan Am flew from Botwood, Newfoundland to Foynes, Ireland, in a Sikorsky S-42 flying boat as part of the first transatlantic commercial passenger test flights. On 6 July 1937, Captain Arthur Wilcockson of Imperial Airways flew from Foynes to Botwood, in a Short Empire class flying boat named Caledonia.
- 21 July 1938: The Short Mercury flew from Foynes, on the west coast of Ireland, to Boucherville, Montreal, Quebec, Canada, a flight of 2,930 statute miles (4,720 km). The Short Maia, flown by Captain A.S. Wilcockson, took off carrying Mercury (piloted by Captain, later Air Vice Marshal Don Bennett). (Note: Captain Bennett was later the first commander of the RAF Pathfinder Force in World War II.)Mercury separated from the carrier aircraft to continue what was to become the first commercial non-stop east-to-west transatlantic flight by a heavier-than-air machine. This initial journey took 20 hrs 21 min at an average ground speed of 144 miles per hour (232 km/h).
- 10 August 1938: The first non-stop flight with a long-range airliner from Berlin to New York was with a Focke-Wulf Fw 200 Condor that flew Berlin-Staaken to Floyd Bennett in 24 hours, 56 minutes and did the return flight to Berlin-Tempelhof three days later in 19 hours, 47 minutes.

== Notable transatlantic flights of the 21st century ==
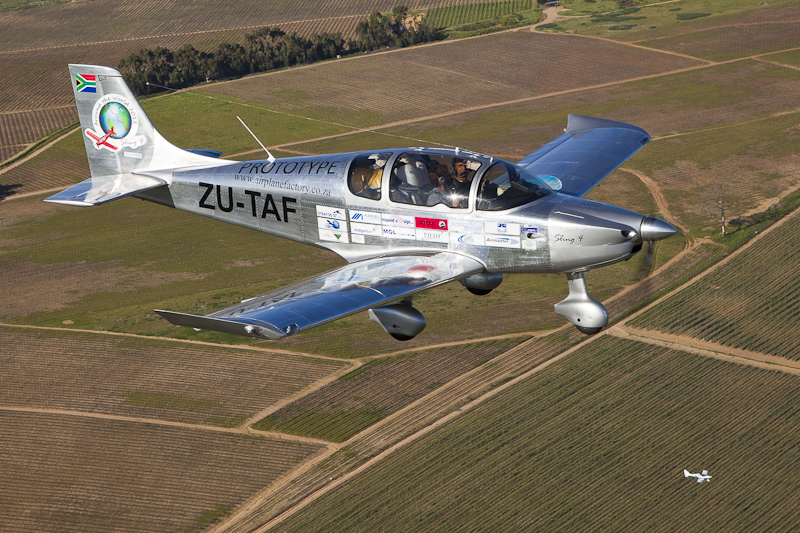
The prototype Sling 4 Light Sport Aircraft on arrival at Stellenbosch, Western Cape, South Africa

- 2 May 2002: Lindbergh's grandson, Erik Lindbergh, celebrated the 75th anniversary of the pioneering 1927 flight of the Spirit of St. Louis by duplicating the journey in a single engine, two seat Lancair Columbia 200. The younger Lindbergh's solo flight from Republic Airport on Long Island, to Le Bourget Airport in Paris was completed in 17 hours and 7 minutes, or just a little more than half the time of his grandfather's 33.5-hour original flight.
- 22–23 September 2011: Mike Blyth and Jean d'Assonville flew a Sling 4 prototype Light Sport Aircraft, registration ZU-TAF, non-stop from Cabo Frio International Airport, Brazil to Cape Town International Airport, South Africa, a distance of 6,222 km, in 27 hours. The crew set course for co-ordinates 34°S 31°W to take advantage of the westerly winds and at the turning point proceeded in an easterly direction, roughly following the 35°S parallel. This took them within 140 km north of the most remote inhabited island in the world, Tristan da Cunha. The Cabo Frio/Cape Town leg was part of an around the world flight.

== Failed transatlantic attempts of the 21st century ==
In July 2007, a former airline pilot was killed a few minutes after taking off at Basel-Mulhouse airport on a flight to commemorate Lindbergh. Being severely tail-heavy, he collided on a level flight with the roof of an apartment house in Basel. Though having a permit for overweight flights, he never carried out an overweight test flight, he failed to properly calculate mass distribution, and he also did not abort the take-off when it was still safe to do so.

In September 2013, Jonathan Trappe lifted off from Caribou, Maine, United States in an attempt to make the first crossing of the Atlantic Ocean by cluster balloon. The craft was essentially a small yellow lifeboat attached to 370 balloons filled with helium. A short time later, due to difficulty controlling the balloons, Trappe was forced to land near the town of York Harbour, Newfoundland and Labrador, Canada. Trappe had expected to arrive in Europe sometime between three and six days after liftoff. The craft ascended by the dropping of ballast, and was to drift at an altitude of up to 25,000 feet (7,600 m). It was intended to follow wind currents toward Europe, the intended destination, although unpredictable wind currents could have forced the craft to North Africa or Norway. To descend, Trappe would have popped or released some of the balloons. The last time the Atlantic was crossed by helium balloon was in 1984 by Colonel Joe Kittinger.

On 25 July 2015, Russian pilot Sergey Ananov attempted the most challenging segment (transatlantic) of his solo around-the-world helicopter flight in a Robinson R22, an aircraft weighing less than 1,000 kg. He took off from Iqaluit, Canada, en route to Nuuk, Greenland. Approximately halfway through the flight, the helicopter’s engine drive belt snapped, causing immediate engine failure. Ananov attempted an emergency landing on sea ice, but the helicopter broke through and sank within seconds, taking most of his supplies. Ananov survived for over 30 hours on a drifting ice floe, exposed to freezing temperatures and without food or water. He lost his life raft early on due to strong winds. At one point, he had to remain motionless to avoid drawing the attention of a nearby polar bear. On 27 July, the crew of the Canadian Coast Guard ship Pierre Radisson spotted his last distress flare and rescued him. First successful solo transatlantic flight in a helicopter weighing less than 1,000 kg (Robinson R44 Cadet – MTOW 998 kg) was performed by Polish pilot Piotr Wilk in 2021.

== Records ==
The fastest transatlantic flight was done by a Lockheed SR-71 Blackbird from New York to London in 1 hour 55 minutes in 1974. The fastest time for an airliner is 2 hours 53 minutes for JFK–London Heathrow by Concorde in 1996.

With the demise of the SR-71 and the supersonic airliners, and supercruise-capable fighter jets not having the necessary range, new transatlantic speed records are achieved with favorable tailwinds, thus giving a "supersonic" ground speed. Though some earlier airliners like the Boeing 747 were capable of cruise flight at speeds as high as Mach 0.92 (1 being the speed of sound at the relevant air density), newer models like the Boeing 787 and the Airbus 350 can reach 0.89, but will usually cruise at 0.82 to 0.85 for fuel economy reasons. The fastest civilian jet as of 2025, the Bombardier Global 8000, can cruise at Mach 0.92.

The fastest JFK-LHR time for a subsonic airliner is 4 hours 56 minutes by a British Airways Boeing 747-400 in February 2020. The distance JFK-LHR is 5,540 kilometres (3,440 mi).

== See also ==
- Transatlantic crossing
- Transatlantic communications cable
- Transatlantic relations
- Transatlantic tunnel
- Transpacific crossing
- Transpacific flight
