= List of commercial transatlantic flights =

The following is a list of transatlantic flights classified by airline. Some flights may be transatlantic while not being classed as such; for instance SQ21&22 (alongside 23&24) may fly over the Atlantic if wind conditions are preferable, but may fly over Asia or the Arctic Ocean instead.

| Airlines | Airline's Hubs | Destinations |
|---|---|---|
| (Republic of Ireland) Aer Lingus | (Republic of Ireland) Ireland; Dublin; Shannon | (Canada) Canada; Toronto-Pearson United States of America; Boston (Logan); Chicago-O'Hare; Cleveland; Hartford; Los Angeles; New York-JFK; Newark; Orlando; Philadelphia Raleigh; San Francisco; Seattle-Tacoma; Washington Dulles Seasonal: United States of America; Miami |
| (Argentina) Aerolíneas Argentinas | Argentina Buenos Aires-Ezeiza | Italy Rome-Fiumicino (Spain) Spain; Madrid-Barajas |
| (Mexico) Aeroméxico | Mexico Mexico City | France; Paris-Charles de Gaulle; Italy; Rome-Fiumicino (Netherlands) The Netherlands; Amsterdam-Schiphol (Spain) Spain; Barcelona; Madrid-Barajas (United Kingdom) United Kingdom; London-Heathrow |
| (Algeria) Air Algérie | Algeria Algiers-Houari Boumediene | Canada Montréal-Pierre Elliott Trudeau |
| Air Canada | Canada; Calgary; Halifax-Stanfield; Montreal-Pierre Elliott Trudeau; Toronto-Pearson; Vancouver | Austria; Vienna; Belgium; Brussels; France; Lyon; Paris-Charles de Gaulle; Germany; Frankfurt; Munich (India) India; New Delhi; Mumbai(Fifth Freedom) (Republic of Ireland) Ireland; Dublin (Israel) Israel; Tel Aviv-Ben Gurion; Italy; Rome-Fiumicino; Milan-Malpensa (Morocco) Morocco; Casablanca; Netherlands; Amsterdam-Schiphol; Portugal; Lisbon; Switzerland; Geneva; Zurich; United Arab Emirates; Dubai; United Kingdom; London-Heathrow Seasonal: Denmark; Copenhagen; Spain; Madrid-Barajas; United Kingdom; Edinburgh; Manchester |
| (France) Air Caraïbes | (France) France; Paris-Orly Airport (Guadeloupe) Guadeloupe; Pointe-à-Pitre | (Cuba) Cuba; Havana; Santiago (Dominican Republic) Dominican Republic; Punta Cana (French Guiana) French Guiana; Cayenne (Haiti) Haiti; Port-au-Prince (Martinique) Martinique; Aimé Césaire; Mexico; Cancún Seasonal: (The Bahamas) The Bahamas; San Salvador |
| (Spain) Air Europa | Spain Madrid-Barajas Airport | Argentina Buenos Aires-Ezeiza International Airport Córdoba Ingeniero Aeronáutico Ambrosio L.V. Taravella International Airport Bolivia Santa Cruz de la Sierra-Viru Viru International Airport Brazil Fortaleza Airport Deputado Luís Eduardo Magalhães International Airport Recife/Guararapes–Gilberto Freyre International Airport São Paulo–Guarulhos International Airport Colombia Bogotá El Dorado International Airport Medellín Airport Cuba Havana José Martí International Airport Dominican Republic Punta Cana International Airport Santo Domingo-Las Americás International Airport Ecuador Guayaquil José Joaquín de Olmedo International Airport Mariscal Sucre International Airport Honduras San Pedro Sula Ramón Villeda Morales International Airport Mexico Cancún International Airport Panama Tocumen International Airport Paraguay Asunción Silvio Pettirossi International Airport Peru Lima Jorge Chávez International Airport Puerto Rico San Juan Luis Muñoz Marín International Airport United States of America Miami International Airport; John F. Kennedy International Airport Uruguay Montevideo-Carrasco International Airport Venezuela Caracas Simón Bolívar International Airport |
| Air France | France; Paris-Charles de Gaulle Airport; Paris-Orly Airport | Argentina Buenos Aires-Ezeiza International Airport Brazil Fortaleza Airport Rio de Janeiro–Galeão International Airport São Paulo–Guarulhos International Airport Canada; Montréal–Pierre Elliott Trudeau International Airport Toronto Pearson International Airport; Vancouver International Airport Seasonal: Québec City Jean Lesage International Airport Chile Santiago International Airport Colombia Bogotá El Dorado International Airport Costa Rica San José Juan Santamaría International Airport Cuba Havana José Martí International Airport Dominican Republic Punta Cana International Airport Santo Domingo-Las Americás International Airport France Cayenne – Félix Eboué Airport Martinique Aimé Césaire International Airport Pointe-à-Pitre International Airport Papeete Fa'a'ā International Airport Mexico Cancún International Airport Mexico City International Airport Panama Panama City-Tocumen International Airport Peru Lima Jorge Chávez International Airport Sint Maarten Princess Juliana International Airport; United States of America; Hartsfield–Jackson Atlanta International Airport; Boston-Logan International Airport Chicago-O'Hare International Airport; Detroit Metropolitan Wayne County Airport; Houston-George Bush Intercontinental Airport; Los Angeles International Airport Miami International Airport; John F. Kennedy International Airport; San Francisco International Airport Seattle–Tacoma International Airport; Washington Dulles International Airport; Seasonal: Dallas Fort Worth International Airport Denver International Airport; Minneapolis–Saint Paul International Airport Venezuela Caracas Simón Bolívar International Airport |
| Air Greenland | Greenland Kangerlussuaq Airport Seasonal: Narsarsuaq Airport | Denmark Copenhagen Airport |
| Air India | India Indira Gandhi International Airport Mumbai Chhatrapati Shivaji International Airport United Kingdom London-Heathrow | Canada Toronto Pearson International Airport United States of America Chicago-O'Hare International Airport John F. Kennedy International Airport Newark Liberty International Airport San Francisco International Airport Dulles International Airport |
| Air New Zealand | New Zealand Auckland Airport United States of America Los Angeles International Airport Stopover | United Kingdom London-Heathrow |
| Air Serbia | Serbia; Belgrade Nikola Tesla Airport | United States of America; John F. Kennedy International Airport Chicago-O'Hare International Airport |
| Air Tahiti Nui | French Polynesia Papeete Fa'a'ā International Airport United States of America Los Angeles International Airport Stopover | France Paris-Charles de Gaulle Airport |
| Air Transat | Canada Montréal–Pierre Elliott Trudeau International Airport Toronto Pearson International Airport Vancouver International Airport Seasonal: Calgary International Airport Québec City Jean Lesage International Airport | Belgium Seasonal: Brussels International Airport Croatia Seasonal: Zagreb Airport Czech Republic; Seasonal: Prague Airport France; Paris-Charles de Gaulle Airport Seasonal: Bordeaux–Mérignac Airport Lyon–Saint-Exupéry Airport Marseille Provence Airport Nantes Atlantique Airport Nice Côte d'Azur Airport Toulouse–Blagnac Airport France Switzerland Seasonal: EuroAirport Basel Mulhouse Freiburg Greece; Seasonal: Athens International Airport Ireland Seasonal: Dublin Airport Israel Seasonal: Tel Aviv Ben Gurion International Airport Italy Seasonal: Lamezia Terme International Airport Rome-Fiumicino International Airport Venice Marco Polo Airport Netherlands Seasonal: Amsterdam Airport Schiphol Portugal; Lisbon Portela Airport Porto Airport Seasonal: Faro Airport Spain Málaga Airport Seasonal: Barcelona–El Prat Airport Madrid–Barajas Airport United Kingdom Glasgow Airport; London-Gatwick Manchester Airport Seasonal: Birmingham Airport |
| American Airlines | United States of America; Charlotte Douglas International Airport; Chicago-O'Hare International Airport; Dallas/Fort Worth International Airport; Los Angeles International Airport; Miami International Airport; John F. Kennedy International Airport; Philadelphia International Airport; Phoenix Sky Harbor International Airport | Czech Republic; Seasonal: Prague Airport France; Paris-Charles de Gaulle Airport; Germany; Frankfurt Airport Seasonal: Munich International Airport; Greece; Seasonal: Athens International Airport Hungary Seasonal: Budapest Ferenc Liszt International Airport Iceland; Seasonal: Reykjavík-Keflavik Airport Ireland; Dublin Airport; Seasonal: Shannon Airport; Italy; Milan-Malpensa Airport; Rome-Fiumicino International Airport; Seasonal: Venice Marco Polo Airport; Netherlands; Amsterdam Airport Schiphol; Portugal; Seasonal: Lisbon Portela Airport; Spain; Barcelona El-Prat Airport; Madrid-Barajas Airport; Switzerland; Zurich Airport; United Kingdom; London-Heathrow; Manchester Airport; Seasonal: Edinburgh Airport; Glasgow Airport |
| Austrian Airlines | Austria; Vienna International Airport | Canada; Montréal–Pierre Elliott Trudeau International Airport Toronto Pearson International Airport; United States of America; Chicago-O'Hare International Airport; Newark Liberty International Airport John F. Kennedy International Airport; Washington Dulles International Airport; Seasonal: Los Angeles International Airport; Miami International Airport |
| Avianca | Colombia Bogotá El Dorado International Airport; Cali Alfonso Bonilla Aragón International Airport; Medellín José María Córdova International Airport | Germany; Munich Airport Spain; Barcelona–El Prat Airport; Madrid Barajas Airport; United Kingdom; London-Heathrow |
| Azerbaijan Airlines | Azerbaijan Heydar Aliyev International Airport | United States of America; John F. Kennedy International Airport |
| Azores Airlines | Portugal; João Paulo II Airport | Canada; Toronto Pearson International Airport Seasonal: Montréal–Pierre Elliott Trudeau International Airport United States of America Logan International Airport Seasonal: Oakland International Airport T. F. Green Airport |
| Azul Brazilian Airlines | Brazil Viracopos International Airport | France Seasonal: Paris-Orly Portugal; Lisbon Portela Airport |
| British Airways | United Kingdom London-Gatwick; London-Heathrow | Antigua and Barbuda V. C. Bird International Airport Argentina; Buenos Aires-Ezeiza; Bahamas; Lynden Pindling International Airport Barbados Grantley Adams International Airport Bermuda L.F. Wade International Airport; Brazil; Rio de Janeiro-Galeão International Airport; São Paulo-Guarulhos International Airport; Canada; Montréal–Pierre Elliott Trudeau International Airport; Toronto Pearson International Airport; Vancouver International Airport Seasonal: Calgary International Airport; Cayman Islands; Owen Roberts International Airport Chile Santiago International Airport Costa Rica San José Juan Santamaría International Airport Dominican Republic Punta Cana International Airport Grenada Maurice Bishop International Airport Jamaica Norman Manley International Airport Mexico; Cancún International Airport Mexico City International Airport Peru Seasonal: Lima Jorge Chávez International Airport Saint Kitts and Nevis Robert L. Bradshaw International Airport Saint Lucia Hewanorra International Airport Trinidad and Tobago Piarco International Airport Arthur Napoleon Raymond Robinson International Airport Turks & Caicos Providenciales International Airport United States of America; Hartsfield–Jackson Atlanta International Airport; Austin-Bergstrom International Airport; Baltimore/Washington International Thurgood Marshall Airport; Boston-Logan International Airport; Chicago-O'Hare International Airport; Dallas/Fort Worth International Airport; Denver International Airport; Houston-George Bush Intercontinental Airport; Las Vegas McCarran International Airport; Los Angeles International Airport; Miami International Airport; Nashville International Airport; Louis Armstrong New Orleans International Airport; John F. Kennedy International Airport; Newark Liberty International Airport; Oakland International Airport; Orlando International Airport; Philadelphia International Airport; Phoenix Sky Harbor International Airport; San Diego International Airport; San Francisco International Airport; San Jose International Airport; Seattle-Tacoma International Airport; Tampa International Airport; Washington Dulles International Airport |
| Boliviana de Aviación | Bolivia Viru Viru International Airport | Spain Adolfo Suárez Madrid–Barajas Airport |
| Brussels Airlines | Belgium; Brussels International Airport | Canada; Toronto Pearson International Airport; United States of America; John F. Kennedy International Airport; Seasonal: Washington Dulles International Airport |
| Condor | Germany Frankfurt Airport Munich Airport Düsseldorf Airport | Antigua and Barbuda Seasonal: V. C. Bird International Airport Barbados Grantley Adams International Airport Brazil Pinto Martins – Fortaleza International Airport Recife/Guararapes–Gilberto Freyre International Airport Canada Seasonal: Calgary International Airport Halifax Stanfield International Airport Toronto Pearson International Airport Vancouver International Airport Erik Nielsen Whitehorse International Airport Costa Rica Juan Santamaría International Airport Cuba José Martí International Airport Frank País Airport Juan Gualberto Gómez Airport Seasonal: Abel Santamaría Airport Curaçao Curaçao International Airport Dominican Republic Gregorio Luperón International Airport Punta Cana International Airport Las Américas International Airport Guadeloupe Seasonal: Pointe-à-Pitre International Airport Jamaica Sangster International Airport Martinique Martinique Aimé Césaire International Airport Mexico Cancún International Airport Puerto Rico Luis Muñoz Marín International Airport Saint Lucia Seasonal: Hewanorra International Airport Trinidad and Tobago Arthur Napoleon Raymond Robinson International Airport United States McCarran International Airport Seattle–Tacoma International Airport Seasonal: Ted Stevens Anchorage International Airport Baltimore–Washington International Airport Fairbanks International Airport Los Angeles International Airport Minneapolis–Saint Paul International Airport Louis Armstrong New Orleans International Airport Sky Harbor International Airport Pittsburgh International Airport Portland International Airport |
| Delta Air Lines | United States of America Hartsfield–Jackson Atlanta International Airport Boston Logan International Airport Detroit Metropolitan Wayne County Airport John F. Kennedy International Airport Los Angeles International Airport Minneapolis–Saint Paul International Airport Salt Lake City International Airport Seattle–Tacoma International Airport | Belgium Brussels Airport Czech Republic; Seasonal: Prague Airport Denmark Seasonal: Copenhagen Airport France; Paris-Charles de Gaulle Airport Seasonal: Nice Côte d'Azur Airport Germany Düsseldorf Airport Frankfurt Airport Munich Airport Stuttgart Airport Seasonal: Berlin Tegel Airport Ghana Accra International Airport Greece; Seasonal: Athens International Airport Iceland Keflavík International Airport Ireland; Dublin Airport; Seasonal: Shannon Airport Israel Tel Aviv Ben Gurion International Airport Italy; Milan-Malpensa Airport; Rome-Fiumicino International Airport; Seasonal: Venice Marco Polo Airport Netherlands; Amsterdam Airport Schiphol Nigeria Murtala Muhammed International Airport Portugal; Lisbon Portela Airport João Paulo II Airport Senegal Blaise Diagne International Airport South Africa O. R. Tambo International Airport Spain Barcelona–El Prat Airport Madrid–Barajas Airport Seasonal: Málaga Airport Switzerland Zurich Airport United Kingdom London-Heathrow Seasonal: Edinburgh Airport Glasgow Airport |
| (Switzerland) Edelweiss Air | Switzerland Zurich Airport | Argentina; Buenos Aires-Ezeiza Brazil Rio de Janeiro–Galeão International Airport Canada Seasonal: Calgary International Airport; Vancouver International Airport Costa Rica San José Juan Santamaría International Airport Cuba Havana José Martí International Airport Seasonal: Juan Gualberto Gómez Airport Dominican Republic Punta Cana International Airport Mexico; Cancún International Airport United States of America Orlando International Airport Tampa International Airport Seasonal: Denver International Airport McCarran International Airport San Diego International Airport |
| EgyptAir | Egypt Cairo International Airport | Canada Seasonal: Toronto Pearson International Airport United States of America John F. Kennedy International Airport |
| El Al | Israel Tel Aviv Ben Gurion International Airport | United States of America Boston Logan International Airport Fort Lauderdale-Hollywood International Airport John F. Kennedy International Airport Los Angeles International Airport Newark Liberty International Airport Miami International Airport San Francisco International Airport |
| Emirates | United Arab Emirates Dubai International Airport | Brazil Rio de Janeiro–Galeão International Airport São Paulo–Guarulhos International Airport Canada; Toronto Pearson International Airport Chile Santiago International Airport United States of America; Logan International Airport; Chicago-O'Hare International Airport; Dallas/Fort Worth International Airport; Houston-George Bush Intercontinental Airport; Los Angeles International Airport; Miami International Airport; Newark Liberty International Airport; John F. Kennedy International Airport; Orlando International Airport; San Francisco International Airport; Seattle–Tacoma International Airport; Washington Dulles International Airport |
| Ethiopian Airlines | Ethiopia Addis Ababa Bole International Airport Ireland Dublin Airport | Argentina; Buenos Aires-Ezeiza Brazil São Paulo–Guarulhos International Airport Canada; Toronto Pearson International Airport United States of America; Chicago-O'Hare International Airport Los Angeles International Airport; Newark Liberty International Airport; Washington Dulles International Airport |
| Etihad Airways | United Arab Emirates Abu Dhabi International Airport | Canada; Toronto Pearson International Airport United States of America; Chicago-O'Hare International Airport Los Angeles International Airport; John F. Kennedy International Airport; Washington Dulles International Airport |
| Finnair | Finland Helsinki Airport | Cuba; Seasonal: Havana–José Martí International Airport Dominican Republic; Seasonal: Puerto Plata Gregorio Luperón International Airport Mexico; Seasonal: Puerto Vallarta–Licenciado Gustavo Díaz Ordaz International Airport United States of America; New York–JFK Seasonal: Chicago–O'Hare International Airport; Los Angeles International Airport; Miami International Airport; San Francisco International Airport |
| French Bee | France; Paris-Orly Airport | Canada Montréal–Trudeau International Airport United States of America; Miami International Airport; Newark Liberty International Airport; San Francisco International Airport Seasonal: Los Angeles International Airport |
| Iberia | Spain Madrid–Barajas Airport | Argentina Buenos Aires-Ezeiza International Airport Brazil Rio de Janeiro–Galeão International Airport São Paulo–Guarulhos International Airport Chile Santiago International Airport Colombia Bogotá El Dorado International Airport Medellín José María Córdova International Airport Costa Rica San José Juan Santamaría International Airport Cuba Havana José Martí International Airport Dominican Republic Santo Domingo-Las Americás International Airport Ecuador Quito Mariscal Sucre International Airport El Salvador El Salvador International Airport Guatemala Guatemala City La Aurora International Airport Mexico Mexico City International Airport Panama Panama City-Tocumen International Airport Peru Lima Jorge Chávez International Airport Puerto Rico Seasonal: San Juan Luis Muñoz Marín International Airport United States of America Chicago-O'Hare International Airport Miami International Airport John F. Kennedy International Airport Seasonal: Boston-Logan International Airport Los Angeles International Airport Uruguay Montevideo-Carrasco International Airport Venezuela Caracas Simón Bolívar International Airport |
| JetBlue Airways | United States of America John F. Kennedy International Airport; Boston Logan International Airport | France; Paris Charles de Gaulle Airport Ireland; Seasonal: Dublin Airport Spain; Seasonal: Madrid–Barajas Airport The Netherlands; Amsterdam Airport Schiphol United Kingdom; London Heathrow Airport; Seasonal: Edinburgh Airport; London Gatwick Airport |
| Kenya Airways | Kenya; Jomo Kenyatta International Airport | United States of America; John F. Kennedy International Airport |
| KLM | The Netherlands; Amsterdam Airport Schiphol | Argentina; Buenos Aires-Ezeiza International Airport; Aruba; Queen Beatrix International Airport; Bonaire; Flamingo International Airport; Brazil; Pinto Martins - Fortaleza International Airport; Rio de Janeiro-Galeão International Airport; São Paulo-Guarulhos International Airport; Canada; Calgary International Airport; Edmonton International Airport; Montréal–Pierre Elliott Trudeau International Airport; Toronto Pearson International Airport; Vancouver International Airport; Chile; Santiago International Airport; Colombia; El Dorado International Airport; Cartagena Rafael Núñez International Airport; Costa Rica; Juan Santamaría International Airport; Cuba; José Martí International Airport; Curaçao; Hato International Airport; Ecuador; José Joaquín de Olmedo International Airport; Mariscal Sucre International Airport; Mexico; Mexico City International Airport; Panama; Tocumen International Airport; Peru; Jorge Chávez International Airport; Sint Maarten; Princess Juliana International Airport; Suriname; Johan Adolf Pengel International Airport; United States of America; Hartsfield–Jackson Atlanta International Airport; Logan International Airport; Chicago-O'Hare International Airport; Houston-George Bush Intercontinental Airport; McCarran International Airport; Los Angeles International Airport; Miami International Airport; Minneapolis–Saint Paul International Airport; John F. Kennedy International Airport; San Francisco International Airport; Salt Lake City International Airport; Washington Dulles International Airport |
| La Compagnie | France Paris-Charles de Gaulle Airport | United States of America Newark Liberty International Airport |
| Level | Spain Barcelona El-Prat Airport | Argentina Buenos Aires Ministro Pistarini International Airport Chile; Santiago Arturo Merino Benítez International Airport United States of America Boston-Logan International Airport Los Angeles International Airport Miami International Airport New York John F. Kennedy International Airport San Francisco International Airport |
| LOT Polish Airlines | Hungary; Budapest Ferenc Liszt International Airport; Poland; Katowice International Airport; John Paul II International Airport Kraków-Balice; Warsaw Chopin Airport | Brazil; Rio de Janeiro-Galeão International Airport; Canada; Toronto Pearson International Airport; Cuba; Juan Gualberto Gómez Airport; Dominican Republic; Puerto Plata Gregorio Luperón International Airport; Punta Cana International Airport; Mexico; Cancún International Airport; Panama; Tocumen International Airport; United States of America; Chicago-O'Hare International Airport; Los Angeles International Airport; Miami International Airport; Newark Liberty International Airport; John F. Kennedy International Airport |
| Lufthansa | Germany Düsseldorf Airport Frankfurt Airport Munich Airport | Argentina; Buenos Aires-Ezeiza International Airport; Brazil; Rio de Janeiro-Galeão International Airport; São Paulo-Guarulhos International Airport Canada; Montréal–Pierre Elliott Trudeau International Airport; Toronto Pearson International Airport; Vancouver International Airport Colombia; El Dorado International Airport; Costa Rica; Juan Santamaría International Airport; Mexico; Mexico City International Airport; Panama; Tocumen International Airport United States of America; Hartsfield–Jackson Atlanta International Airport Boston-Logan International Airport Charlotte Douglas International Airport; Chicago-O'Hare International Airport Dallas/Fort Worth International Airport Denver International Airport Detroit Metropolitan Wayne County Airport; Houston-George Bush Intercontinental Airport; Los Angeles International Airport; Miami International Airport Newark Liberty International Airport; John F. Kennedy International Airport Orlando International Airport Philadelphia International Airport San Francisco International Airport San Diego International Airport Seattle–Tacoma International Airport Tampa International Airport; Washington Dulles International Airport |
| Royal Air Maroc | Morocco Mohammed V International Airport | Brazil; Rio de Janeiro-Galeão International Airport; São Paulo-Guarulhos International Airport Canada Montréal–Pierre Elliott Trudeau International Airport United States of America John F. Kennedy International Airport Washington Dulles International Airport |
| Surinam Airways | Suriname; Johan Adolf Pengel International Airport | Netherlands; Amsterdam Airport Schiphol |
| (Switzerland) Swiss International Air Lines | Switzerland Geneva Airport Zurich Airport | Canada Montréal–Pierre Elliott Trudeau International Airport United States of America Boston-Logan International Airport; Chicago-O'Hare International Airport; Los Angeles International Airport; Miami International Airport Newark Liberty International Airport; John F. Kennedy International Airport San Francisco International Airport |
| TAP Portugal | Portugal; Lisbon Portela Airport; Porto Airport | Brazil; Belém/Val de Cans-Júlio Cezar Ribeiro International Airport; Belo Horizonte-Tancredo Neves; Brasília International Airport; Pinto Martins - Fortaleza International Airport; Greater Natal International Airport; Salgado Filho International Airport; Recife International Airport; Rio de Janeiro-Galeão International Airport; Salvador-Deputado Luís Eduardo Magalhães International Airport; São Paulo-Guarulhos International Airport; Canada; Toronto Pearson International Airport; United States of America; Boston-Logan International Airport; Miami International Airport; Newark Liberty International Airport; John F. Kennedy International Airport; Venezuela; Simón Bolívar International Airport |
| TUI fly Netherlands | Netherlands; Amsterdam Airport Schiphol | Aruba; Queen Beatrix International Airport; Bonaire; Flamingo International Airport; Cuba; Frank País Airport; Juan Gualberto Gómez Airport; Curaçao; Hato International Airport; Dominican Republic; Gregorio Luperón International Airport; Punta Cana International Airport; Jamaica; Sangster International Airport; Mexico; Cancún International Airport; Suriname; Johan Adolf Pengel International Airport; United States of America; Miami International Airport; Orlando Sanford International Airport |
| Tunisair | Tunisia Tunis–Carthage International Airport | Canada; Montréal–Pierre Elliott Trudeau International Airport |
| Virgin Atlantic | United Kingdom London-Heathrow London-Gatwick Manchester Airport | United States of America Boston-Logan International Airport Las Vegas McCarran Airport Los Angeles International Airport; Miami International Airport Newark Liberty International Airport; John F. Kennedy International Airport Orlando International Airport San Francisco International Airport Seattle–Tacoma International Airport; Washington Dulles International Airport |
| WestJet | Canada Calgary International Airport; St. John's International Airport | United Kingdom; London-Heathrow Seasonal: (Republic of Ireland) IrelandDublin (Scotland) Edinburgh (Scotland) Glasgow (England) London-Gatwick |
