= Timeline of aviation in the 18th century =

Timeline
of aviation
pre-18th century
18th century
19th century
20th century
21st century begins

This is a list of aviation-related events during the 18th century (January 1, 1701 – December 31, 1800):

== 1700s–1770s ==
- 1709
  - Portuguese Father Bartolomeu de Gusmão demonstrates a practical model of a hot-air balloon made of a paper envelope with burning material suspended below it to King John V of Portugal in the Ambassador's drawing room. Worried that it will set fire to the curtains, servants end its flight by dashing it to the ground. It is the first known demonstration of a practical lighter-than-air craft.
- 1716
  - Well thought-out glider-project of the Swedish scholar Emanuel Swedenborg. Basis for his construction are bird flight and the glider kite.
- 1738
  - In his Hydrodynamica the Swiss scholar Daniel Bernoulli (1700–1782) formulates the principle of the conservation of energy for fluids (Bernoulli's principle), the relationship between pressure and velocity in a flow.
- 1746
  - English military engineer Benjamin Robins (1707–1751) invented a whirling arm centrifuge to determine drag.
- 1766
  - British chemist Henry Cavendish determines the specific weight of hydrogen gas.

== 1780s–1790s ==
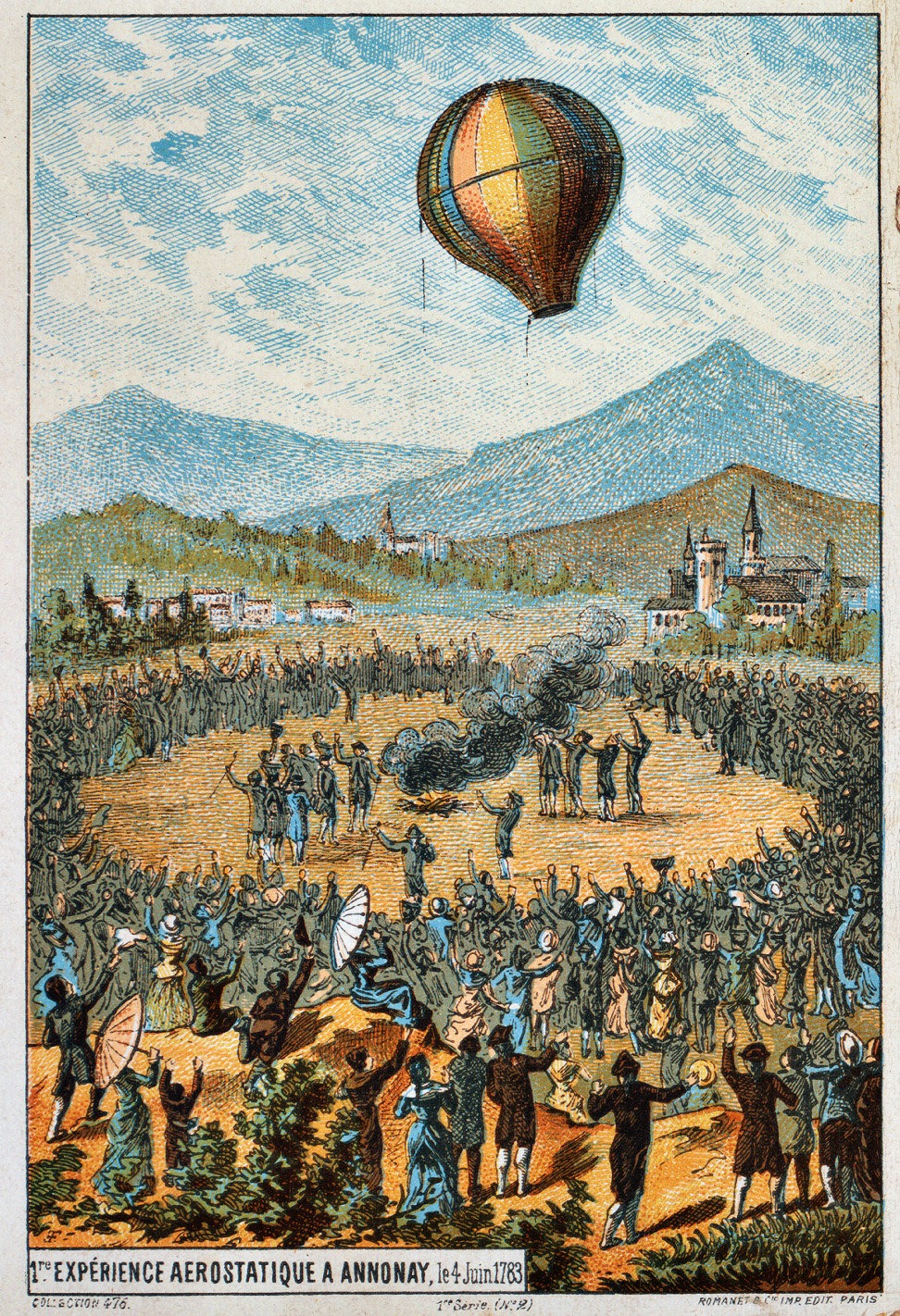
1783: First flight at Annonay.

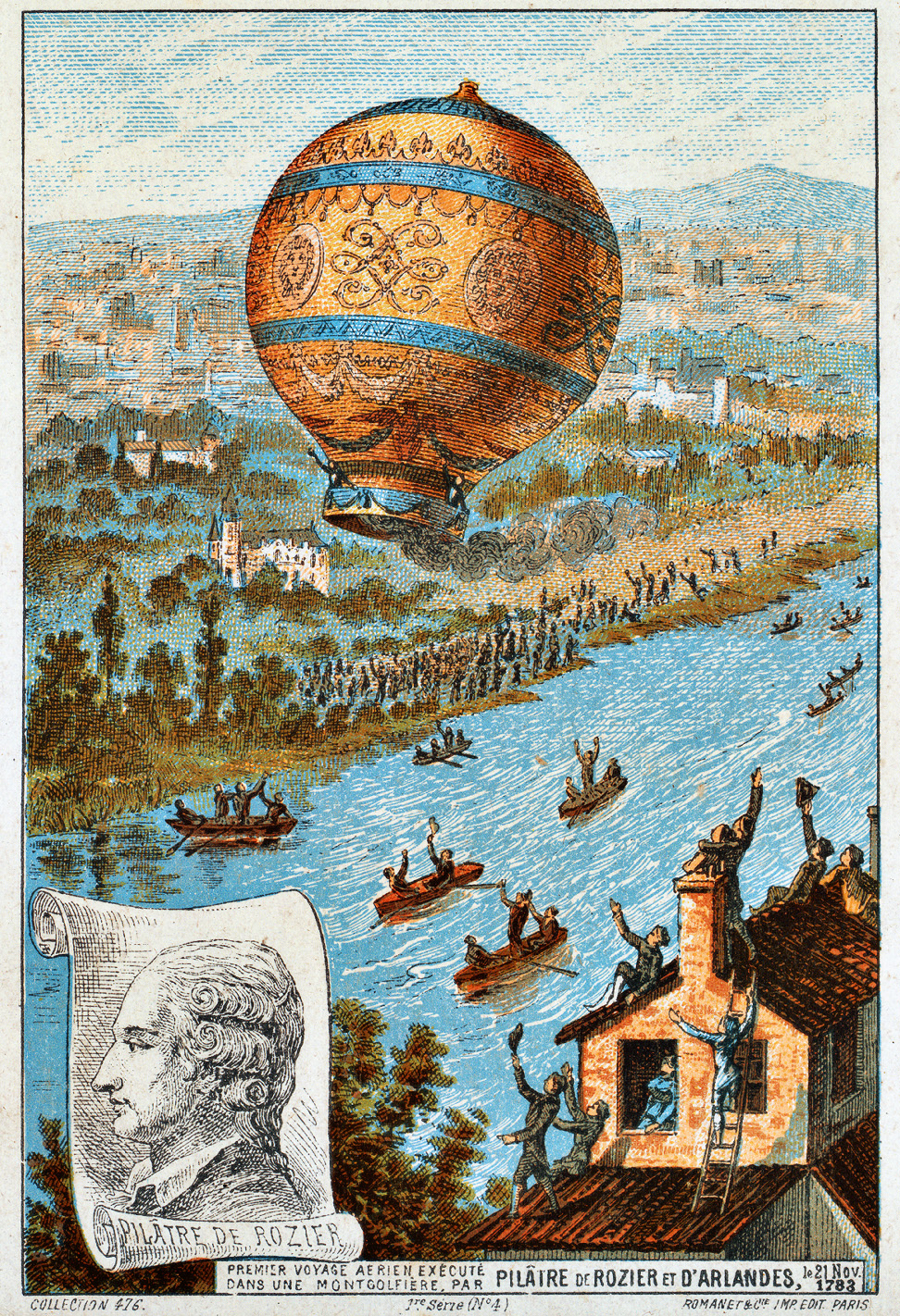
1783: First manned voyage at Paris.

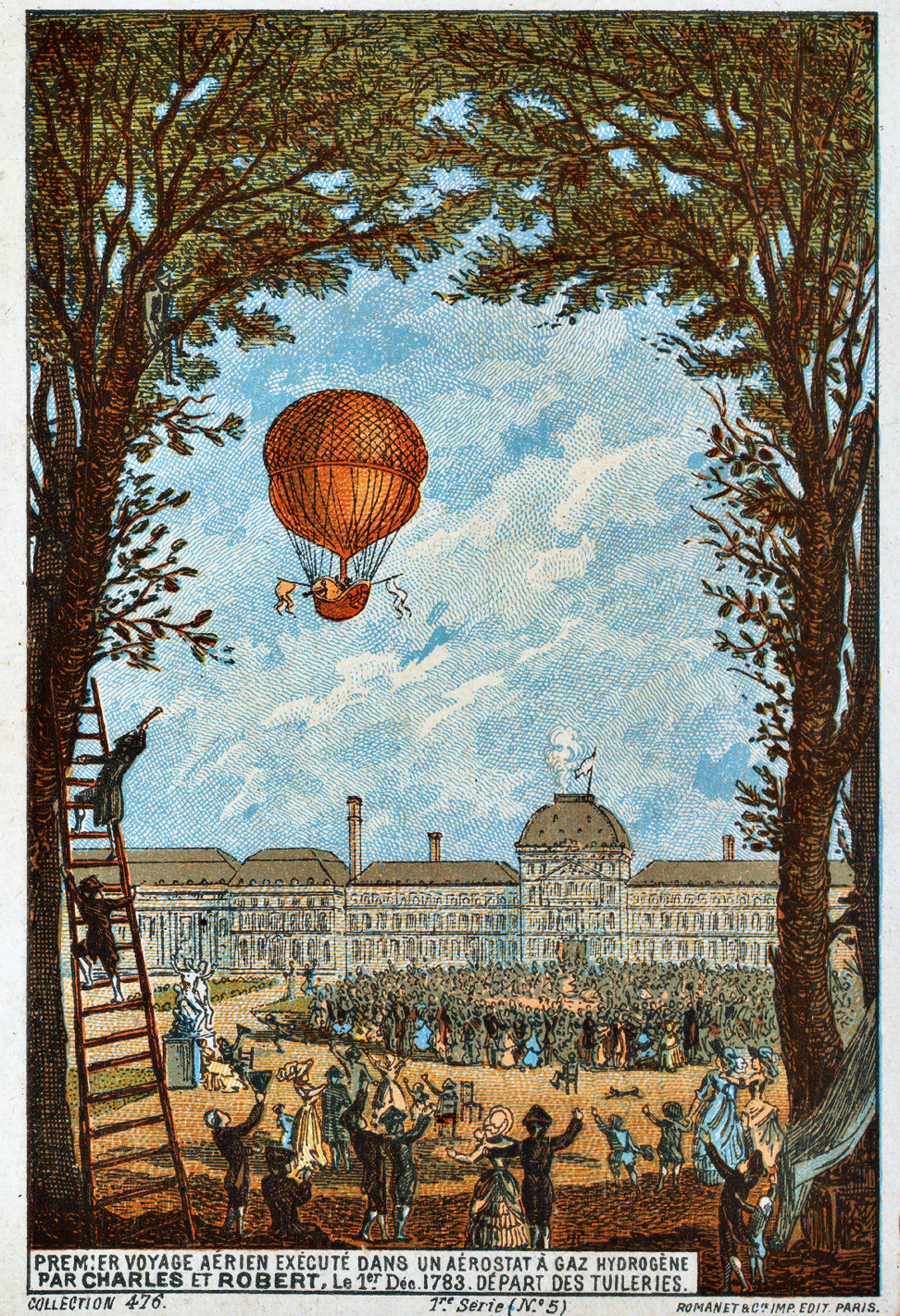
1783: First gas balloon flight.

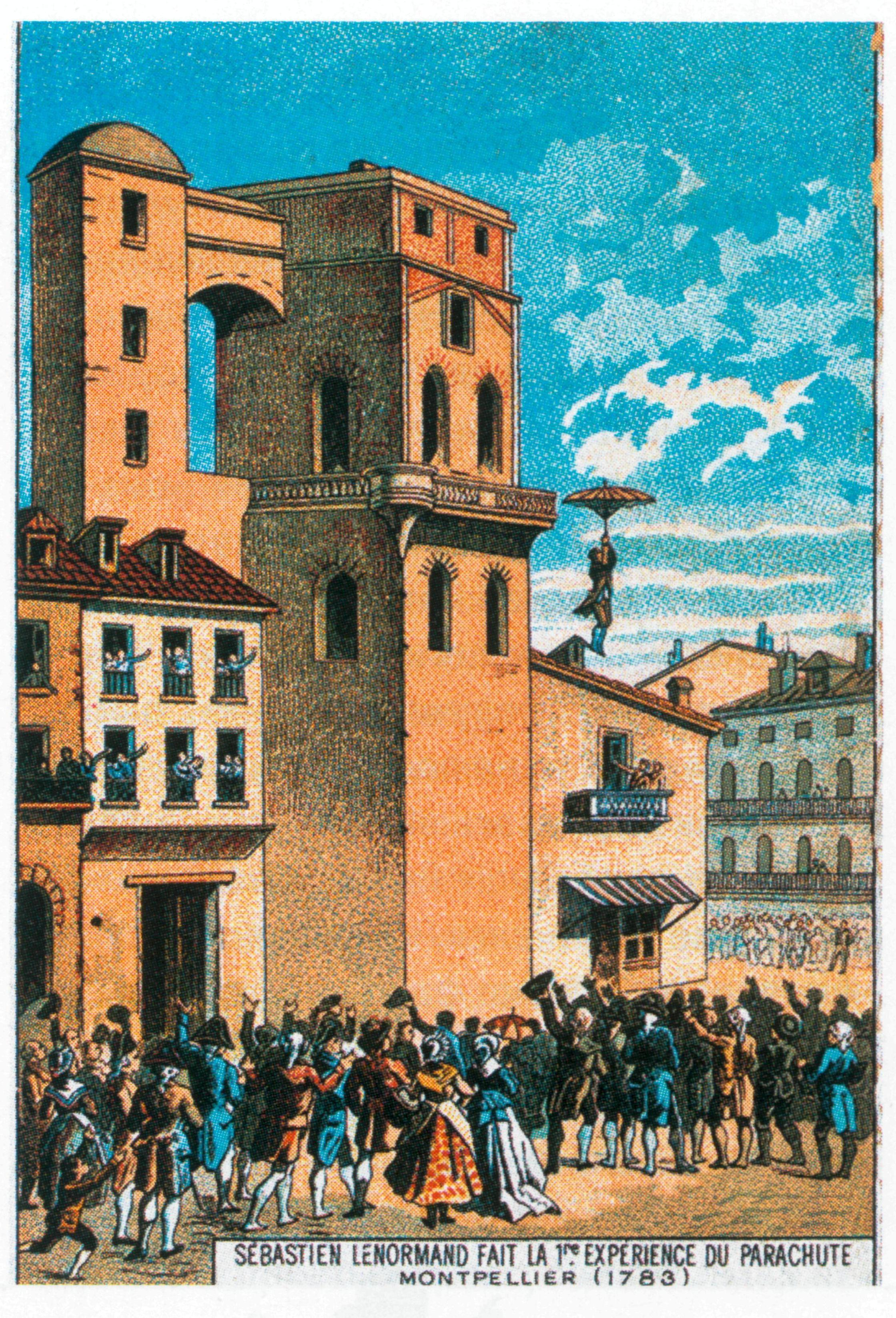
1783: Sebastian Lenormand performs a parachute jump.

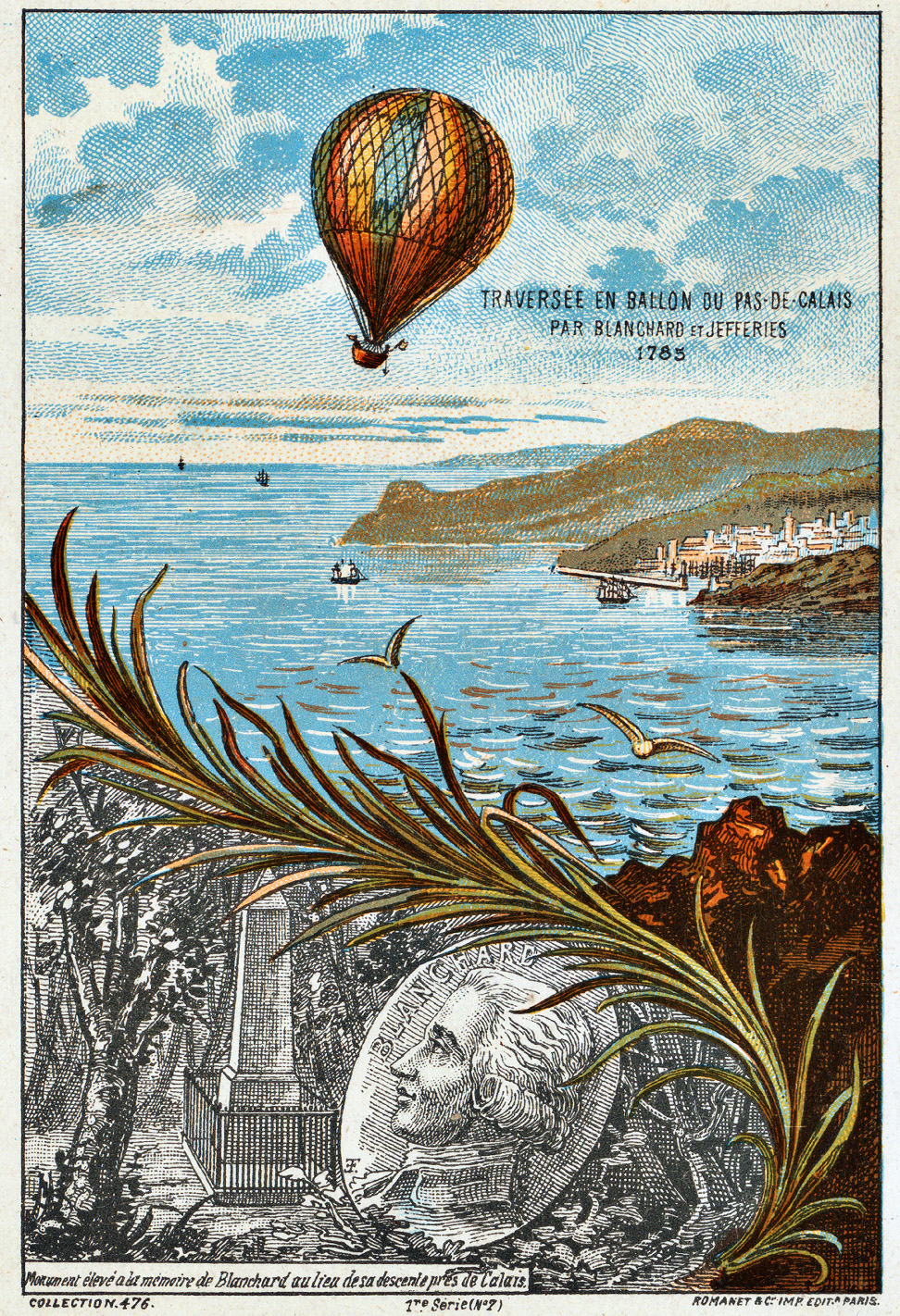
1785: First crossing of the Channel.

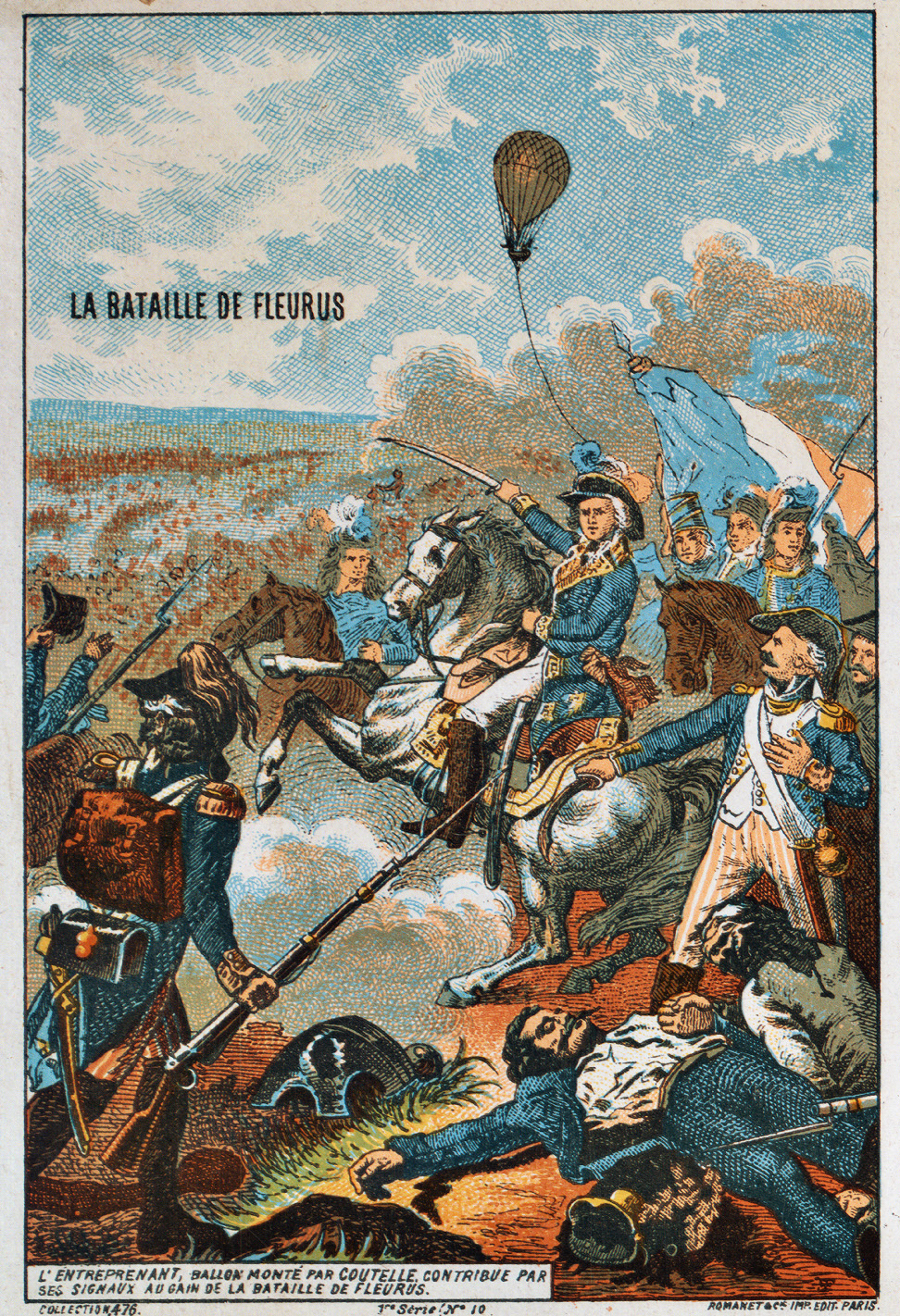
1794: First use in battle.

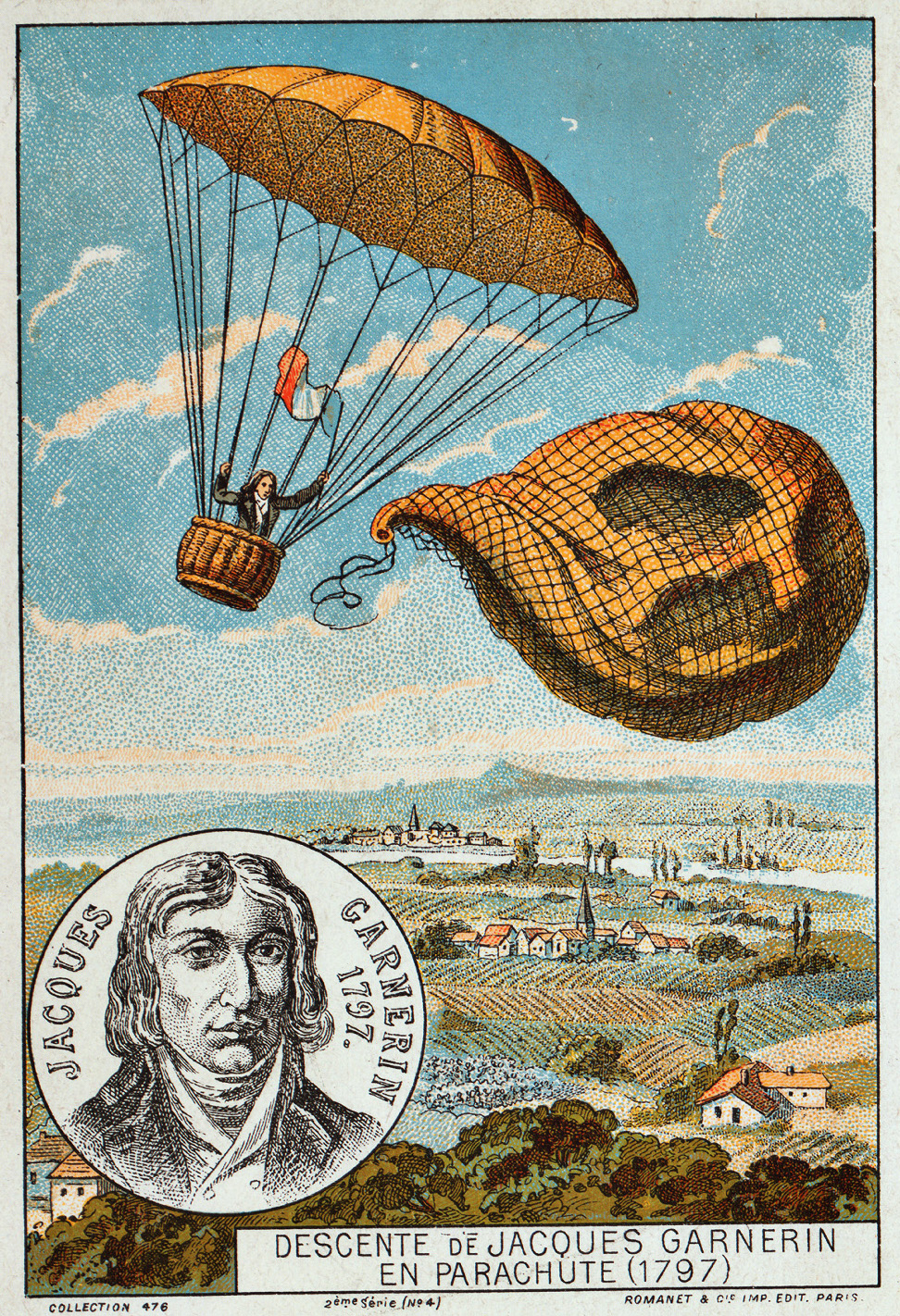
1797: First high-altitude parachute jump from a balloon.

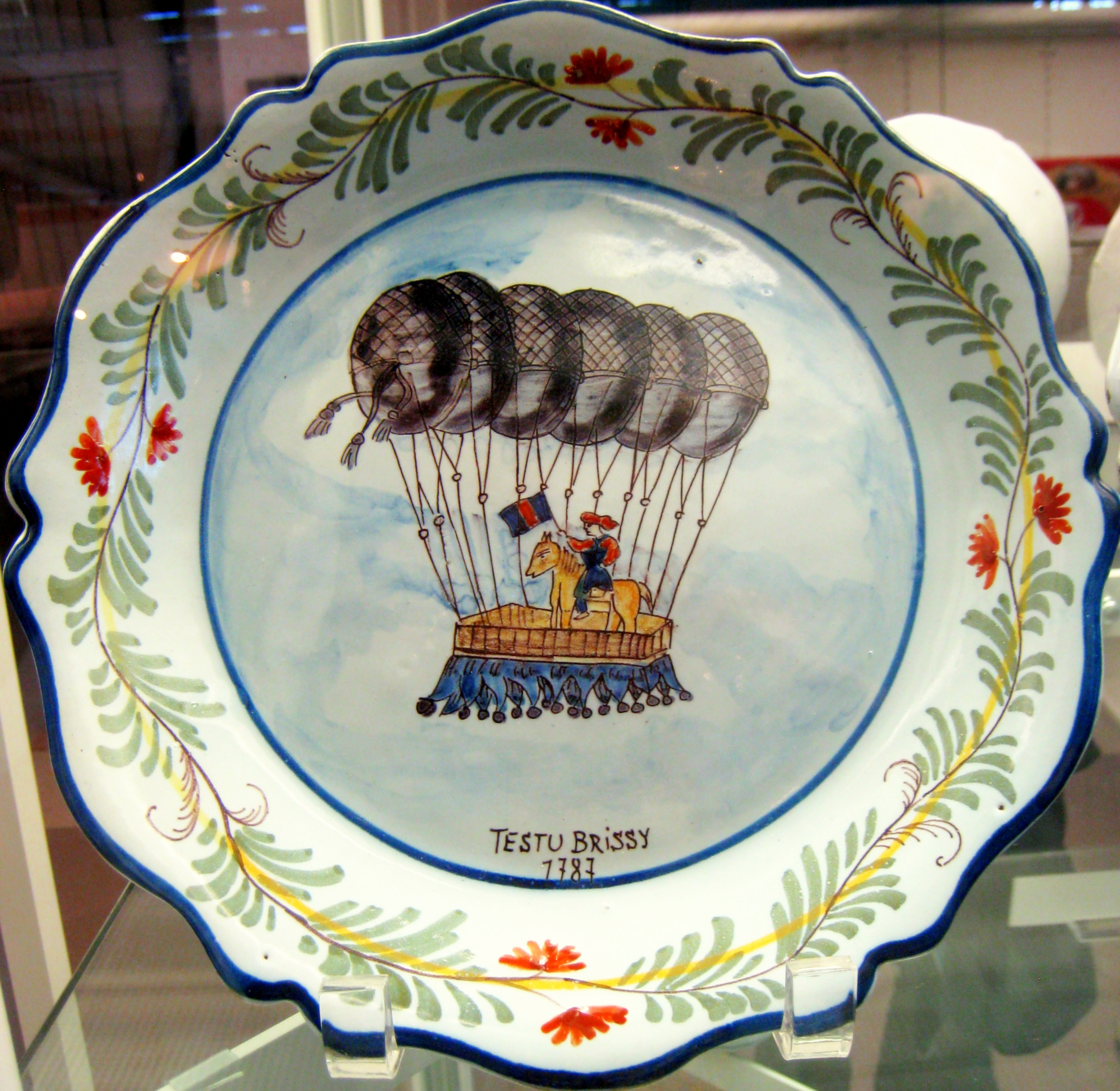
Pierre Testu-Brissy on Air Horse One (c.1798)

- 1782
  - December 14, The Montgolfier brothers first test fly an unmanned hot air balloon in France; it floats nearly 2 km (1.2 mi).
- 1783
  - June 4, Unmanned flight of the Montgolfier brothers 900 m linen hot air balloon at Annonay near Lyon in the Vivarais region of France as a public demonstration. The flight covers 2 km and lasts 10 minutes, to an estimated altitude of 1600–2000 metres.
  - August 27, Flight of Le Globe, an unmanned experimental hydrogen balloon, in Paris (built by Professor Charles and the Robert brothers). It flies 25 km (16 mi) from Paris to Gonesse and is destroyed by frightened peasants.
  - September 19, the Montgolfiers launch a sheep, duck and rooster in a hot-air balloon in a demonstration for King Louis XVI. The balloon rises some 500 m (1,600 ft) and returns the animals unharmed to the ground.
  - October 15, Pilâtre de Rozier and Marquis d'Arlandes rise into the air in a Montgolfière tethered to the ground in Paris. de Rozier becomes the first human passenger in a hot-air balloon, rising 26 m (85 ft).
  - November 21, In a flight lasting 25 minutes, de Rozier and d'Arlandes take the first untethered ride in a Montgolfière in Paris, the first human passengers carried in free flight by a hot-air balloon.
  - December 1, Jacques Charles and his assistant Nicolas-Louis Robert make the first flight in a hydrogen-filled gas balloon. They travel from Paris to Nesles-la-Vallée, a distance of 43 km (27 mi). On his second flight the same day, Charles reaches an altitude of about 3,000 meters (9,800 feet) over Nesles-la-Vallée.
  - December 26, Louis-Sébastien Lenormand makes the first ever recorded public demonstration of a parachute descent by jumping from the tower of the Montpellier observatory in France using his rigid-framed model which he intends as a form of fire escape.
- 1784
  - February 25, The first ascent of a manned balloon in Italy takes place with a hot air balloon carrying Paolo Andreani and two of its builders, the Gerli brothers.
  - March 2, Jean-Pierre Blanchard makes his first flight in a hydrogen balloon.
  - March 13 The first public ascent of a manned balloon in Italy takes place with a hot air balloon at the Villa Sormani in Moncucco carrying Paolo Andreani and two locals.
  - April 15, The first ascent of a manned balloon in the British Isles takes place with a hot air balloon at Navan in Ireland.
  - June 4, Élisabeth Thible becomes the first woman passenger in a hot-air balloon, at Lyon in France.
  - August 25 & 27, Scottish apothecary James Tytler makes the first balloon ascents in Great Britain, in a hot air balloon from Edinburgh.
  - September 15, Italian Vincenzo Lunardi makes the first hydrogen balloon flight in Britain, from Moorfields in London to South Mimms.
  - September 19, Anne-Jean Robert, Nicolas-Louis Robert and Colin Hullin fly La Carolina, a hydrogen balloon, 186 km (116 mi) from Paris to Beuvry.
  - October 4, Englishman James Sadler makes the first hot air balloon flight in England, from Oxford to Woodeaton.
  - October 16, Jean-Pierre Blanchard fits a hand-powered propeller to a balloon flow from London, the first recorded means of propulsion carried aloft.
  - Pilâtre de Rozier and the chemist Proust rise with a Montgolfière up to 4,000 meters (13,000 feet).
  - Jean Baptiste Meusnier makes an oblong balloon to explore unknown areas, with an airscrew driven by muscle power.
- 1785
  - January 7, Jean-Pierre Blanchard makes the first flight across the English Channel. He uses a hydrogen balloon and carries John Jeffries as a passenger, flying from Dover, England, to Guînes, France.
  - January 19, Richard Crosbie successfully flies in a hot air balloon from Ranelagh Gardens to Clontarf, Dublin, Ireland. He goes on to makes several unsuccessful attempts to cross the Irish Sea in a hydrogen-filled balloon.
  - May 10, A hot air balloon collides with a chimney in Tullamore in Ireland, setting light to around 100 houses in the town centre.
  - June 15, Pilâtre de Rozier and Pierre Jules Romain become the first known aeronautical fatalities when their balloon crashes during an attempt to cross the English Channel.
  - October 5, Vincenzo Lunardi flies in a gas balloon from George Heriot's School, Edinburgh, across the Firth of Forth in Scotland to Ceres, Fife (51.5 km (32.0 mi) in 1.5 hrs).
  - November 23, Lunardi flies from St Andrew's Square, Glasgow, to Hawick in Scotland.
  - Ukita Kōkichi, Japanese paperhanger, makes artificial wings and tries flying from the top of a bridge.
- 1789
  - First experiments in Japan to develop an ornithopter-type glider.
- 1793
  - Military use of a captive balloon at the siege of Mainz, Germany.
  - January 9, Jean-Pierre Blanchard makes probably the first balloon ascent in the Western Hemisphere, lifting off from the prison yard at the Walnut Street Jail in Philadelphia, Pennsylvania, crossing the Delaware River and landing at Deptford, New Jersey, carrying an "aerial passport" endorsed by President George Washington. Washington, John Adams, Thomas Jefferson, James Madison and James Monroe all witness the flight.
  - May 15, inventor Diego Marín Aguilera, the "father of aviation" in Spain, flies a glider for about 360 m (1,180 ft).
  - July 30, Jean-Marie-Joseph Coutelle, Louis-Bernard Guyton de Morveau and Antoine-Laurent de Lavoisier complete a military hydrogen balloon ordered by the French Committee of Public Safety. They will present it to the committee in October 1793.
  - November 24, French authorities order Nicolas J. Conte to construct a military balloon capable of lifting two passengers to an altitude of 1,700 feet (520 meters).
- 1794
  - April 2, The French National Convention establishes the 50-man Company of Aeronauts, the first airship company in the French Army. It is commanded by Captain Jean-Marie-Joseph Coutelle.
  - May 3, After completing its training, the Company of Aeronauts is assigned to the French Army of Sambre-et-Meuse for operational employment.
  - June 2, The first military aviation sortie in history takes place when the French Company of Aeronauts' balloon l'Entreprenant ("Enterprise") ascends for a reconnaissance of Austrian forces besieging Maubeuge. Austrian artillery fires at the balloon but fails to hit it before it rises out of range.
  - June 23, The French balloon l'Entreprenant resumes flights, helping to prevent Austrian troops from relieving besieged Austrian forces at Charleroi. On the same day, the Committee of Public Safety authorizes the formation of a second balloon company in the French Army.
  - June 26, Jean-Marie-Joseph Coutelle and Major General Antoine Morlot spend nine hours aloft in the balloon l'Entreprenant during the Battle of Fleurus, providing observation that contributes to a French victory over Austrian forces. It is the first battle in history to be affected by aerial observation.
- 1795
  - October 29, Observation balloons used in Battle of Mainz.
- 1797
  - October 22, André-Jacques Garnerin jumps from a balloon from 975 meters (3,199 feet) over Parc Monceau in Paris in a 7-meter (23-foot)-) diameter parachute made of white canvas with a basket attached. He is declared "official French aeronaut of the state".
- 1798
  - At least one balloon of the French army's Company of Aeronauts is transported aboard the French Navy warship Le Patriote for use ashore in conducting a reconnaissance of the coast of Egypt, but Le Patriote strikes a rock and sinks off Alexandria, Egypt, on July 4.
  - August 1, The French ship-of-the-line Orient has gear of the French Army's Company of Aeronauts on board when she is destroyed during the Battle of the Nile.
  - October 15, First balloon ascent on horseback: Pierre Testu-Brissy ascends from Bellevue, Meudon in Paris.
- 1799
  - Englishman Sir George Cayley (1773–1857) sketches a glider with a rudder unit and an elevator unit. His manuscript is considered to be the starting point of the scientific research on heavier than air flying machines. It is Cayley who helps to sort out the confusion of the time. ..."He knew more than any of his predecessors ... and successors up to the end of the 19th century." – Orville Wright.
  - Birth of John Stringfellow, another English pioneer of heavier than air flying machines (d. 1883).
  - January 15, The French Army's Company of Aeronauts is abolished.
  - October 12, Jeanne Geneviève Labrosse becomes the first woman to jump from a balloon with a parachute, from an altitude of 900 m.

== See also ==
- Timeline of aviation – 19th century
