= Pierre Testu-Brissy =

French balloonist (1770–1829)

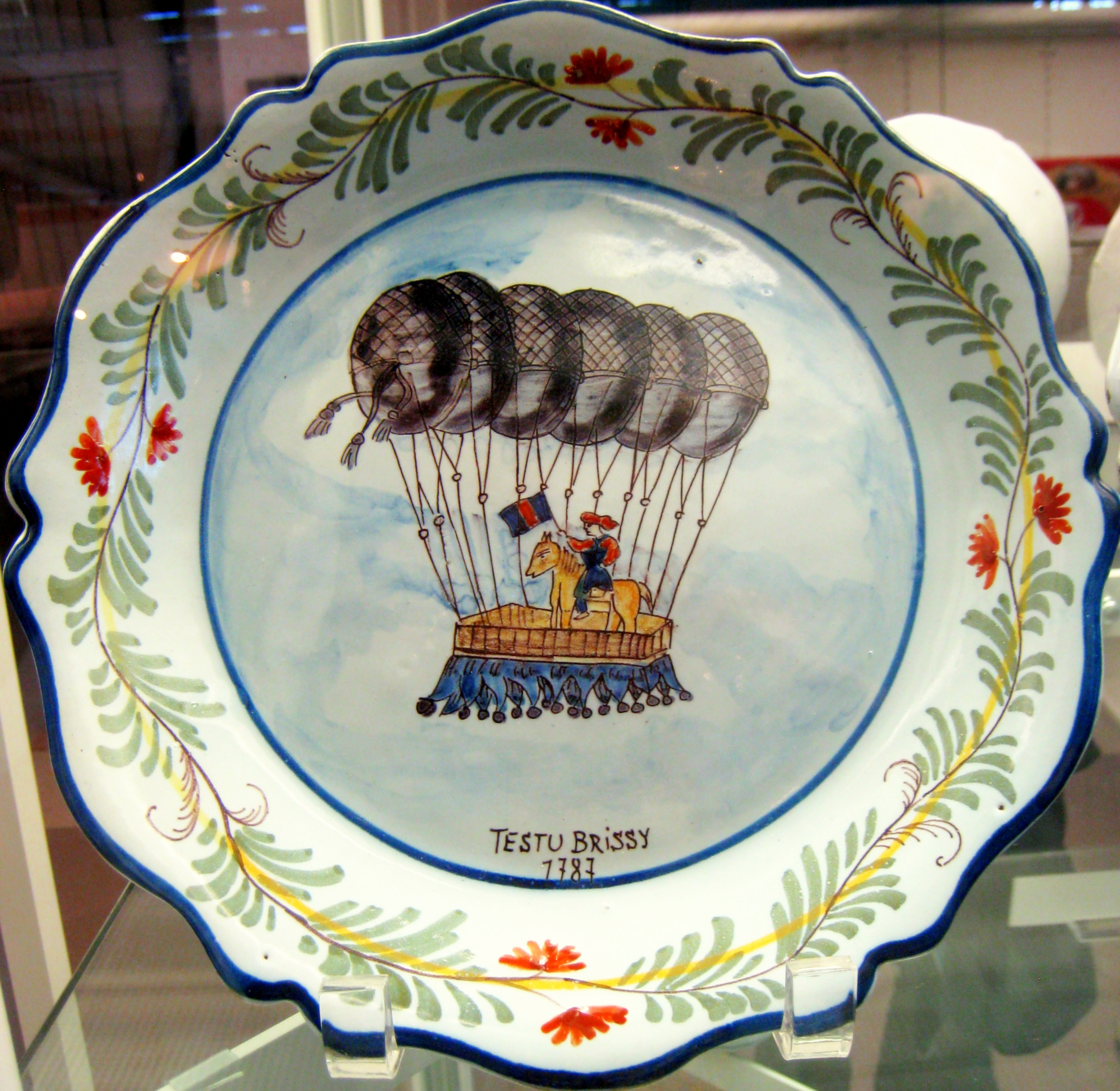
- Pierre Testu-Brissy on a dish
- Born: 1770
- Died: 1829 (aged 58–59)
- Occupation: Balloonist

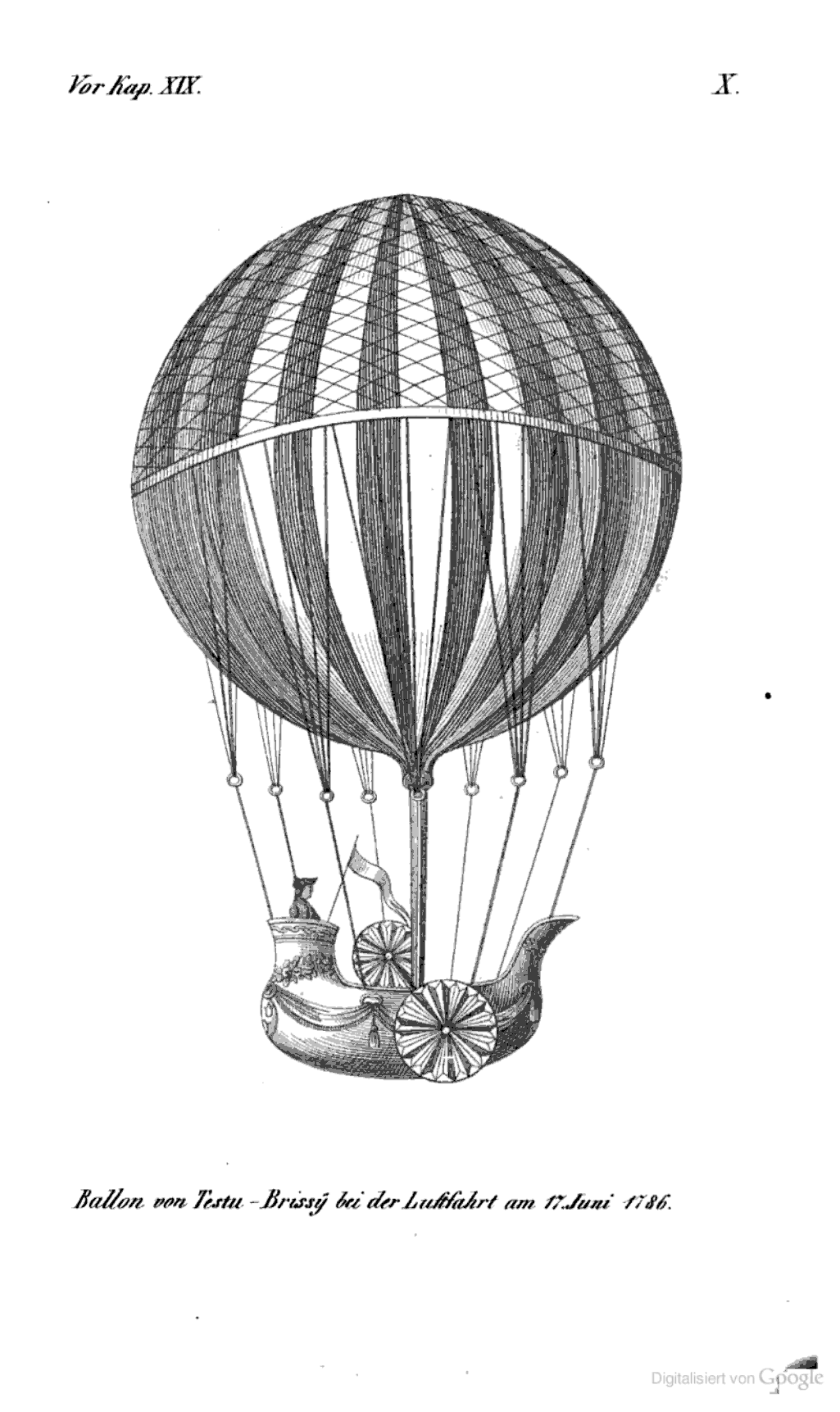
Early flight by Testu-Brissy, c. 1786

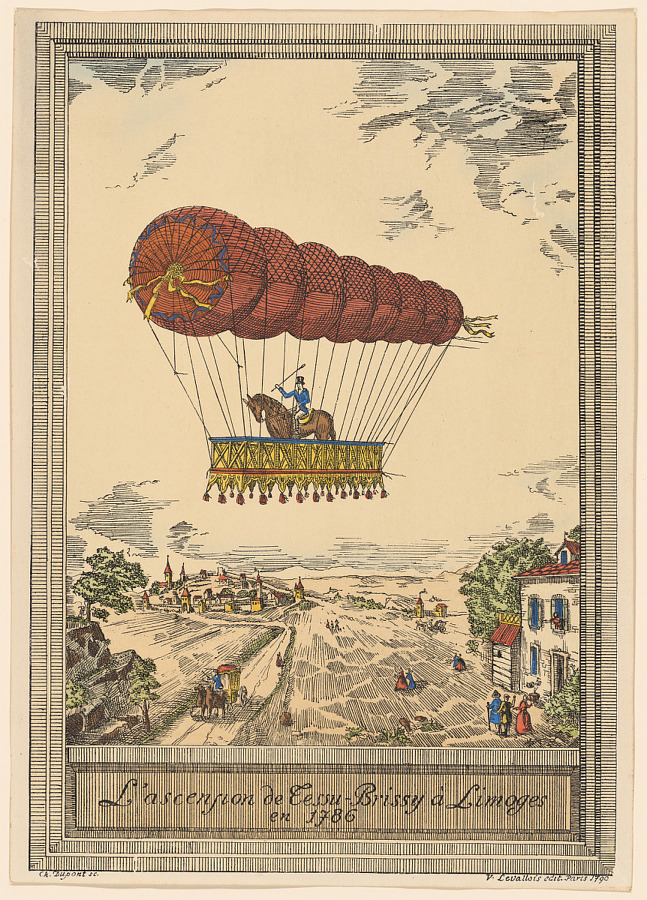
Testu-Brissy astride his horse near Limoges. (Smithsonian Collection)

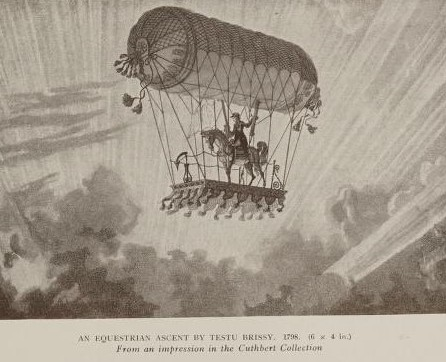
Testu Brissy with Hydrogen Balloon at Meudon, Paris 1798

Pierre Testu-Brissy (or possibly Tessu-Brissy) (1770? – 1829) was a pioneering French balloonist who achieved fame for making flights astride his horse.

== Career ==
Testu-Brissy made his first balloon ascent in 1785 or 1786, and the first night ascent on 11 May or 18 June 1786 in a hydrogen balloon. He subsequently undertook more than 50 flights in his lifetime.

Gaston Tissandier's Histoire des ballons et des aéronautes célèbres (History of famous balloons and aeronauts) (published in 1887) described Testu-Brissy's earliest ballooning thus : (Note: Histoire des ballons et des aéronautes célèbres by Gaston Tissandier Page 289, 290 : Pendant les dernières anne'es du xvme siècle, en outre des admirables applications que des hommes de cœur et de patriotisme avaient su faire des aérostats aux opérations militaires, les ballons continuèrent aussi à contribuer à l'animation des fêtes nationales ou militaires. Trois ans avant la Révolution, I un nouvel aéronaute avait fait son apparition en la personne de Testu-Brissy, qui se donnait le titre de physicien et qui avait annoncé une ascension de longue durée. Le projet du voyageur aérien était de séjourner vingt-quatre heures dans l'atmosphère au moyen d'un ballon à gaz hydrogène, muni d'un système de rames à la façon de celles qu'avait employées Blanchard.; La première ascension de Testu-Brissy eut lieu le 18 juin 1786, des jardins du Luxembourg, où il s'éleva à quatre heures cinquante de l'après-midi. Après une première descente dans la plaine de Montmorency, Paéronaute repartit, pour revenir encore près de terre à huit heures du soir, entre Ecouen et Wariville, d'où il s'éleva de nouveau.)

During the last years of the eighteenth century, besides the military applications by men of heart and patriotism, balloons continued to contribute to national and military festivals. Three years before the Revolution, Testu-Brissy, a new aeronaut, gave himself the title of physicist and announced plans for a twenty-four hour balloon flight, using a hydrogen balloon with oars similar to Jean-Pierre Blanchard.

He also described his first ascent, thus:

The first ascent by Testu-Brissy took place on June 18, 1786, at 4.50 pm, from the Jardin du Luxembourg to the plain of Montmorency, Val-d'Oise (approximately 15 kilometres (9.3 mi) north). He then set off again and landed around 8 pm between Écouen and Wariville (near Litz, Oise circa 45 kilometres (28 mi) north).

=== Scientific experimentation ===
On 18 June 1786 he flew for 11 hours and made the first electrical observations as he ascended into thunderclouds. He stated that he drew remarkable discharges from the clouds by means of an iron rod carried in the basket. He also experienced Saint Elmo's Fire, a phenomenon in which luminous plasma is created by a corona discharge from a rod-like object in an atmospheric electric field.

=== Damage compensation ===
In 1786 Testu-Brissy was the first man who was called upon to pay damages for crops which had been trampled (mostly) by the rustics who flocked to see him.

=== Equestrian ballooning ===
On 15 October 1798 in Paris, Testu-Brissy completed the first balloon flight on horseback, ascending from Bellevue, Meudon (Château de Bellevue). The horse, which had been trained to stand perfectly still regardless of surrounding activities, endured bleeding from its nose and ears due to the altitude.

Gaston Tissandier's Histoire des ballons et des aéronautes célèbres (History of famous balloons and aeronauts) described Testu-Brissy's equestrian ballooning thus : (Note: Histoire des ballons et des aéronautes célèbres by Gaston Tissandier. Page 294 : Pendant les premiers jours du Consulat, les ascensions fo- raines reprirent quelque faveur auprès du public, et c'est en 1798 que Testu-Brissy exécuta une ascension équestre restée célèbre. L'aéronaute avait construit un aérostat allongé au-dessous duquel était fixé un grand plateau de bois rectangulaire. Il annonça qu'il s'élèverait à cheval sur ce plateau, sans que sa monture fût attachée. Le 26 vendémiaire de l'an VII, Testu-Brissy s'éleva à Bellevue; mais le succès ne répondit d'abord pas à son attente. L'expérience fut recommencée quelques jours plus tard, et cette fois elle réussit au delà de toutes les espérances. L'aéronaute alla tomber dans les plaines de Nanterre, après avoir affirmé que le cheval qu'il montait avait perdu du sang par les narines et les oreilles, à une hauteur où il ne s'était pas trouvé incommodé.)

During the first days of the revolutionary Consulate, balloon ascents regained some favour with the public. Thus on 26 Vendémiaire of year VII (in the French Republican calendar : Autumn, 26 Grape harvest, equivalent to October 17th, 1798) Testu-Brissy performed an equestrian balloon ascent which has remained famous. He had built an elongated balloon to carry a large rectangular wooden platform where he sat astride his horse without it being tethered. Testu-Brissy ascended at Bellevue; but the experiment did not meet his expectations, so he tried again a few days later and succeeded beyond expectations. He landed on the plain of Nanterre and said that the horse had lost blood through its nostrils and ears.

== Contradictory dates ==
This article currently shows contradictions between sources regarding dates.

- Tetsu-Brissy's first flight is loosely reported by some sources as 1785 (First B-Ascent 1785; First B-Solo 18 Sep.1791 from Paris) or June 18, 1786, at 4.50 pm, from the Jardin du Luxembourg to the plain of Montmorency, Val-d'Oise.
- Tetsu-Brissy's 11 hour flight (night flight?) is reported by some sources as 11 May or 18 June 1786 from Paris.
- Tetsu-Brissy's equestrian stunt flight is loosely reported by some sources as 1786 (L'ascension de Cessu-Brissy à Limoges en 1786 Smithsonian image), or 1787 (Image on French plate from the 1800s), or 15 Oct.1798 or October 17, 1798 (26 Vendémiaire of year VII).

== See also ==
- History of ballooning
- List of firsts in aviation
- Timeline of aviation - 18th century
- Jean-Pierre Blanchard
- Jacques Charles
- André-Jacques Garnerin
- Citoyenne Henri
- Nicolas-Louis Robert see (Les Frères Robert)
- Jean-François Pilâtre de Rozier, the first manned balloon flight using a Montgolfier hot-air balloon
