= Edward Smith (VC) =

Recipient of the Victoria Cross

Edward Benn Smith
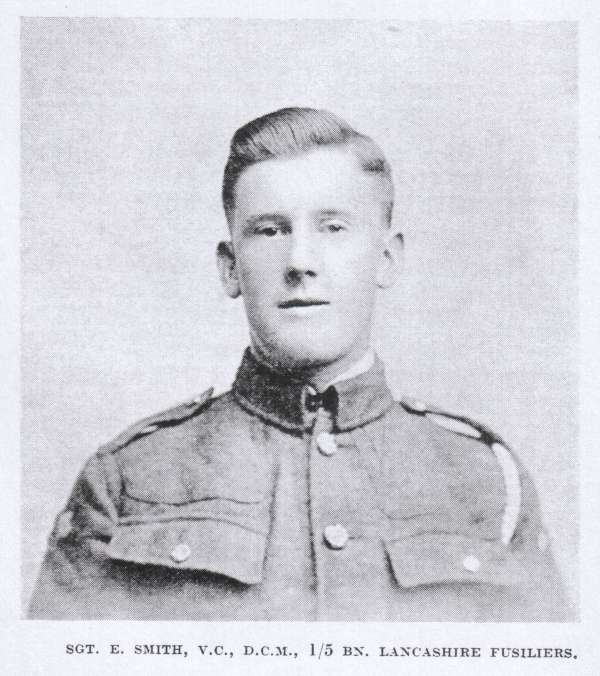
- Born: 10 November 1898; Maryport, Cumberland
- Died: 12 January 1940 (aged 41); Bucquoy, France
- Burial place: Beuvry Communal Cemetery Extension
- Relatives: Mother Martha Benn Father Charles Henry Smith
- Military career
- Allegiance: United Kingdom
- Branch: British Army
- Service years: 1918–1938; 1939–1940
- Rank: Lieutenant
- Units: Lancashire Fusiliers
- Conflicts: First World War: Hundred Days Offensive; Second World War †
- Awards: Victoria Cross; Distinguished Conduct Medal

Edward Benn ('Ned') Smith VC, DCM (10 November 1898 – 12 January 1940) was an English recipient of the Victoria Cross, the highest and most prestigious award for gallantry in the face of the enemy that can be awarded to British and Commonwealth forces.

== World War I ==
He is unusual in having gained both the DCM and VC, and in quick succession, during the Hundred Days Offensive.

=== Distinguished Conduct Medal ===
On 10 August 1918, then a Corporal with the 1/5th Battalion, Lancashire Fusiliers, Smith was leading a daylight patrol near Hébuterne in the Somme Area of France to examine points in the German lines where information was required. As the patrol was about to retire, he saw a party of about 40 Germans about to take up outpost duty. Despite being heavily outnumbered by the German soldiers, Smith led his small party of men and engaged the enemy, breaking up the German party and causing severe casualties. As well as receiving the Distinguished Conduct Medal for this action, he was promoted to the rank of lance sergeant.

=== Victoria Cross ===
Eleven days later, during the period 21/23 August 1918, east of Serre, France, Smith while in command of a platoon, took a machine-gun post at The Lozenge (Hill 140), rushing the garrison with his rifle and bayonet. The enemy on seeing him coming, scattered to throw hand grenades at him, but heedless of all danger and almost without halting in his rush, he shot at least six of them. Later, seeing another platoon needing assistance, he led his men to them, took command and captured the objective. During an enemy counter-attack the following day he led a section forward and restored a portion of the line. According to The London Gazette Supplement of 18 October 1918, "His personal bravery, skill and initiative were outstanding, and his conduct throughout an inspiring example to all."

== Interwar ==
According to The Whitehaven News, a local West Cumbrian newspaper, when he returned to his home town of Maryport after the war in 1919, he was greeted by a cheering crowd of 6,000 people, equivalent to the town's total population at the time. Another local newspaper described Smith in the following terms:

Sergeant Smith is not only a VC but looks it. He is a British soldier every inch of him. He is an A1 man from the crown of his head to the soles of his feet. ... He has not only won the VC but he has a chest on which to display it.

He continued serving, from 1918 to 1938, in China, Malaya and Ireland, before retiring with an Army pension having attained the rank of Regimental Sergeant Major. He then joined the Corps of Commissionaires in London for about a year.

In 1921, he attended a Garden Party held at Buckingham Palace by King George V of the United Kingdom for Victoria Cross holders, as the youngest recipient present. He never married.

== World War II ==
As war loomed in summer 1939, he re-enlisted with his former Regiment, the Lancashire Fusiliers, and was among the first contingent of the British Expeditionary Force to sail for France.

He was a Lieutenant and quartermaster when he died in France from a gunshot wound in the head on 12 January 1940, just under four months before the start of the Battle of France in May. Smith is buried at the Commonwealth War Graves Commission cemetery of Beuvry Communal Cemetery Extension.

== Bibliography ==
- Gliddon, Gerald (2014) [2002]. Road to Victory 1918. VCs of the First World War. The History Press. ISBN 978-0750953610.
- Whitworth, Alan (2015). VCs of the North: Cumbria, Durham & Northumberland. Pen and Sword Books. ISBN 978-1473848221.
