= Jacques Charles =

French inventor, scientist and mathematician (1746–1823)

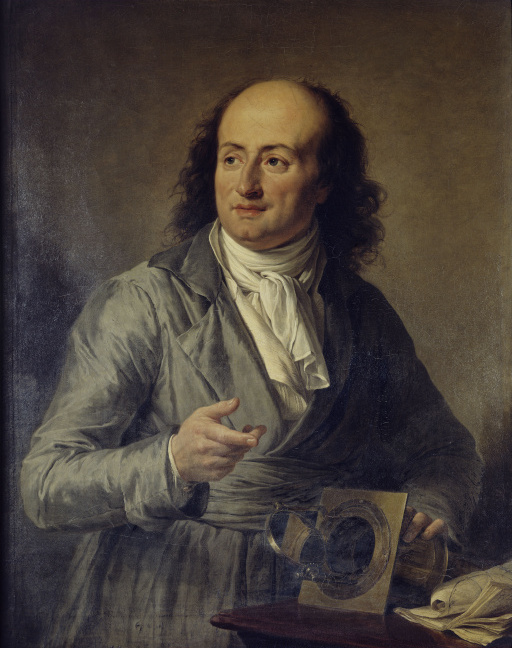
- Portrait by Adélaïde Labille-Guiard, c. 1798
- Born: 12 November 1746; Beaugency, France
- Died: 7 April 1823 (aged 76); Paris, France
- Known for: Charles's law
- Scientific career
- Fields: Physics mathematics hot air ballooning
- Workplaces: Académie des Sciences

Jacques Alexandre César Charles (French pronunciation: [ʒak alɛksɑ̃dʁ sezaʁ ʃaʁl]; 12 November 1746 – 7 April 1823) was a French inventor, scientist, and balloonist. Charles wrote almost nothing about mathematics, and most of what has been credited to him was due to mistaking him with another Jacques Charles (sometimes called Charles the Geometer), also a member of the Paris Academy of Sciences, entering on 12 May 1785.

Charles and the Robert brothers launched the world's first hydrogen-filled gas balloon August 27, 1783; then December 1, 1783, Charles and his co-pilot Nicolas-Louis Robert ascended to a height of about 1,800 feet (550 m) in a piloted gas balloon. Their pioneering use of hydrogen for lift led to this type of gas balloon being named a Charlière (as opposed to the hot-air Montgolfière).

Charles's law, describing how gases tend to expand when heated, was formulated by Joseph Louis Gay-Lussac in 1802, but he credited it to unpublished work by Charles.

Charles was elected to the Académie des Sciences in 1795 and subsequently became professor of physics at the Académie de Sciences.

== Biography ==
Charles was born in Beaugency-sur-Loire in 1746. He married Julie Françoise Bouchaud des Hérettes (1784–1817), a creole woman 37 years younger than himself. Reportedly, the poet Alphonse de Lamartine also fell in love with her, and she was the inspiration for Elvire in his 1820 autobiographical Poetic Meditation "Le Lac" ("The Lake"), which describes in retrospect the fervent love shared by a couple from the point of view of the bereaved man. Charles outlived her and died in Paris on 7 April 1823.

== Hydrogen balloon flights ==
=== First hydrogen balloon ===
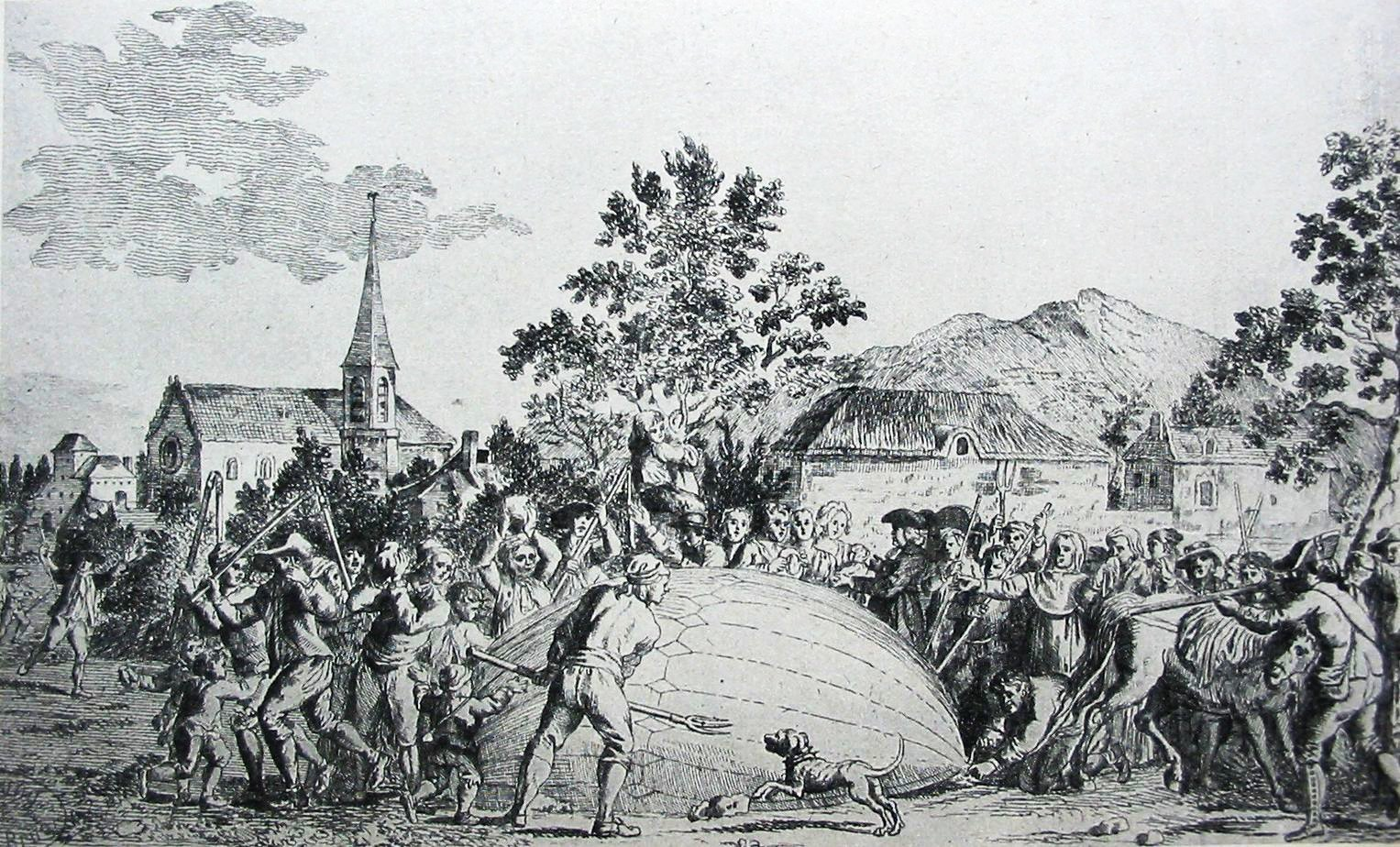
The balloon built by Charles and the Robert brothers is attacked by terrified villagers in Gonesse. Some of them even started attacking him because they weren't used to things flying.

Charles conceived the idea that hydrogen would be a suitable lifting agent for balloons having studied the work of Robert Boyle's Boyle's Law which was published 100 years earlier in 1662, and of his contemporaries Henry Cavendish, Joseph Black and Tiberius Cavallo. He designed the craft and then worked in conjunction with the Robert brothers, Anne-Jean and Nicolas-Louis, to build it in their workshop at the Place des Victoires in Paris. The brothers invented the methodology for the lightweight, airtight gas bag by dissolving rubber in a solution of turpentine and varnished the sheets of silk that were stitched together to make the main envelope. They used alternate strips of red and white silk, but the discolouration of the varnishing/rubberising process left a red and yellow result.

Charles and the Robert brothers launched the world's first hydrogen filled balloon on 27 August 1783, from the Champ de Mars, (now the site of the Eiffel Tower) where Ben Franklin was among the crowd of onlookers. The balloon was comparatively small, a 35 cubic metre sphere of rubberised silk, and only capable of lifting about 9 kg (20 lb). It was filled with hydrogen that had been made by pouring nearly a quarter of a tonne of sulphuric acid onto a half a tonne of scrap iron. The hydrogen gas was fed into the balloon via lead pipes; but as it was not passed through cold water, great difficulty was experienced in filling the balloon completely (the gas was hot when produced, but as it cooled in the balloon, it contracted). Daily progress bulletins were issued on the inflation; and the crowd was so great that on the 26th the balloon was moved secretly by night to the Champ de Mars, a distance of four kilometres.

The balloon flew northwards for 45 minutes, pursued by chasers on horseback, and landed 21 kilometers away in the village of Gonesse where the reportedly terrified local peasants destroyed it with pitchforks or knives. The project was funded by a subscription organised by Barthelemy Faujas de Saint-Fond.

=== First crewed hydrogen balloon flight ===
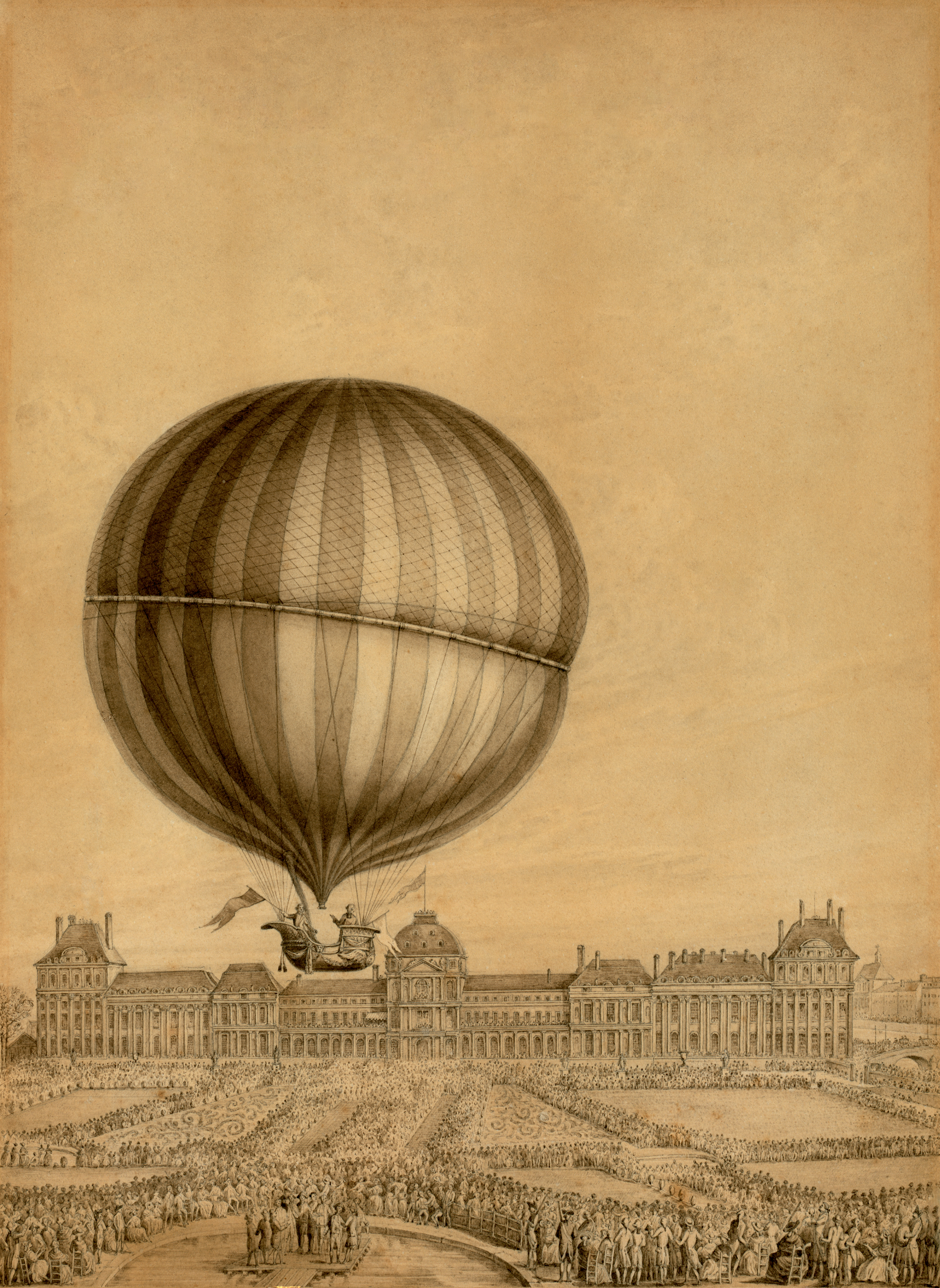
Contemporary illustration of the first flight by Charles with Nicolas-Louis Robert, 1 December 1783. Viewed from the Place de la Concorde to the Tuileries Palace (destroyed in 1871)

At 13:45 (1:45 PM) on 1 December 1783, Charles and the Robert brothers launched a new crewed balloon from the Jardin des Tuileries in Paris. Charles was accompanied by Nicolas-Louis Robert as co-pilot of the 380-cubic-metre, hydrogen-filled balloon. The envelope was fitted with a hydrogen release valve and was covered with a net from which the basket was suspended. Sand ballast was used to control altitude. They ascended to a height of about 1,800 feet (550 m) and landed at sunset in Nesles-la-Vallée after a 2-hour, 5-minute flight covering 36 km. The chasers on horseback, who were led by the Duc de Chartres, held down the craft while both Charles and Nicolas-Louis alighted.

Charles then decided to ascend again, but alone this time because the balloon had lost some of its hydrogen. This time it ascended rapidly to an altitude of about 3,000 metres, where he saw the sun again. He began suffering from aching pain in his ears so he "valved" to release gas, and descended to land gently about 3 km away at Tour du Lay. Unlike the Robert brothers, Charles never flew again, although a hydrogen balloon came to be called a Charlière in his honour.

It is reported that 400,000 spectators witnessed the launch, and that hundreds had paid one crown each to help finance the construction and receive access to a "special enclosure" for a "close-up view" of the take-off. Among the "special enclosure" crowd was Benjamin Franklin, the diplomatic representative of the United States of America. Also present was Joseph Montgolfier, whom Charles honoured by asking him to release the small, bright green, pilot balloon to assess the wind and weather conditions.

This event took place ten days after the world's first crewed balloon flight by Jean-François Pilâtre de Rozier using a Montgolfier brothers hot air balloon. Simon Schama wrote in Citizens:

Montgolfier's principal scientific collaborator was M. Charles, ... who had been the first to propose the gas produced by vitriol instead of the burning, dampened straw and wood that he had used in earlier flights. Charles himself was also eager to ascend but had run into a firm veto from the King, who from the earliest reports had been observing the progress of the flights with keen attentiveness. Anxious about the perils of a maiden flight, the King had then proposed that two criminals be sent up in a basket, at which Charles and his colleagues became indignant.

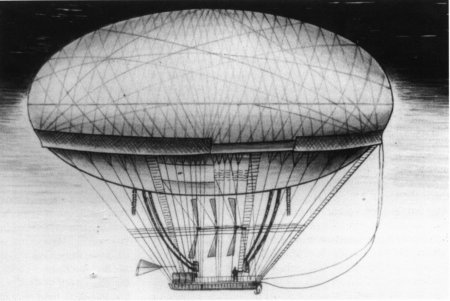
Meusnier's dirigible

=== Further ballooning activities ===
The next project of Charles and the Robert brothers was to build an elongated, steerable craft that followed Jean Baptiste Meusnier's proposals (1783–85) for a dirigible balloon. The design incorporated Meusnier's internal ballonnet (air cells), a rudder and a method of propulsion.

Charles chose never to fly in this craft, but on 15 July 1784, the brothers flew for 45 minutes from Saint-Cloud to Meudon with M. Collin-Hullin and Louis Philippe II, the Duke of Chartres in La Caroline. It was fitted with oars for propulsion and direction, but they proved useless. The absence of a 'gas release valve' meant that the duke had to slash the 'ballonnet' to prevent rupture when they reached an altitude of circa 4,500 metres (14,800 ft).

On 19 September 1784, the Robert brothers and M. Collin-Hullin flew for 6 hours 40 minutes, covering 186 km from Paris to Beuvry near Béthune. This was the first flight over 100 km.

== Inventions ==
Charles developed several useful inventions, including a valve to let hydrogen out of the balloon and other devices, such as the hydrometer and reflecting goniometer, and improved the Gravesand heliostat and Fahrenheit's aerometer. In addition he confirmed Benjamin Franklin's electrical experiments.

== Charles's law ==
Charles's law (also known as the law of volumes), describing how gases tend to expand when heated, was first published by natural philosopher Joseph Louis Gay-Lussac in 1802, but he credited it to unpublished work by Charles, and named the law in his honour.

Around 1787 Charles did an experiment where he filled five balloons to the same volume with different gases. He then raised the temperature of the balloons to 80 °C (not at constant temperature) and noticed that they all increased in volume by the same amount. This experiment was referenced by Gay-Lussac in 1802 when he published a paper on the precise relationship between the volume and temperature of a gas. Charles's law states that under constant pressure, an ideal gas' volume is proportional to its absolute temperature. The volume of a gas at constant pressure increases linearly with the absolute temperature of the gas. The formula he created was V_{1}/T_{1} = V_{2}/T_{2}.

== Career ==
Charles was elected to the American Philosophical Society in 1786 and to the Académie des Sciences, in 1795. He subsequently became a professor of physics at the Conservatoire des Arts et Métiers.

== Commemoration ==
A stele at Nesles-la-Vallée marks the Charles-Robert flight of the 1st of December, 1783. 49.1385°N 2.171°E

The Coupe Charles et Robert was an international ballooning event that was run in 1983 in parallel with the Gordon Bennett Cup.

== See also ==
- Gas laws
- Timeline of hydrogen technologies
- Jean-François Pilâtre de Rozier, the first crewed balloon flight using a Montgolfier hot-air balloon.
- Jean-Pierre Blanchard
- Timeline of aviation - 18th century
- History of ballooning
- List of firsts in aviation
