= Meusnier's theorem =

When curves on a surface passing through a given point have the same normal curvature

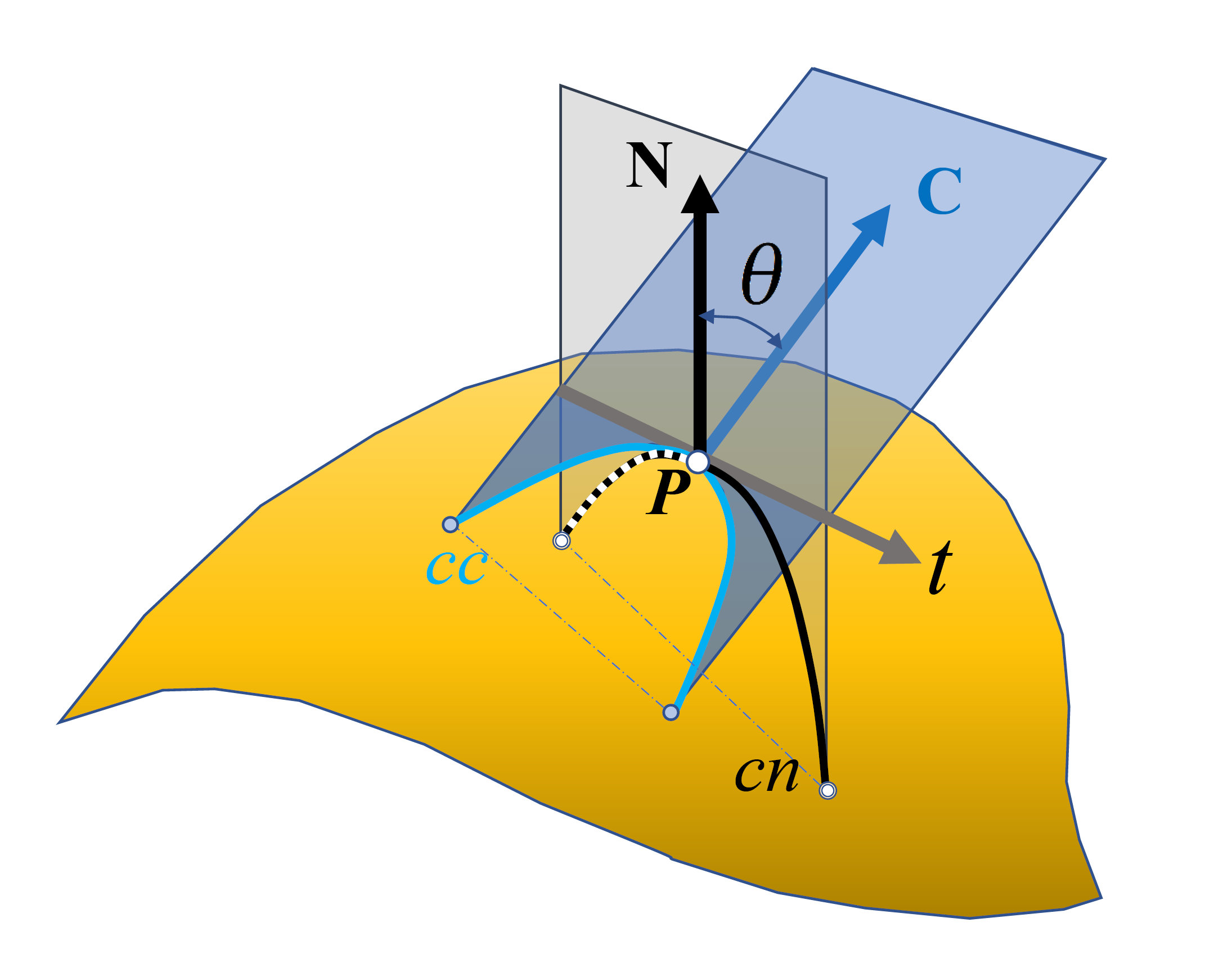
Meusnier’s theorem, visualized

In differential geometry, Meusnier's theorem states that all curves on a surface passing through a given point p and having the same tangent line at p also have the same normal curvature at p and their osculating circles form a sphere. The theorem was first announced by Jean Baptiste Meusnier in 1776, but not published until 1785. At least prior to 1912, several writers in English were in the habit of calling the result Meunier's theorem, although there is no evidence that Meusnier himself ever spelt his name in this way. This alternative spelling of Meusnier's name also appears on the Arc de Triomphe in Paris.

== Further references ==
- Meusnier's theorem Johannes Kepler University Linz, Institute for Applied Geometry
- Meusnier's theorem in Springer Online
- Porteous, Ian R. (2001). "Theorems of Euler and Meusnier". Geometric Differentiation. Cambridge University Press. pp. 253–5. ISBN 0-521-00264-8.
