= Gas balloon =

Balloon containing gases which are lighter than air

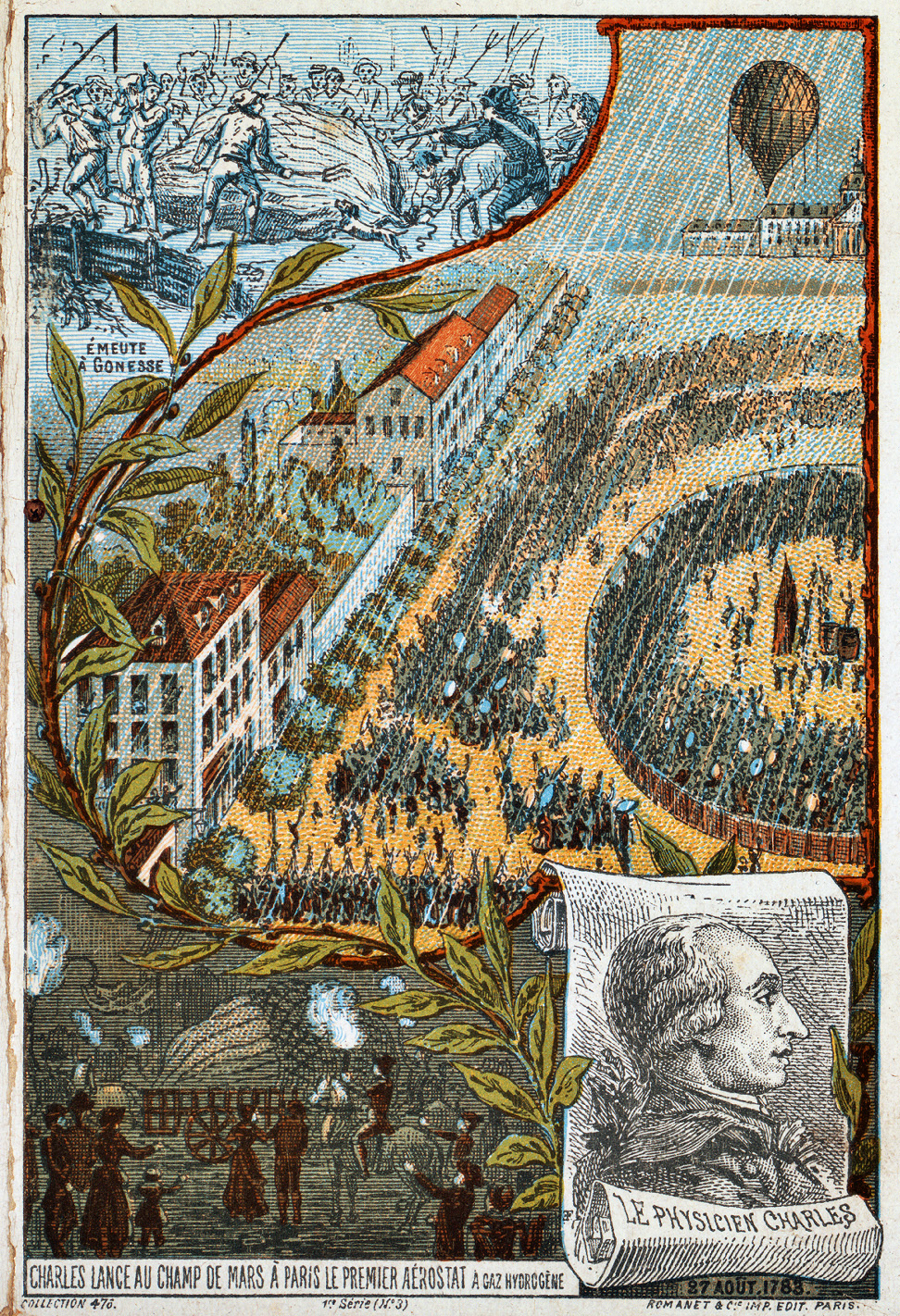
The first launch of a gas balloon by Jacques Charles and Les Frères Robert, 27 August 1783, at the Champ de Mars, Paris. Illustration from the late 19th century.

A gas balloon is a balloon that rises and floats in the air because it is filled with a gas lighter than air (such as helium or hydrogen). When not in flight, it is tethered to prevent it from flying away and is sealed at the bottom to prevent the escape of gas. A gas balloon may also be called a Charlière for its inventor, the Frenchman Jacques Charles. Today, familiar gas balloons include large blimps and small latex party balloons. For nearly 200 years, well into the 20th century, manned balloon flight utilized gas balloons before hot-air balloons became dominant. Without power, heat or fuel, untethered flights of gas balloons depended on the skill of the pilot. Gas balloons have greater lift for a given volume, so they do not need to be so large, and they can stay up for much longer than hot air balloons.

== History ==
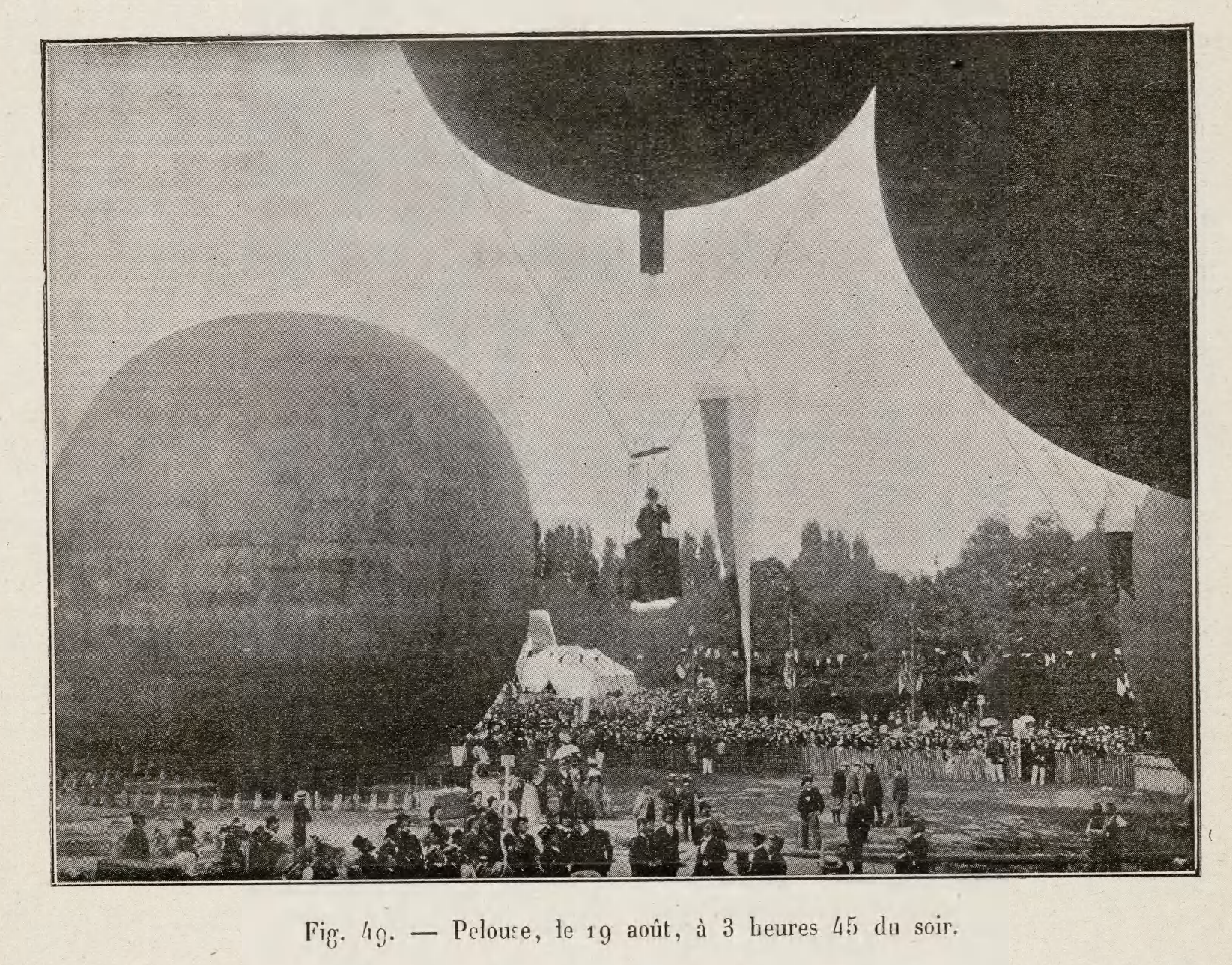
1900 Olympics ballooning event at Le Parc d'aerostation, Paris

The first gas balloon made its flight in August 1783. Designed by professor Jacques Charles and Les Frères Robert, it carried no passengers or cargo. On 1 December 1783, their second hydrogen-filled balloon made a manned flight piloted by Jacques Charles and Nicolas-Louis Robert. This occurred ten days after the first manned flight in a Montgolfier hot air balloon.

The next project of Jacques Charles and the Robert brothers was La Caroline, an elongated steerable craft that followed Jean Baptiste Meusnier's proposals for a dirigible balloon, incorporating internal ballonnets (air cells), a rudder and a method of propulsion. On September 19, 1784 the brothers and M. Collin-Hullin flew for 6 hours 40 minutes, covering 186 km from Paris to Beuvry near Béthune. This was the first flight over 100 km.

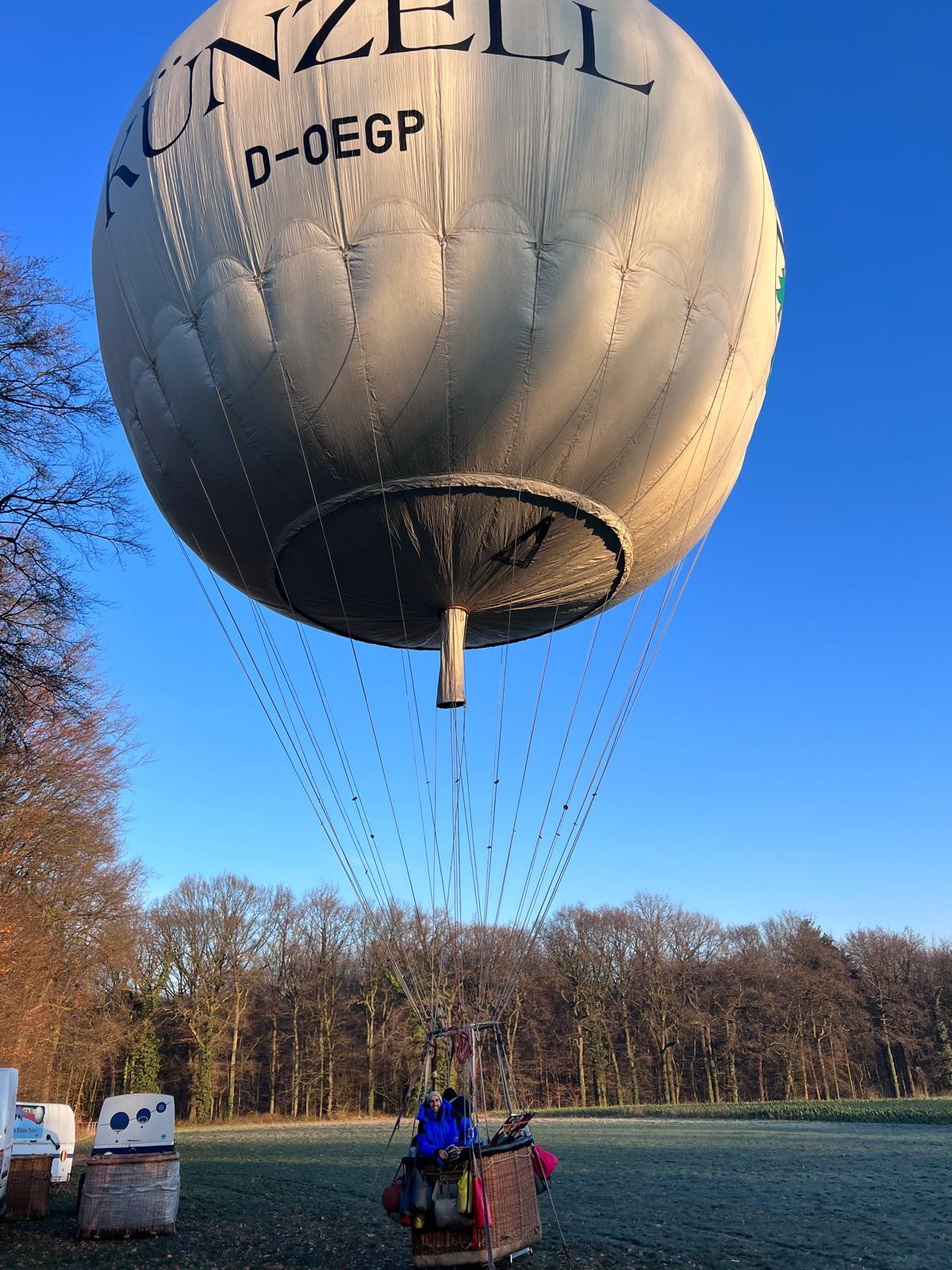
Modern hydrogen gas balloon

Gas balloons remained popular throughout the age before powered flight. Filled with hydrogen or coal gas, they were able to fly higher, further and more economically than hot-air balloons. The altitude was controlled with ballast weights that were dropped if the balloon got too low; in order to land some lifting gas was vented through a valve. Tethered manned gas balloons were used for observation purposes in the Napoleonic Wars (to very limited extent), in the American Civil War (flown by Thaddeus Lowe) and in World War I by aviators wearing parachutes. Throughout the 19th century, they were popular as objects of public fascination among hobbyists and show performers, such as the Blanchards.

Throughout the mid 20th century, spherical free gas balloons were used by the United States Navy to train airship crews.

Gas ballooning has been popular in Europe, most notably in Germany, using hydrogen as a lifting gas. Gas balloon clubs exist throughout the country. In contrast, gas ballooning in the USA is not as active with only a handful of pilots who typically fly, perhaps only once a year at the Albuquerque International Balloon Fiesta in October.

Aerophile is the world's largest lighter-than-air carrier, flying 300,000 passengers every year through its eight tethered gas balloon operations in Walt Disney World, San Diego Zoo Safari Park, Smoky Mountains & Irvine in the US and Paris, Disneyland Paris and Parc du Petit Prince in France.

== Records ==
On October 24, 2014, Alan Eustace, a former Google executive, made a jump from the stratosphere, breaking Felix Baumgartner's 2012 world record. The launch-point for his jump was from an abandoned runway in Roswell, New Mexico, where he began his balloon-powered ascent early that morning. He reached a reported maximum altitude of 135,908 feet (41.425 km; 25.7402 mi), but the final number submitted to the World Air Sports Federation was 135,889.108 feet (41.419000 km; 25.7365735 mi). The balloon used for the feat was manufactured by the Balloon Facility of the Tata Institute of Fundamental Research, Hyderabad, India. Eustace in his pressure suit hung tethered under the balloon, without the kind of capsule used by Felix Baumgartner. Eustace started his fall by using an explosive device to separate from the helium balloon.

The previous altitude record for a manned balloon flight was set at 39.045 kilometers on October 14, 2012 by Felix Baumgartner breaking a record of 34.7 kilometers on May 4, 1961 by Malcolm Ross and Victor Prather in a balloon launched from the deck of the USS Antietam in the Gulf of Mexico.

The altitude record for an unmanned balloon is 53.7 kilometers. It was reached by a stratospheric balloon manufactured by JAXA with a volume of 80,000 m³, launched in September 2013 from in Hokkaido, Japan. This is the greatest height ever obtained by an atmospheric vehicle. Only rockets, rocket planes, and ballistic projectiles have flown higher.

In 2015, pilots Leonid Tiukhtyaev and Troy Bradley arrived safely in Baja California, Mexico, after a journey of 10,711 km. The two men, originally from Russia and the United States of America respectively, started in Japan and flew with a helium balloon over the Pacific. In 160 hours and 34 minutes, the balloon, named "Two Eagles", arrived in Mexico, setting the longest distance and duration records for gas balloons.

== On other planets ==
The Soviet Union space probes Vega 1 and Vega 2 each dropped a helium balloon with scientific experiments into the atmosphere of Venus in 1985. The balloons first entered the atmosphere and descended to about 50 km, then inflated for level flight. Otherwise the flight was uncontrolled. Each balloon relayed wind and atmospheric conditions for 46 hours of a possible 60-hour electric battery power budget.

== See also ==
- Toy balloon
- Weather balloon
- Gordon Bennett Cup – famous long-distance gas balloon race
- Tethered helium balloon
- Double Eagle II – first manned balloon to cross the Atlantic Ocean
- Lawnchair Larry flight – used a lawn chair and 45 helium-filled weather balloons to rise to 16,000 feet (4,900 m)
- Sky anchor
- Five Weeks in a Balloon by Jules Verne
