= Beuvry Communal Cemetery Extension =

WWI CWGC cemetery in Pas-de-Calais, France

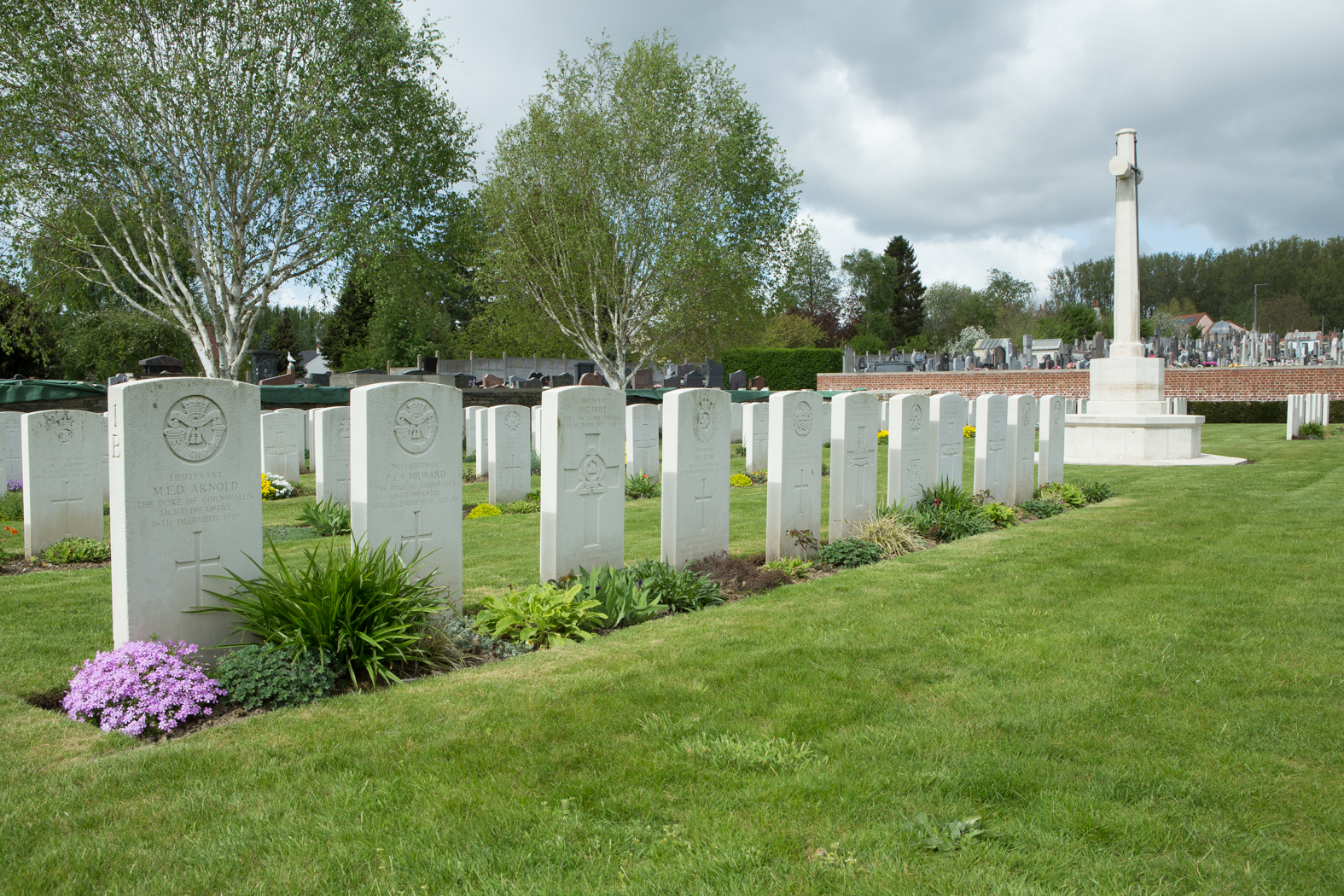

Details
- Established: March 1916
- Location: Beuvry, Pas-de-Calais, France
- Country: British and Commonwealth
- Coordinates: 50.52312°N 2.67806°E
- Type: Military
- Owned by: Commonwealth War Graves Commission
- No. of graves: 225 total, 193 identified
- Website: cwgc.org

The Beuvry Communal Cemetery Extension (also known as the Beuvry Communal Commonwealth War Graves Commission Cemetery Extension) is a cemetery located in the Pas-de-Calais region of France. It contains mostly British and Commonwealth soldiers killed near the village of Beuvry in the First and Second World Wars. The cemetery is managed by the Commonwealth War Graves Commission.

== Location ==
The extension is located to the left of the Beuvry Communal Cemetery in Beuvry, approximately 3 kilometers east of the town of Bethune, France.

== Fighting around Beuvry ==
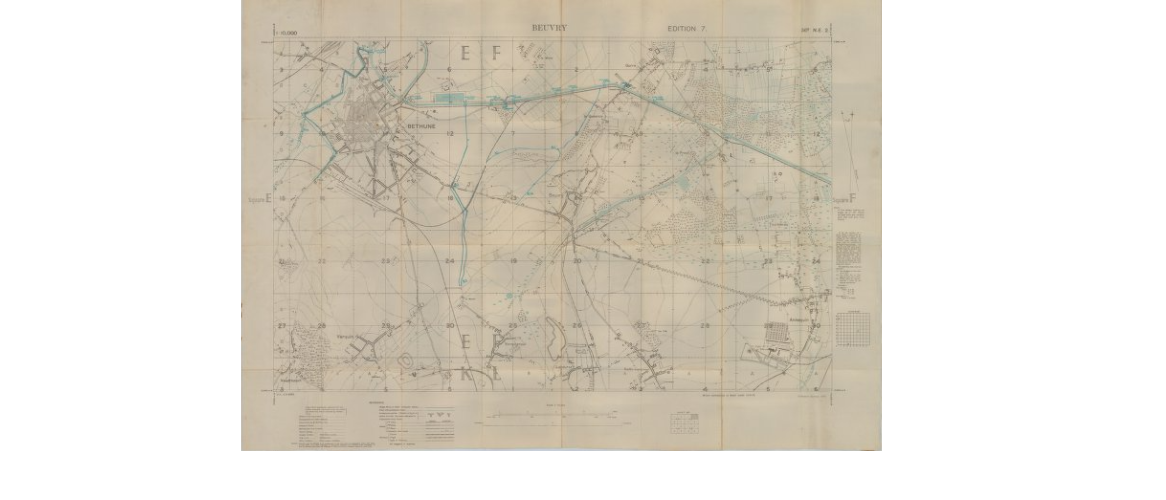
Map of trenches around Beuvry, circa 1916

Beuvry village was occupied during the First World War by a variety of British Royal Engineers, supply, and artillery units, remaining in British control even in the German spring offensive of 1918.

== Establishment of the Extension ==
=== History ===
The cemetery extension was begun in March 1916 and was used until October 1918. After the end of World War I, cemeteries from battlefields North and East of Bethune were reburied in the extension. A Cross of Sacrifice was put in the middle of the cemetery. The extension was designed by Captain Wilfred Clement Von Berg.

=== Statistics ===
The extension covers an area of 86 square meters and is surrounded by a rubble wall. There are a total of 206 World War I Commonwealth burials, of which 32 are unidentified, onsite. There is also 1 French burial from WWI located in the extension. 18 Commonwealth soldiers from World War II are buried in the extension.

Identified Burials by Nationality
War	Nationality	Number of Burials
World War I	United Kingdom	172
World War I	South Africa	2
World War I	France	1
World War II	United Kingdom	18
