= Beuvry =

- Commune
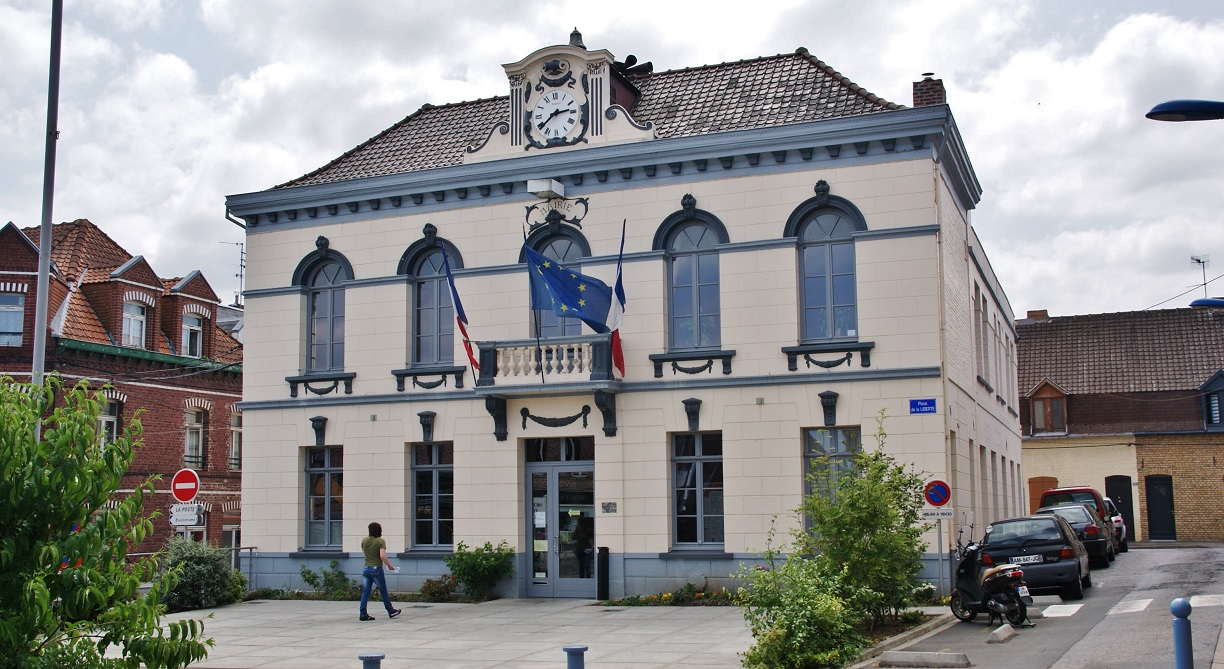
- The town hall of Beuvry

- Coat of arms
- Location of Beuvry
- Location within France Location within Hauts-de-France
- Coordinates: 50°31′14″N 2°40′49″E
- Country: France
- Region: Hauts-de-France
- Department: Pas-de-Calais
- Arrondissement: Béthune
- Canton: Beuvry
- Intercommunality: CA Béthune-Bruay, Artois-Lys Romane

Government
  - Mayor (2020–2026): Nadine Lefebvre
- Area^{1}: 16.85 km^{2} (6.51 sq mi)
- Elevation: 32 m (105 ft)
- Population (2023): 9,189
  - Density: 545.3/km^{2} (1,412/sq mi)
- Time zone: UTC+01:00 (CET)
  - Summer (DST): UTC+02:00 (CEST)
- INSEE/Postal code: 62126 /62660
- ^{1} French Land Register data, which excludes lakes, ponds, glaciers > 1 km^{2} (0.386 sq mi or 247 acres) and river estuaries.

Beuvry (French pronunciation: [bøvʁi]) is a commune in the Pas-de-Calais department in the Hauts-de-France region in northern France.

== Geography ==
A suburban town immediately southwest of Béthune, 23 miles (37 km) southwest of Lille, at the junction of the D945, D72 and N41 roads. Light industry and a little farming have replaced the coal mining of the past.

== History ==
The town's name comes from beaver (in Old French, bièvre) and underwent variations on this over the centuries: Berri; Beuvri; Bevery; Bouvry and finally Beuvry.

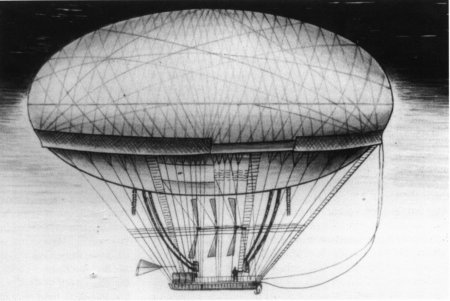
Meusnier's dirigible built and flown by the Robert brothers from Paris to Beuvry in 1784

On 19 September 1784 the Robert brothers (Anne-Jean Robert and Marie-Noël Robert) plus M. Collin-Hullin flew their hydrogen balloon, La Caroline, on request of Philippe III Alexandre, 1st Prince de Ghistelles for 6 hours 40 minutes, covering 186 km from Paris to Beuvry. La Caroline owed its design to the work of professor Jacques Charles and Jean Baptiste Meusnier and achieved the world's first ever flight over 100 km. In the Ville de Beuvry a stone monument was erected to commemorate the 200th anniversary landing of the brothers in La Caroline on 19 September 1784. A celebration ball la ducasse "du Ballon" is now held at the end of September each year.

The town has been awarded the Croix de Guerre twice: after World War I and again, after World War II.

A coal-mining town for about 100 years, the last pit closed in the 1960s.
The town was merged with the nearby city of Béthune at the end of 1993. However, many of the Beuvrygeois voiced their dissatisfaction with the decision at the time, which resulted in the municipal elections of 1995, petitions in 1995 and 1996 and the creation, in October 1996, of a special commission to give an opinion on draft amendments to the territorial limits of the city of Béthune for the re-creation of a separate town of Beuvry. The municipal election in September 1997 led to a de-merger and Beuvry became an independent full-fledged town again in November 1997.

== Population ==
Historical population
Year	Pop.	±% p.a.
1968	7,907	—
1975	8,147	+0.43%
1982	8,840	+1.17%
1990	8,744	−0.14%
1999	9,175	+0.54%
2007	9,031	−0.20%
2012	9,097	+0.15%
2017	9,442	+0.75%
2023	9,189	−0.45%
Source: INSEE

== Sights ==
- The church of St. Martin, dating from the sixteenth century.
- An old windmill
- The Prévôté building (once belonging to an abbey)..
- The sixteenth-century Manor of l'Estracelles.
- An eighteenth-century chateau.
- The Commonwealth War Graves Commission cemetery (Beuvry Communal Cemetery Extension).

== International relations ==
Beuvry is twinned with:

- Hemer, Germany.

== See also ==
- Communes of the Pas-de-Calais department
