= Jean Baptiste Meusnier =

French mathematician, engineer and Revolutionary general (1754–1793)

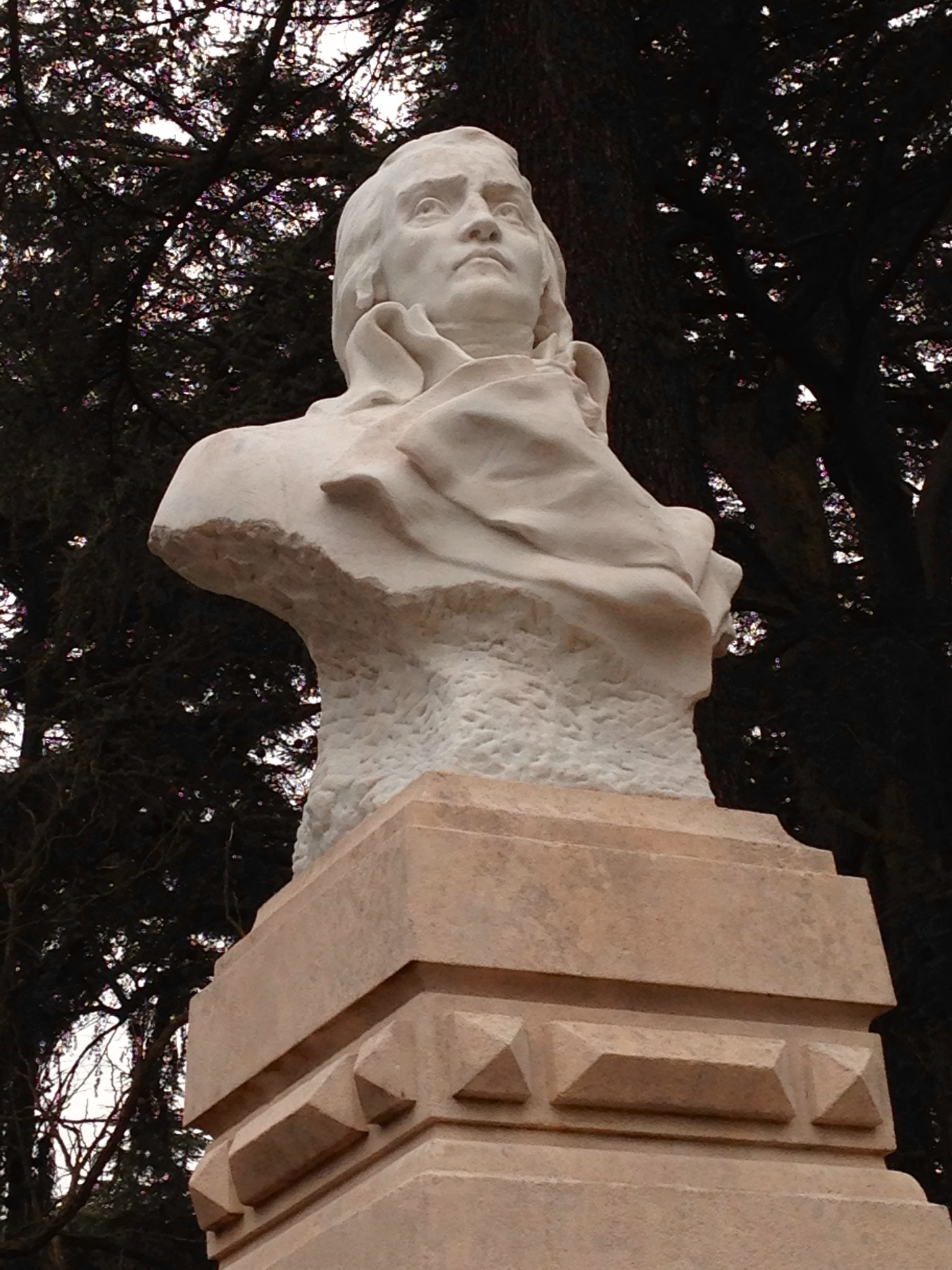
Jean Baptiste Meusnier

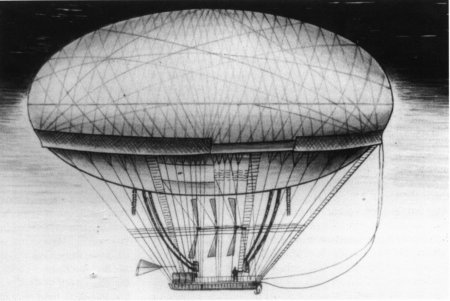
Meusnier's dirigible

Jean Baptiste Marie Charles Meusnier de la Place (Tours, 19 June 1754 — le Pont de Cassel, near Mainz, 13 June 1793) was a French mathematician, engineer and Revolutionary general. He is best known for Meusnier's theorem on the curvature of surfaces, which he formulated while he was at the École Royale du Génie (Royal School of Engineering). He also discovered the helicoid. He worked with Lavoisier on the decomposition of water and the evolution of hydrogen.

== Dirigible balloon ==
Meusnier is sometimes portrayed as the inventor of the dirigible, because of an uncompleted project he conceived in 1784, not long after the first balloon flights of the Montgolfiers, and presented to the French Academy of Sciences. This concerned an elliptical balloon (ballonet) 84 metres long, with a capacity of 1,700 cubic metres, powered by three propellers driven by 80 men. The basket, in the form of a boat, was suspended from the canopy on a system of three ropes.

=== Jacques Charles and Les Frères Robert ===
After their successful hydrogen balloon flights in 1783, professor Jacques Charles and the Robert brothers built an elongated, steerable craft that followed Jean Baptiste Meusnier's proposals. Their design incorporated Meusnier's internal ballonnet (air cell), a rudder, and a method of propulsion.

On 15 July 1784 the brothers flew for 45 minutes from Saint-Cloud to Meudon with M. Collin-Hullin and Louis Philippe II, the Duke of Chartres in their elongated balloon. Rather than 80 men it was fitted with oars for propulsion and direction, but these proved useless. The absence of a gas release valve also meant that the duke had to slash the envelope to prevent it rupturing when they reached an altitude of about 4,500 metres (15,000 ft).

On 19 September 1784 the brothers and M. Collin-Hullin flew for 6 hours 40 minutes, covering 186 km (116 mi) from Paris to Beuvry near Béthune, passing over Saint-Just-en-Chaussée and the region of Clermont de l’Oise. This was the first flight over 100 km.

=== Giffard's dirigible ===
In 1852, sixty six years after Charles and the Robert brothers 'oar powered' dirigible, Henri Giffard's design for the first successful powered airship was inspired by Meusnier's ideas.

== Meusnier's military career ==
During his military career he was put in charge of coastal defences in 1791. Fighting the Prussians on the Rhine, he was injured during the siege of Mainz (1793) and died of his wounds. For his military service, his is one of the names inscribed under the Arc de Triomphe (as MEUNIER). The UK Antarctic Place-Names Committee named Meusnier Point after his legacy.

== See also ==
- Ballonet
- Catenoid
- Mean curvature
- Timeline of hydrogen technologies
