= Nesles-la-Vallée =

- Commune
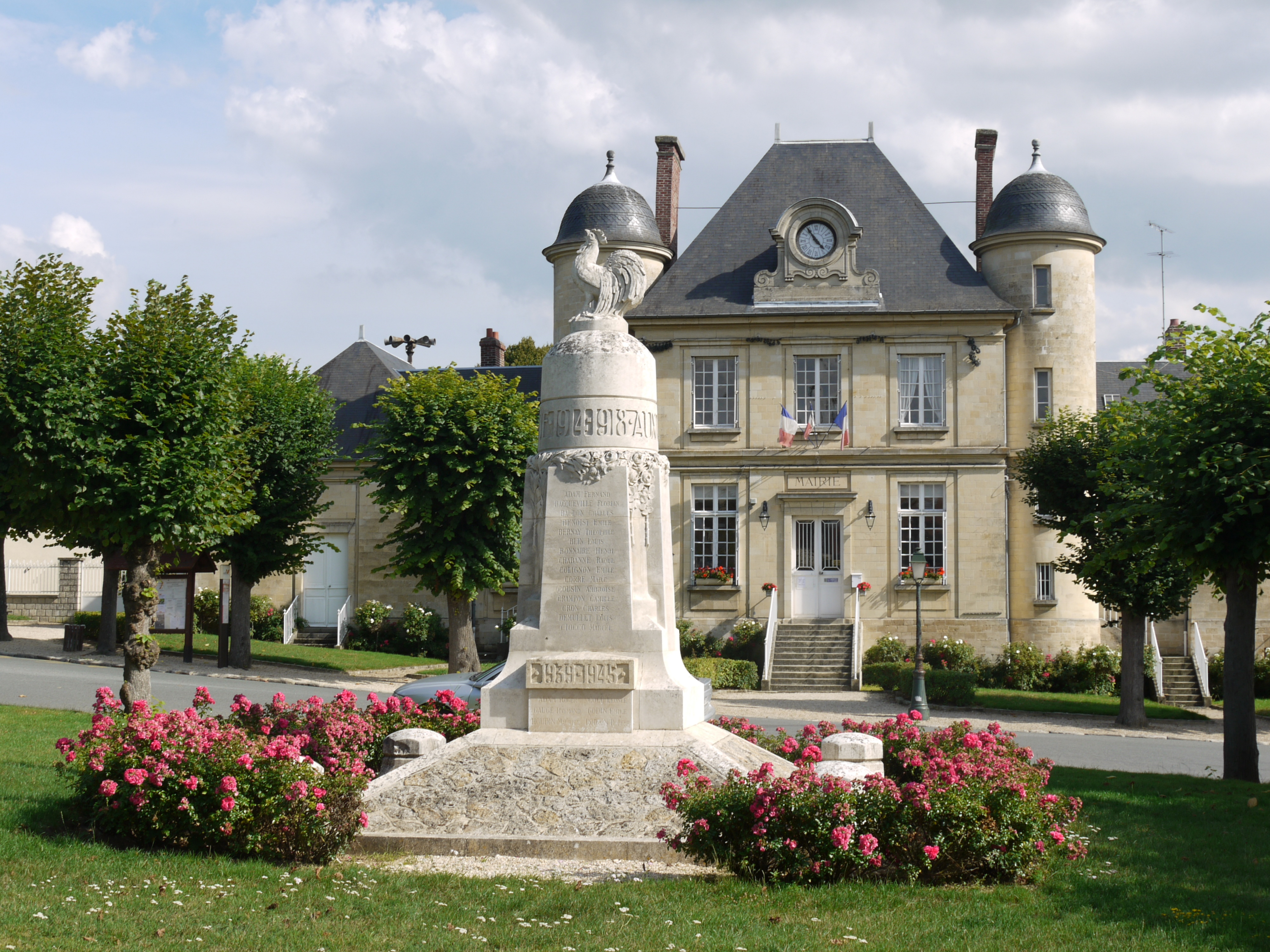
- The town hall and war memorial of Nesles-la-Vallée

- Coat of arms
- Location of Nesles-la-Vallée
- Location within France Location within Île-de-France (region)
- Coordinates: 49°07′50″N 2°10′17″E
- Country: France
- Region: Île-de-France
- Department: Val-d'Oise
- Arrondissement: Pontoise
- Canton: Saint-Ouen-l'Aumône

Government
  - Mayor (2020–2026): Christophe Buatois
- Area^{1}: 13.46 km^{2} (5.20 sq mi)
- Highest elevation: 162 m (531 ft)
- Lowest elevation: 33 m (108 ft)
- Population (2023): 1,842
  - Density: 136.8/km^{2} (354.4/sq mi)
- Time zone: UTC+01:00 (CET)
  - Summer (DST): UTC+02:00 (CEST)
- INSEE/Postal code: 95446 /95690
- ^{1} French Land Register data, which excludes lakes, ponds, glaciers > 1 km^{2} (0.386 sq mi or 247 acres) and river estuaries.

Nesles-la-Vallée (French pronunciation: [nɛl la vale]) is a commune in the Val-d'Oise department in Île-de-France in northern France.

== See also ==
- Communes of the Val-d'Oise department
