= Franz Reichelt =

French parachuting pioneer (1878–1912)

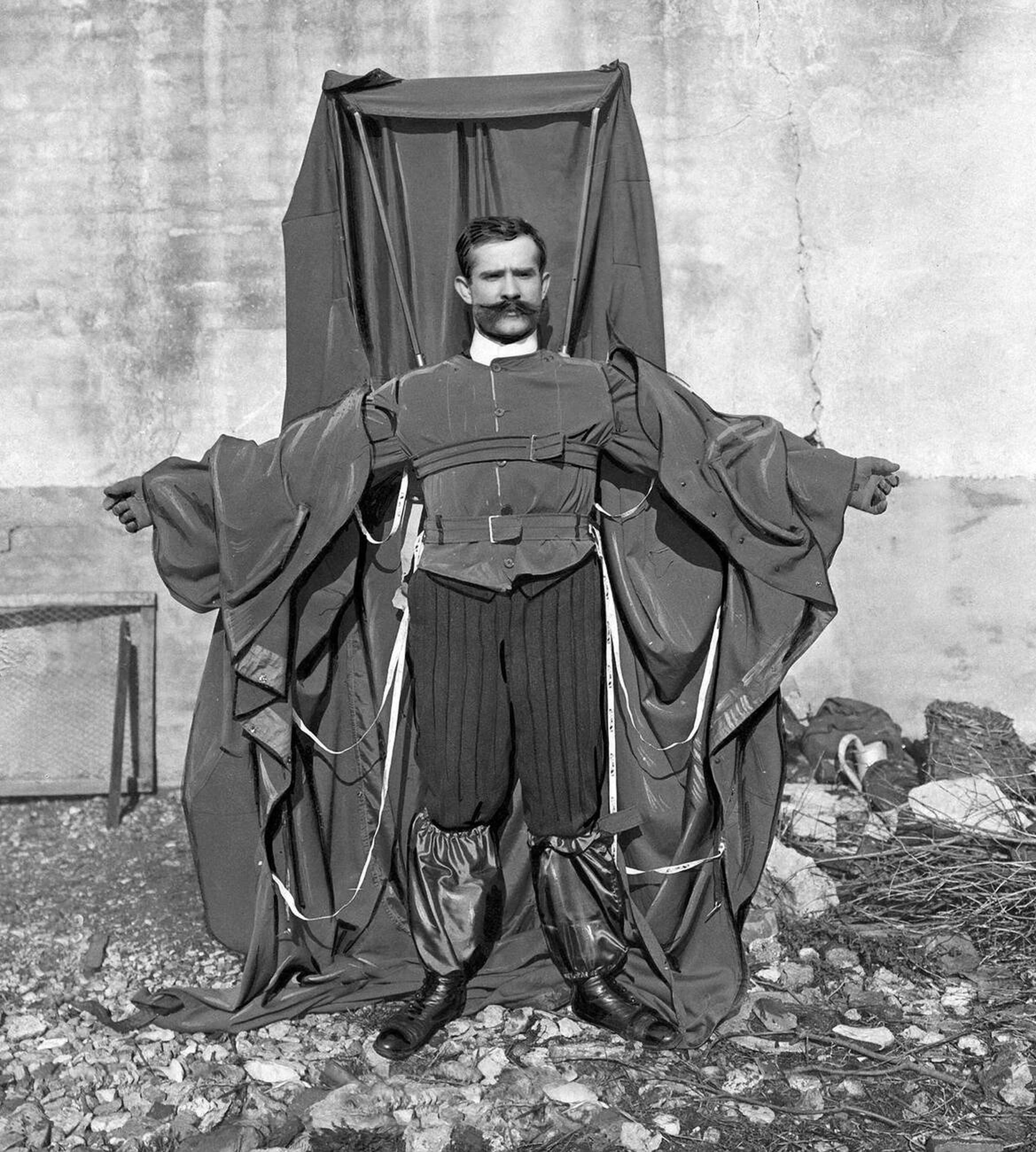
- Franz Reichelt wearing his parachute suit
- Born: 16 October 1878; Wegstädtl, Kingdom of Bohemia, Austria-Hungary
- Died: 4 February 1912 (aged 33); Paris, France
- Cause of death: Falling
- Occupations: Inventor; tailor

Franz Reichelt (16 October 1878 – 4 February 1912), also known as Frantz Reichelt or François Reichelt, was an Austro-Hungarian-born French tailor, inventor and parachuting pioneer, now sometimes referred to as the Flying Tailor. He is remembered for jumping to his death from the Eiffel Tower while testing a wearable parachute of his own design, a device that today might be called a wingsuit. Reichelt had become fixated on developing a suit for aviators that would convert into a parachute and allow them to survive a fall should they be forced to leave their aircraft in mid-air. Initial experiments conducted with dummies dropped from the fifth floor of his apartment building had been successful, but he was unable to replicate those early successes with any of his subsequent designs.

Believing that a suitably high test platform would prove his invention's efficacy, Reichelt repeatedly petitioned the Parisian Prefecture of Police for permission to conduct a test from the Eiffel Tower. He finally received permission in 1912, but when he arrived at the tower on 4 February he made it clear that he intended to jump personally rather than conduct an experiment with dummies. Despite attempts to dissuade him, he jumped from the first platform of the tower wearing his invention. The parachute failed to deploy, and he plummeted 57 metres (187 ft) to his death. The next day, newspapers were full of illustrated stories about the death of the "reckless inventor." It was captured on film and then showcased in newsreels, making it the first accidental death captured on film.

== Early life ==
Franz Reichelt was born on 16 October 1878 in Wegstädtl, Kingdom of Bohemia, Austria-Hungary (today Štětí, Czech Republic), and moved to Paris, France, in 1898. He obtained French nationality in 1909, adopting the first name François (the French equivalent of the Germanic "Franz"). One of his sisters may have also come to France and been married to a jeweller there, but newspaper reports differed on the details of his family life, with most reporting that his sisters stayed in Vienna. Reichelt himself was unmarried. He took an apartment on the third floor at 8 rue Gaillon near the Avenue de l'Opéra from 1907 and opened what was to become a successful dressmaking business, catering mostly to Austrians on trips to Paris.

== Experiments ==
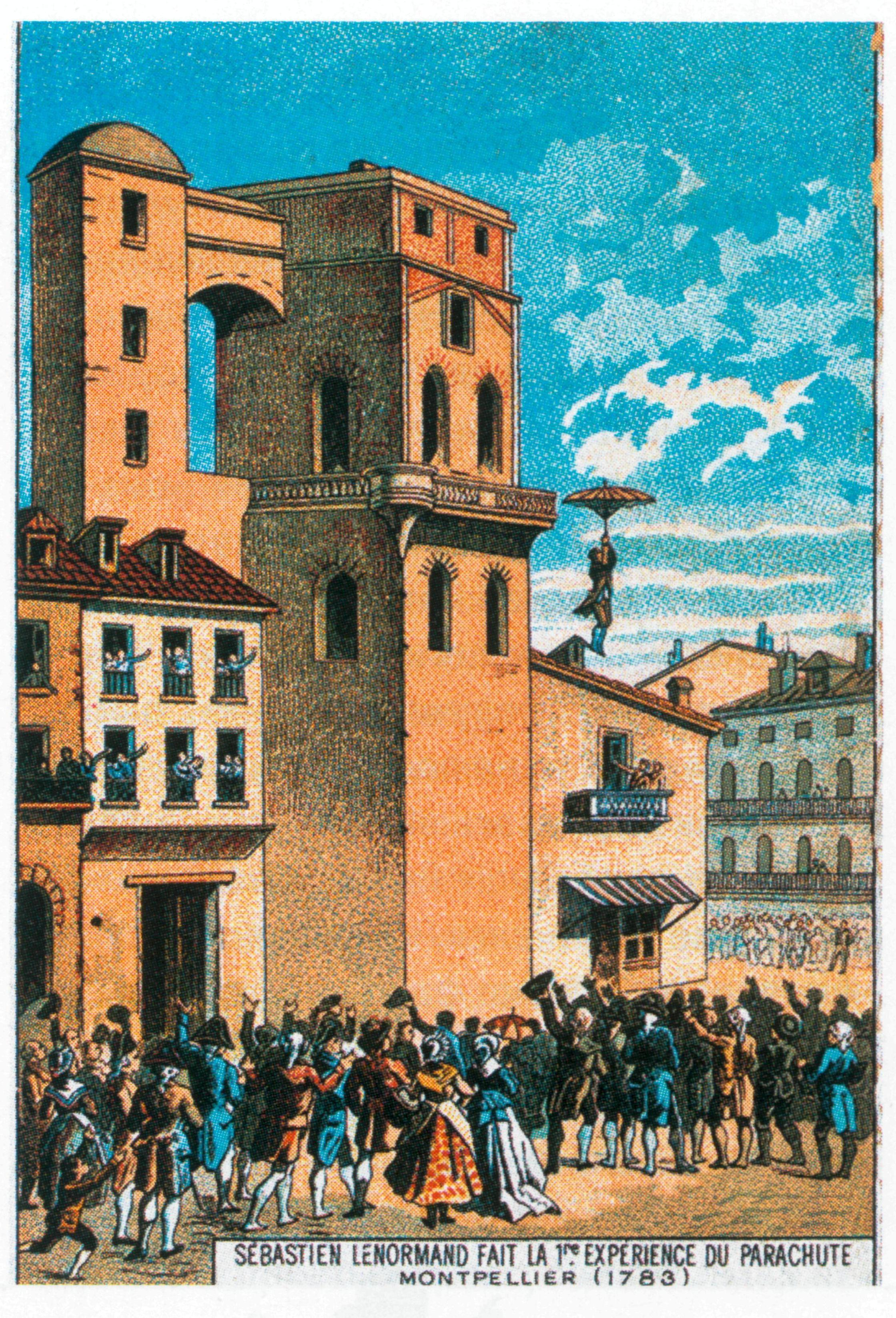
Illustration of the first parachute jump by Louis-Sébastien Lenormand from the tower of the Montpellier observatory in 1783

From July 1910, Reichelt began to develop a "parachute-suit": a suit that was not much more bulky than one normally worn by an aviator, but with the addition of a few rods, a silk canopy and a small amount of rubber that allowed it to fold out to become what Reichelt hoped would be a practical and efficient parachute.

The dawn of the aviation age brought inevitable accidents coupled with a growing interest in safety measures, most notably in the development of an effective parachute. Early parachuting successes, such as those of Louis-Sébastien Lenormand and Jean-Pierre Blanchard, had successfully used fixed-canopy parachutes (already "open" before the jump began), and André-Jacques Garnerin had invented a frameless parachute suitable for use from high altitudes, but by 1910 there was still no parachute suitable for use in jumping from a plane or at low altitude.

Reichelt seems to have become interested in parachute design after hearing some of the stories of fatal accidents among the early aeronauts and aviators. His early tests were successful: dummies equipped with foldable silk "wings" touched down lightly when dropped from five floors, but converting the prototypes into a wearable "suit" proved difficult. His original design used 6 square metres (65 ft^{2}) of material and weighed around 70 kilograms (150 lb). He presented his design to the leading aeronautic organization, La Ligue Aérienne at the Aéro-Club de France, hoping that they would test it, but they rejected his designs on the grounds that the construction of the canopy was too weak, and attempted to dissuade him from spending further time on development. Reichelt nevertheless persevered and conducted experimental drops with dummies from the courtyard of his building at rue Gaillon. None of his tests proved successful.

In 1911, a Colonel Lalance wrote to the Aéro-Club de France, offering a prize of 10,000 francs for a safety parachute for aviators – double the prize he had offered the year before. (Note: The prize was eventually presented to Frédéric Bonnet in 1913.) The competition was open for three years and stipulated that the parachute must weigh no more than 25 kilograms (55 lb). Reichelt refined his design, reducing the weight while increasing the surface area of the material until it reached 12 square metres (130 ft^{2}). But his tests were still unsuccessful and his dummies invariably fell heavily to earth.

L'Ouest-Éclair reported in 1911 that Reichelt had personally jumped from a height of 8 to 10 metres (26 to 33 ft) at Joinville; the attempt failed but a pile of straw helped him escape injury. Le Matin reported an attempt at Nogent from a height of 8 metres (26 ft) that resulted in a broken leg. Le Petit Journal suggested that Reichelt also made at least two apparently inconclusive tests with dummies from the first deck of the Eiffel Tower during 1911, but an interview with one of his friends in La Presse made it clear that he had been unsuccessfully applying for permission to conduct a test from the tower for over a year before he finally received the authorization for the final jump. There had been other tests from the tower during 1910 and 1911 though; Gaston Hervieu, who employed a dummy aircraft and mannequins in his experiments, was attempting to perfect a parachute design to ensure the safe landing of a pilot with all or part of a damaged aircraft. Reichelt attributed the previous failures of his designs at least in part to the short drop distances over which he had conducted his tests, so he was keen to receive permission to experiment from the tower.

== Eiffel Tower jump ==
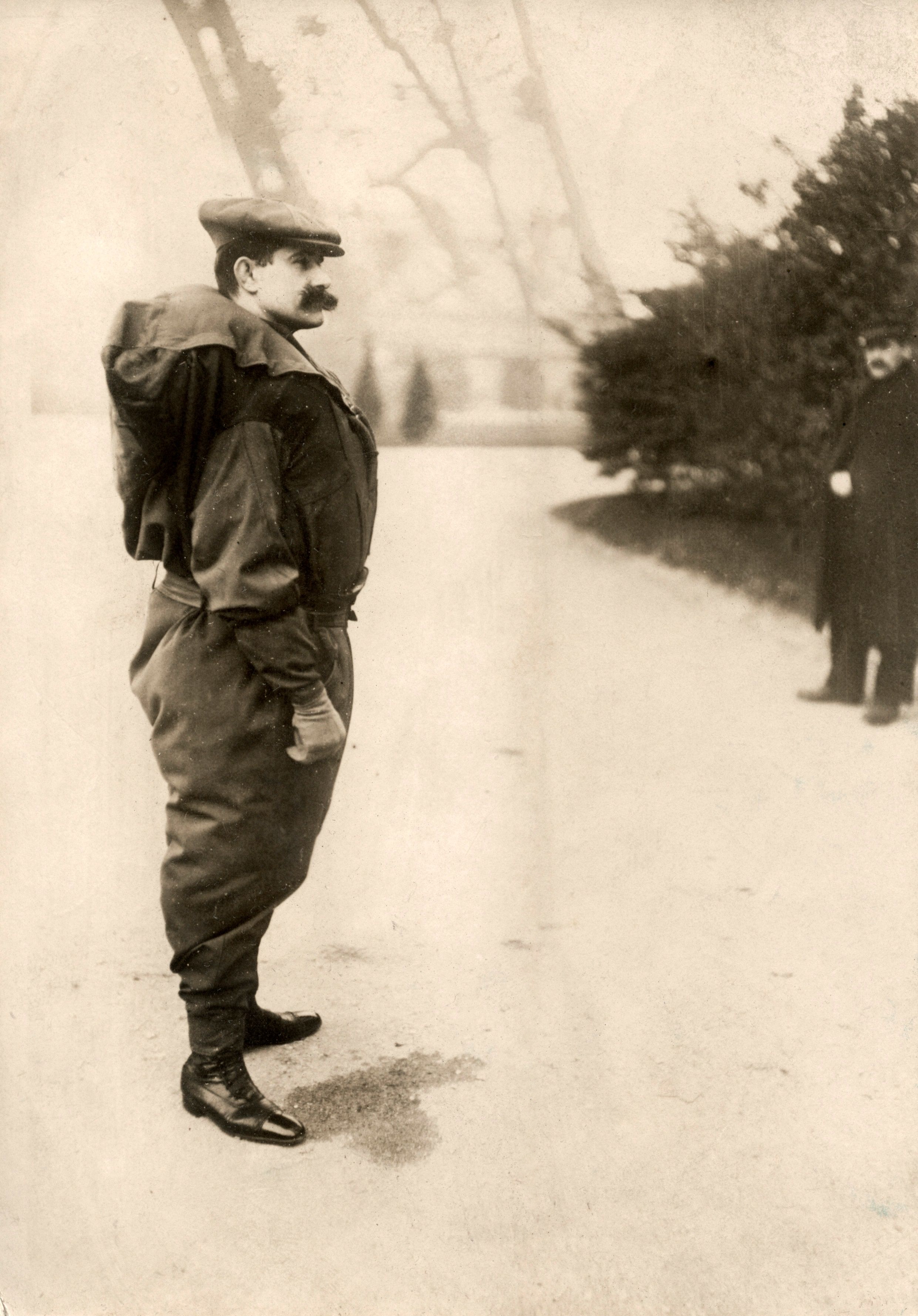
Reichelt showed off the suit at the foot of the Eiffel Tower shortly before his fatal fall.

Reichelt announced to the press in early February 1912 that he had finally received permission and would shortly conduct an experiment from the Eiffel Tower to prove the value of his invention.

On Sunday, 4 February, at 7:00 a.m., Reichelt arrived at the tower by car with two friends. He was already wearing his parachute suit. The news footage of his jump shows him modelling his invention in its folded form, which Le Gaulois described as "only a little more voluminous than ordinary clothing". The suit did not restrict the wearer's movements when the parachute was packed, and Le Petit Parisien described the method of deploying the parachute as being as simple as extending the arms out to form a cross with the body. Once extended, the outfit resembled "a sort of cloak fitted with a vast hood of silk", according to Le Temps. L'Action Française reported that Reichelt stated the surface area of the final design to be 30 square metres (320 ft^{2}) with a canopy height of 5 metres (16 ft), while Le Figaro judged the surface area might have reached 32 square metres (340 ft^{2}). La Croix claimed that the suit may have weighed as little as 9 kilograms (20 lb). The weather was cold, with temperatures below 0 °C (32 °F), (Note: L'Action Française recorded the temperature as −7 °C (19 °F) at 7 am.) and there was a stiff breeze blowing across the Champ de Mars.

Some police officers were present to maintain order, as the Parisian Prefecture of Police had given Reichelt permission to proceed. After his death, Louis Lépine who, as the Prefect of Police, was ultimately responsible for the permission being granted, issued a statement making it clear that while the police routinely gave permission for experiments to be performed from the Eiffel Tower, it was understood in these cases that dummies would be used. They had given permission in Reichelt's case only on the basis that he would be conducting dummy drops, and that under no circumstances would they have allowed him to proceed if they had known he would be making the jump himself. Lépine assured La Croix that he had never signed an order that allowed a live jump.

From his arrival at the tower, however, Reichelt made it clear that he intended to jump himself. According to a later interview with one of the friends who accompanied him up the tower, this was a surprise to everybody, as Reichelt had concealed his intention until the last moment. His friends tried to persuade him to use dummies in the experiment, assuring him that he would have other opportunities to make the jump himself. When this failed to make an impression on him, they pointed to the strength of the wind and said he should call off the test on safety grounds, or at least delay until the wind dropped. They were unable to shake his resolve; seemingly undeterred by the failure of his previous tests, he told journalists from Le Petit Journal that he was totally convinced that his apparatus would work, and work well. When questioned as to whether he planned to take any additional precautions, such as using a safety rope, he replied that he would not, since he intended to trust his life entirely to his parachute:

Je veux tenter l’expérience moi-même et sans chiqué, car je tiens à bien prouver la valeur de mon invention.

Translation:

I want to try the experiment myself and without trickery, as I intend to prove the worth of my invention.

Hervieu, who was present to witness the demonstration, also attempted to dissuade Reichelt from making the jump. He was concerned that the parachute needed longer to fully open than the few seconds the drop from the first platform would allow, and he also presented other technical objections to which Reichelt could not provide a satisfactory response. Reichelt finally replied that:

Vous allez voir comment mes soixante-douze kilos et mon parachute vont donner à vos arguments le plus décisif des démentis.

Translation:

You are going to see how my seventy-two kilos [159 lb] and my parachute will give your arguments the most decisive rebuttal.

Reichelt's jump and fall, his body being removed, and measurement of the hollow created by the impact were captured on film.

Ropes had been suspended between the legs of the tower by the police at Reichelt's request to prevent the crowds from spilling onto the landing zone, and he spent some time discussing the arrangements with the marshals and ensuring that there was sufficient space for his landing before going to the stairs to climb to the first platform.

According to Le Petit Parisien, Reichelt's initial attempt to ascend to the first stage of the tower was blocked by a guard named Gassion, who had witnessed previous unsuccessful dummy drops and feared that Reichelt's attempt would end in disaster, though Le Figaro reported that he had merely not received a copy of the order and had to wait for telephone confirmation from his superiors. Despite the guard's resistance, by 8:00 a.m. the matter had been resolved: Reichelt, who was visibly shaken by his argument with the guard, was allowed to mount the tower with his two friends and a cinematographer (another was stationed near the foot of the tower to record the jump from below). As Reichelt climbed the stairs he paused, turned back to the crowd, raised his hand and wished them a cheery, "See you soon!" His friends continued to try to talk him out of the jump, but he remained undeterred.

At 8:22 a.m., observed by a crowd of about thirty journalists and curious onlookers, Reichelt readied himself – facing towards the Seine – on a stool placed on a restaurant table next to the interior guardrail of the tower's first deck, a little more than 57 metres (187 ft) above the ground. After adjusting his apparatus with the assistance of his friends and checking the wind direction by throwing a piece of paper taken from a small book, he placed one foot on the guardrail, hesitated for about forty seconds, then leapt outwards. According to Le Figaro, he was calm and smiling just before he jumped. His parachute, which had seemed to be only half-open, folded around him almost immediately and he fell for a few seconds before striking the frozen soil at the foot of the tower.

Le Petit Parisien reported that Reichelt's right leg and arm were crushed, his skull and spine broken, and that he was bleeding from his mouth, nose and ears. Le Figaro noted that his eyes were wide open and dilated. He was already dead by the time onlookers rushed to his body, but he was taken to the Necker Hospital where he was officially pronounced dead, and then on to a police station in the rue Amélie before being returned to his home in rue Gaillon. Édouard Launet, writing in the Summer supplement of Libération in 2009, mentioned that an autopsy allegedly concluded that Reichelt had died of a heart attack during his fall.

== Aftermath ==
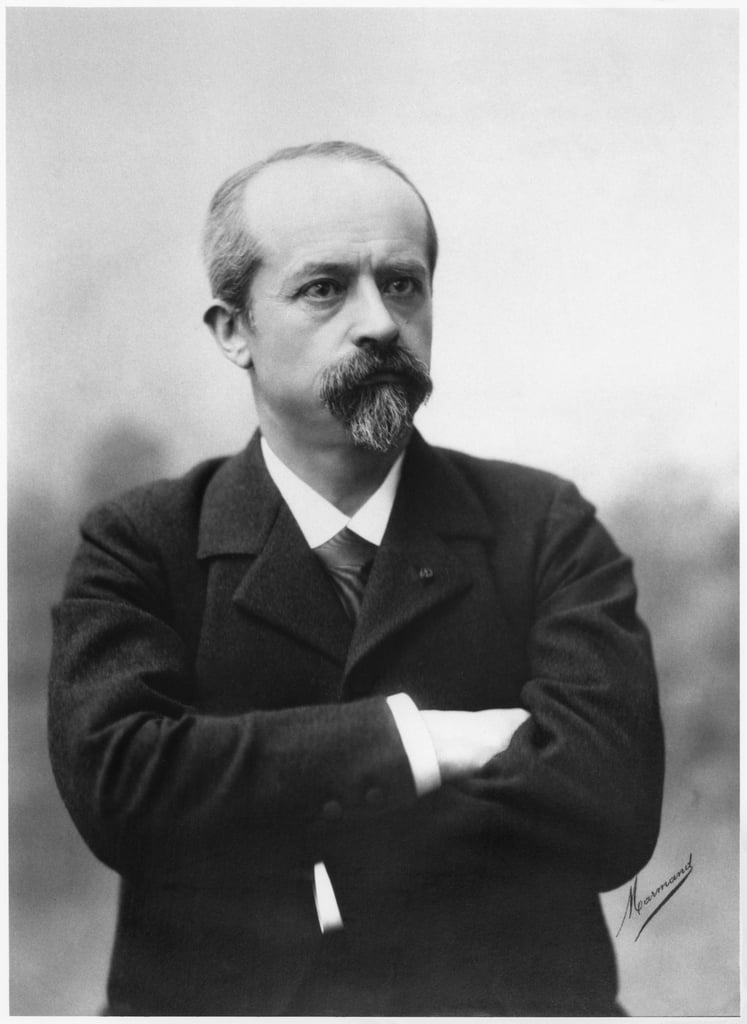
The Prefect of Police, Louis Lépine, denied that Reichelt had been authorized to make a "live" jump.

The next day's newspapers were full of the story of Reichelt's "tragic experiment", complete with photographs; at least four newspapers, Le Petit Parisien, Le Matin, La Croix and L'Humanité, (Note: The Catholic newspaper La Croix did not publish a Monday edition, but reported the story on the front page of the Tuesday edition.) showed images of the fatal jump. Film of the attempt, including footage of Reichelt's body being removed and the onlookers measuring the depth of the crater left by his impact (15 centimetres; 5.9 in), was distributed by news organizations. Reichelt’s death was also the first non-intentional death to be filmed in history.

Initial reports speculated on Reichelt's state of mind: none assumed he had been suicidal, but many called him discombobulated in the brain. A journalist in Le Gaulois suggested that only half the term "mad genius" applied to Reichelt – although the same report included an interview with one of his friends, who claimed that the tailor had felt pressured into giving a dramatic demonstration to attract sponsors, without whom he could not expect to make a profit before any patent expired. Reichelt's death was the first to result from a parachuting accident since Charles Leroux died giving a demonstration in Tallinn in 1889. In fact, on 2 February 1912 – two days prior to Reichelt's fatal jump – an American steeplejack, Frederick R. Law, had successfully parachuted from the viewing platform of the torch of the Statue of Liberty (223 feet (68 m) above sea level and 151 feet (46 m) from the base of the statue), seemingly on a whim. On 6 February, La Croix added a footnote to the report on Reichelt's death: another parachuting experiment was to take place on 18 or 25 February at Port-Aviation (often called "Juvisy Airfield") in Viry-Châtillon (often misidentified as Juvisy-sur-Orge), in which the aviator Camille Guillaume planned to leap from his Blériot monoplane at a height of 300 metres (980 ft) to test a parachute design (the plane would be allowed to crash).

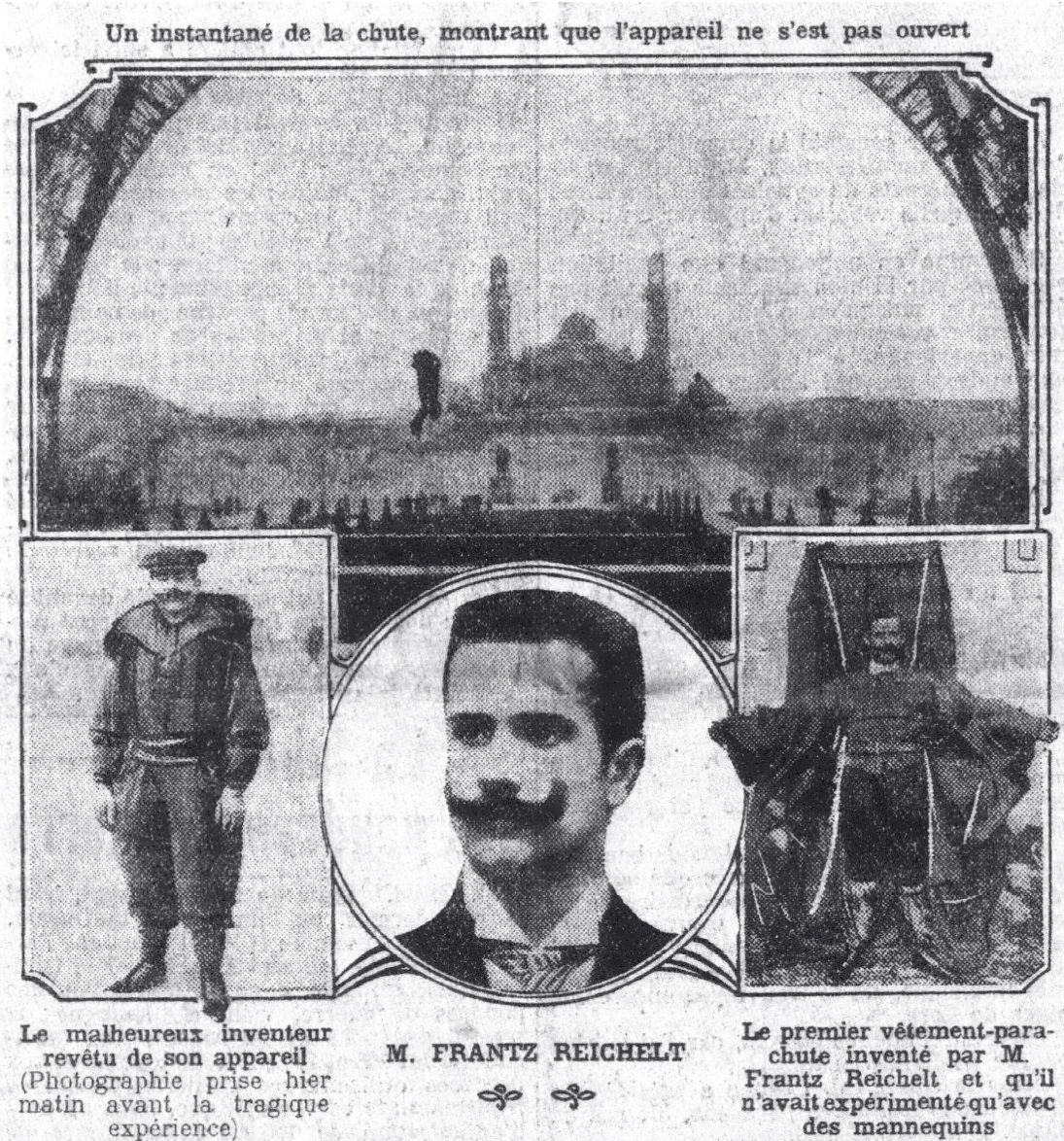
Le Petit Parisien and other newspapers carried pictures of Reichelt's fatal fall on their front pages the next day.

After Reichelt's death, authorities became wary of granting permission for any further parachute experiments using the Eiffel Tower. Though they continued to grant permissions for parachute dummy drops, some hopeful inventors – such as a man named Damblanc, who wished to try his "helicopter parachute" from the second platform – were refused permission to conduct tests, and even applications for aviation experiments not involving the tower came under renewed scrutiny. More recently, the tower has become the scene of a number of illicit base jumps. A Norwegian man died in 2005 after losing his canopy while attempting a promotional jump for a clothing firm – the first parachuting death at the tower since Reichelt. A sanctioned stunt jump for the 1985 James Bond film A View to a Kill was successful.

Reichelt came momentarily to prominence again in the 1940s in the United States, when his likeness was claimed as the model for one of the figures that were "strangely un-American in expression and garb" in the WPA-funded mural at Floyd Bennett Field in Brooklyn, New York. In an incident reminiscent of the 1933 controversy over Diego Rivera's Man at the Crossroads mural at Rockefeller Center, a furor erupted over an image depicting two minor leftist aviators, supposedly flanking a central portrait of Joseph Stalin. The WPA already had an unwanted reputation as being sympathetic to the left, and despite the artist August Henkel's "glib" explanation of the "accidental" inclusion of a Soviet red star and his claim that the image identified as Stalin was actually of Reichelt, the murals were taken down and three of the four panels burned. The story of Reichelt's misadventure was also the subject of a 1993 French short film, Le Tailleur Autrichien, written and directed by Pablo Lopez Paredes and starring Bruce Myers in the title role.

Although there were no viable parachuting solutions for use in aeroplanes when Reichelt began developing his suit, a patent for a packable parachute had been applied for by Gleb Kotelnikov. (Note: Kotelnikov was granted a patent in France in March 1912.)

== In popular culture ==
Reichelt's jump is retold in the novel Chasing the Black Eagle by Canadian author Bruce Geddes.

== See also ==
- Louis-Sébastien Lenormand
- André-Jacques Garnerin
- Gleb Kotelnikov
- Wingsuit flying
- List of inventors killed by their own inventions
- List of unusual deaths in the 20th century

== Bibliography ==
- "La mort de l'inventeur". L'Humanité (in French). 5 February 1912. p. 1.
- Gordon, Alastair (2004). Naked Airport: A Cultural History of the World's Most Revolutionary Structure. Metropolitan Books. p. 320. ISBN 0-8050-6518-0.
