= Citoyenne Henri =

French balloonist; one of the first women to ascend in a hot-air balloon

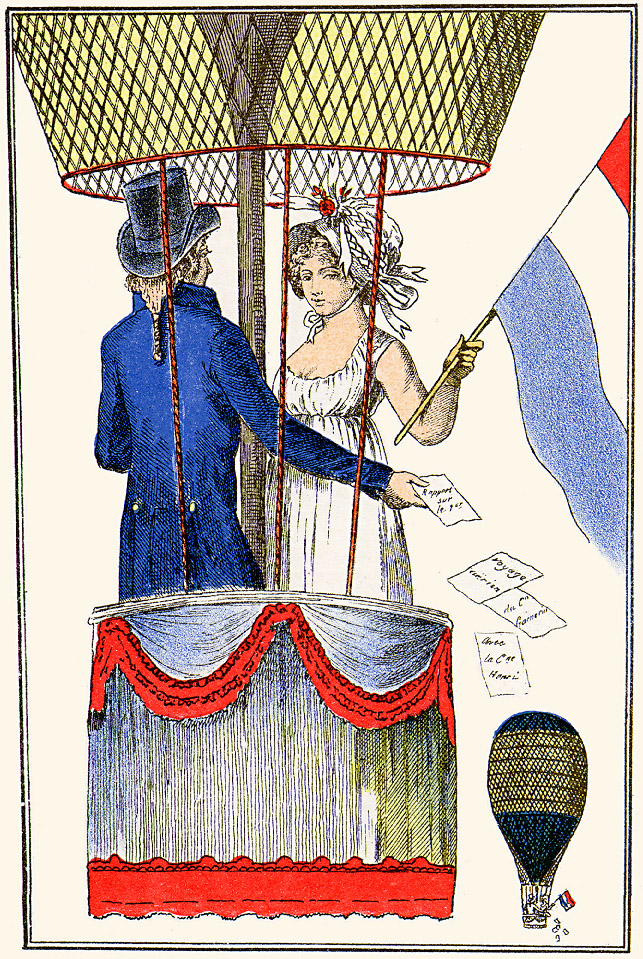
Citoyenne Henri accompanies Garnerin.

Citoyenne Henri (often called Citizen Henry in English) was a woman who accompanied André-Jacques Garnerin on a trip by balloon on 8 July 1798 from the Parc Monceau in Paris.

She was credited as the first woman "who ever had the courage to trust herself in the regions of air", although several women had already made ascents in a balloon: on 20 May 1784, the Marchioness and Countess of Montalembert, the Countess of Podenas and a Miss de Lagarde had taken a trip on a tethered balloon in Paris, and Élisabeth Thible had made an ascent in an untethered balloon on 4 June 1784.

== Announcement and legal challenge ==
The balloonist and parachuting pioneer André-Jacques Garnerin announced in 1798 that on his next ascent he would be accompanied by a young woman. Although the public and press were in favour of Garnerin's idea, he was forced to appear in front of officials of the Central Bureau of Police to attempt to justify his project. Chief among their concerns was the effect that the air pressure might have on the organs of the delicate female body, though it appears that they were also concerned about the moral implications of a man and woman being alone in a balloon together. When questioned as to the expected results of the atmospheric pressure and what would happen if the woman was to lose consciousness, Garnerin replied that he did not expect anything untoward to occur and that he would be personally responsible for dealing with any mishaps. Unsatisfied with Garnerin's responses, the police issued an injunction against him, forbidding the ascent on the grounds that the young woman was committing herself to the venture without any idea of the possible outcome.

Garnerin refused to accept the decision handed down by the Central Bureau and appealed to the administration of the department. Consultation with the Minister of the Interior and Minister of the Police followed and the injunction was eventually overturned on the grounds that "there was no more scandal in seeing two people of different sexes ascend in a balloon than it is to see them jump into a carriage." They also concluded that the decision of the woman to take the balloon trip showed proof of her confidence in the experiment and a degree of personal intrepidity.

Citoyenne Henri had already been chosen by Garnerin to accompany him, and as result of the lifting of the ban he was immediately ready to proceed with his plan. He advertised the ascent in the L'Ami des Lois:

The young citoyenne who will accompany me is delighted to see the day approach for the journey. I shall ascend with her from the Parc de Mousseaux, (Note: Parc Monceau is in the 8th arrondissement of Paris and is famed for Garnerin's public exploits. It was formerly known as 'Parc de Mousseaux' and is referred to as such in many sources. (Mousseaux-sur-Seine is a small town approximately 70 kilometres from Paris.)) some time during the next ten days.

== The balloon flight ==
On 8 July 1798 a large number of spectators gathered in the Parc Monceau to witness the ascent. By all accounts Citoyenne Henri was young and beautiful, and she and Garnerin took several turns around the park to the applause of the crowd before she was assisted into the basket of the balloon by the astronomer Jérôme Lalande. The balloon trip passed without incident and the journey ended at Goussainville about 30 kilometres (19 mi) to the north of Paris.

There is no record of the relationship between Garnerin and Citoyenne Henri, where he recruited her for the trip or what her motives were in accepting. Garnerin gave her a present after the trip.

== Aftermath ==
There was fervent press interest in the beautiful young girl for a few days, but her fame did not endure. Shortly afterwards, on 10 November 1798, Garnerin's future wife Jeanne Geneviève Labrosse was also taken up in his balloon. Subsequently, both his wife and his niece Élisa Garnerin became well known for their parachuting feats and Madame Blanchard was celebrated for her solo ballooning, relegating the less impressive exploits of Citoyenne Henri to a footnote in history.

== Bibliography ==
- Walsh, William Shepard (1913). A Handy Book of Curious Information. J.B. Lippincott Company.
