= Jeanne Geneviève Garnerin =

French balloonist and parachutist (1775–1847)

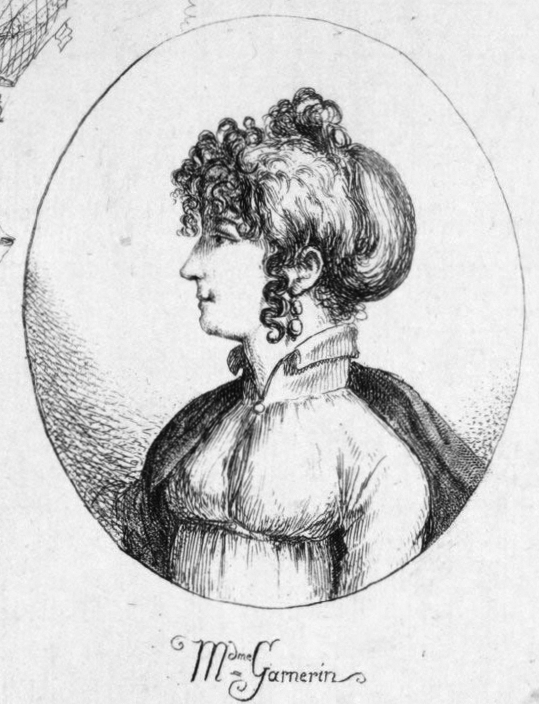
- Born: 7 March 1775; Paris (Kingdom of France)
- Died: 14 June 1847 former 10th arrondissement of Paris (July Monarchy)
- Occupation: Balloonist

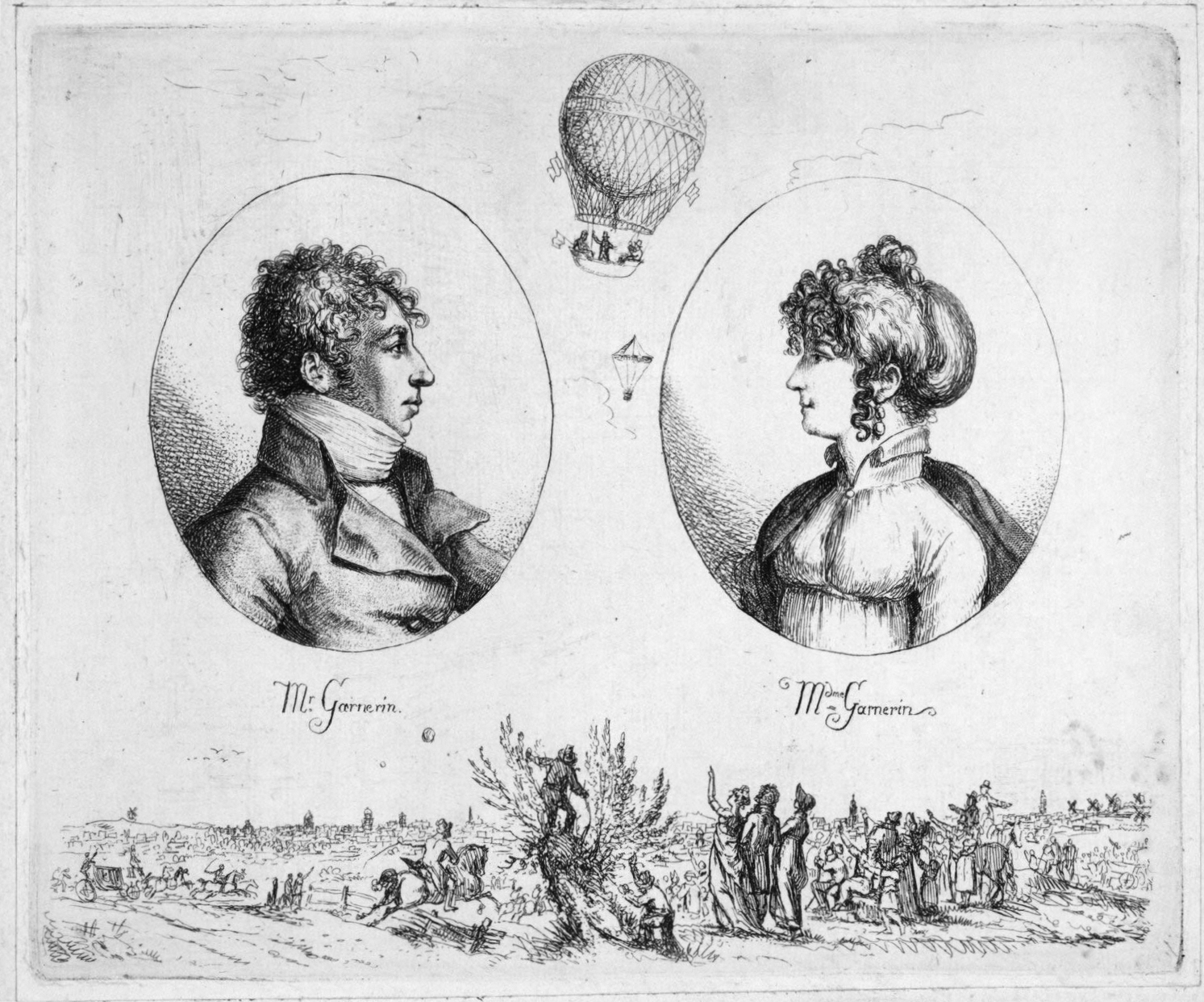
Monsieur and Madame Garnerin (Christoph Haller von Hallerstein, c. 1803)

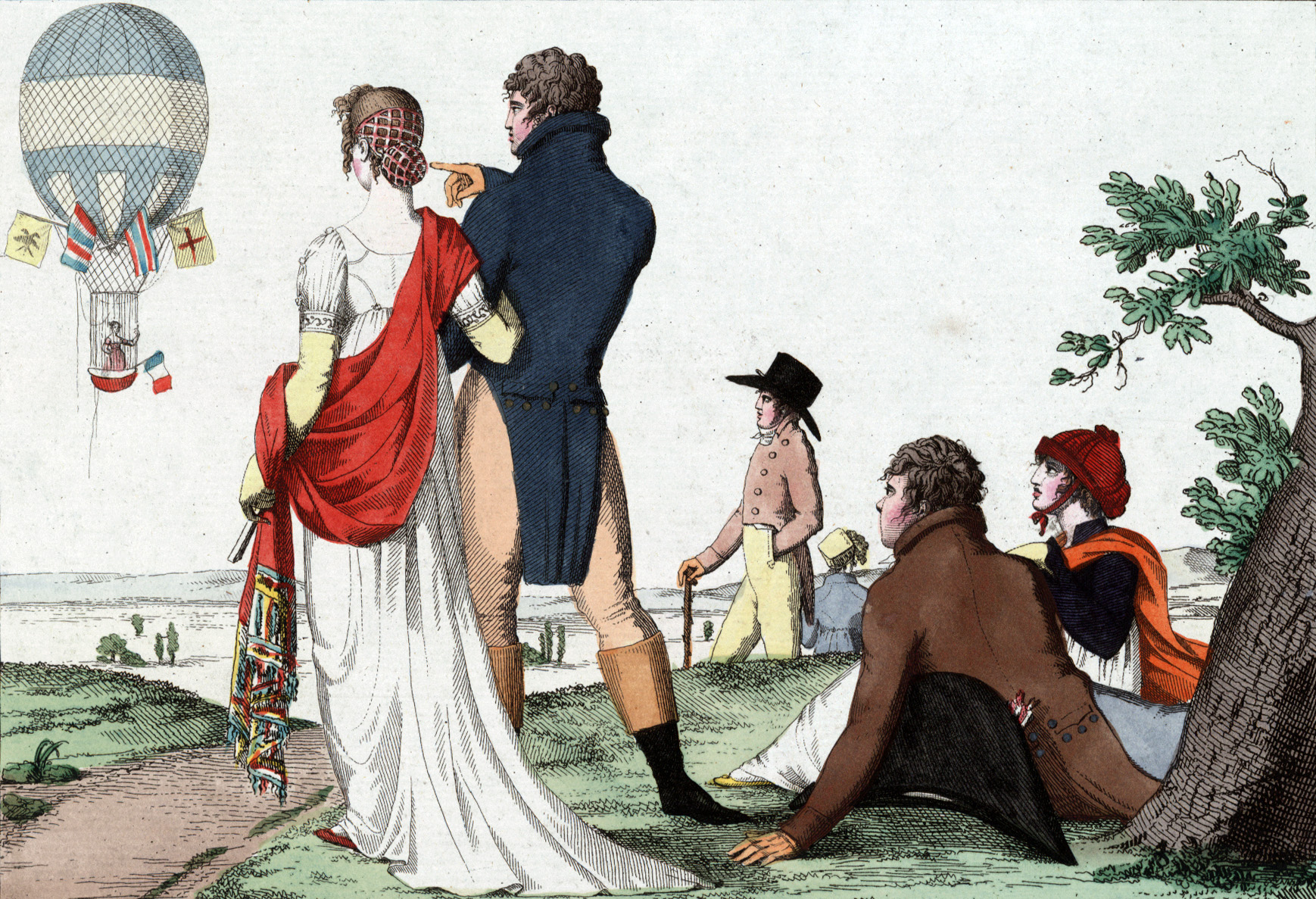
Spectators watching Garnerin ascend in a balloon on 28 March 1802. Artwork published in the 1870s in a historical Parisian fashion magazine.

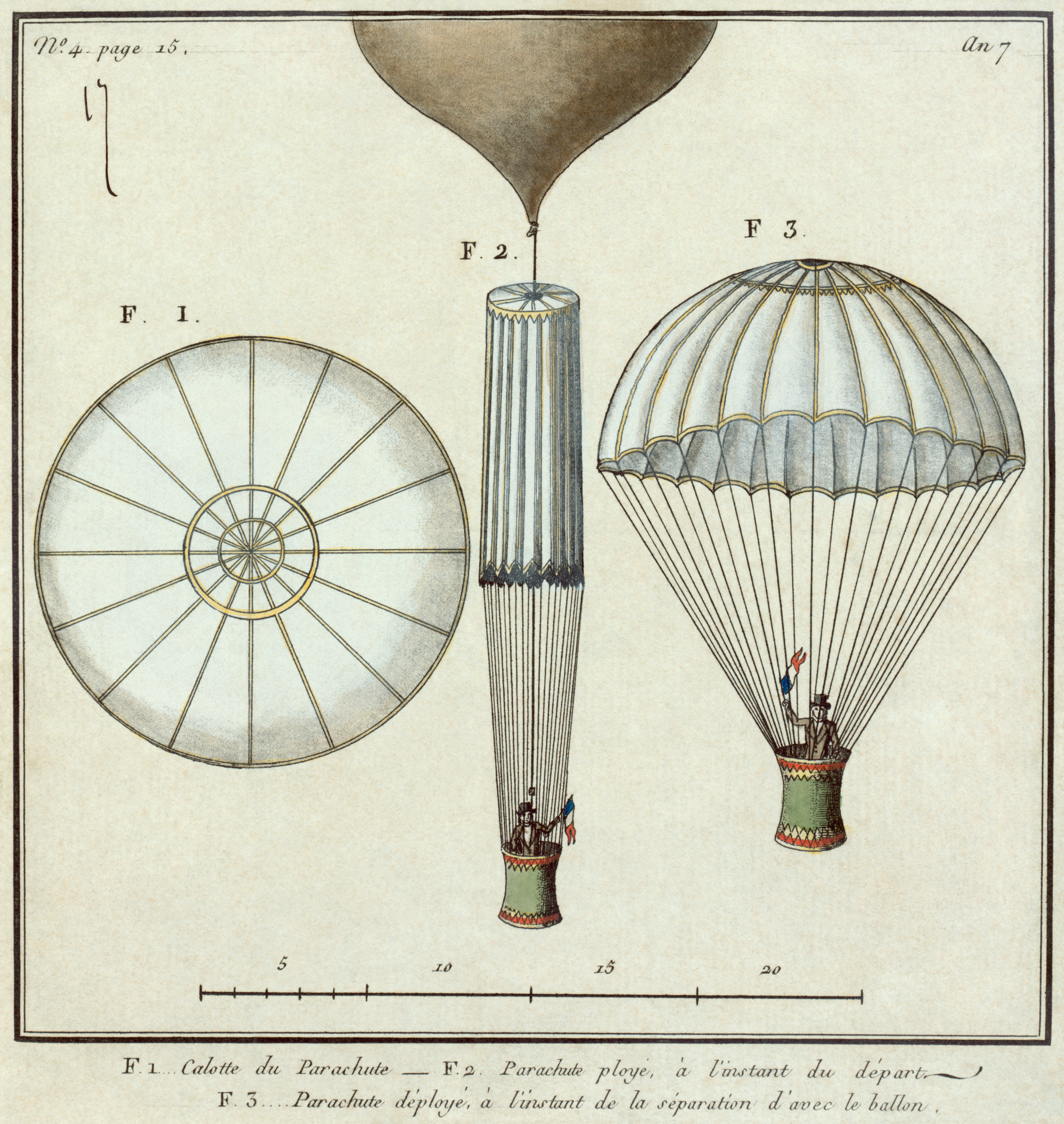
Schematic depiction of Garnerin's first parachute used in the Parc Monceau descent of 22 October 1797. Illustration dates from the early nineteenth century.

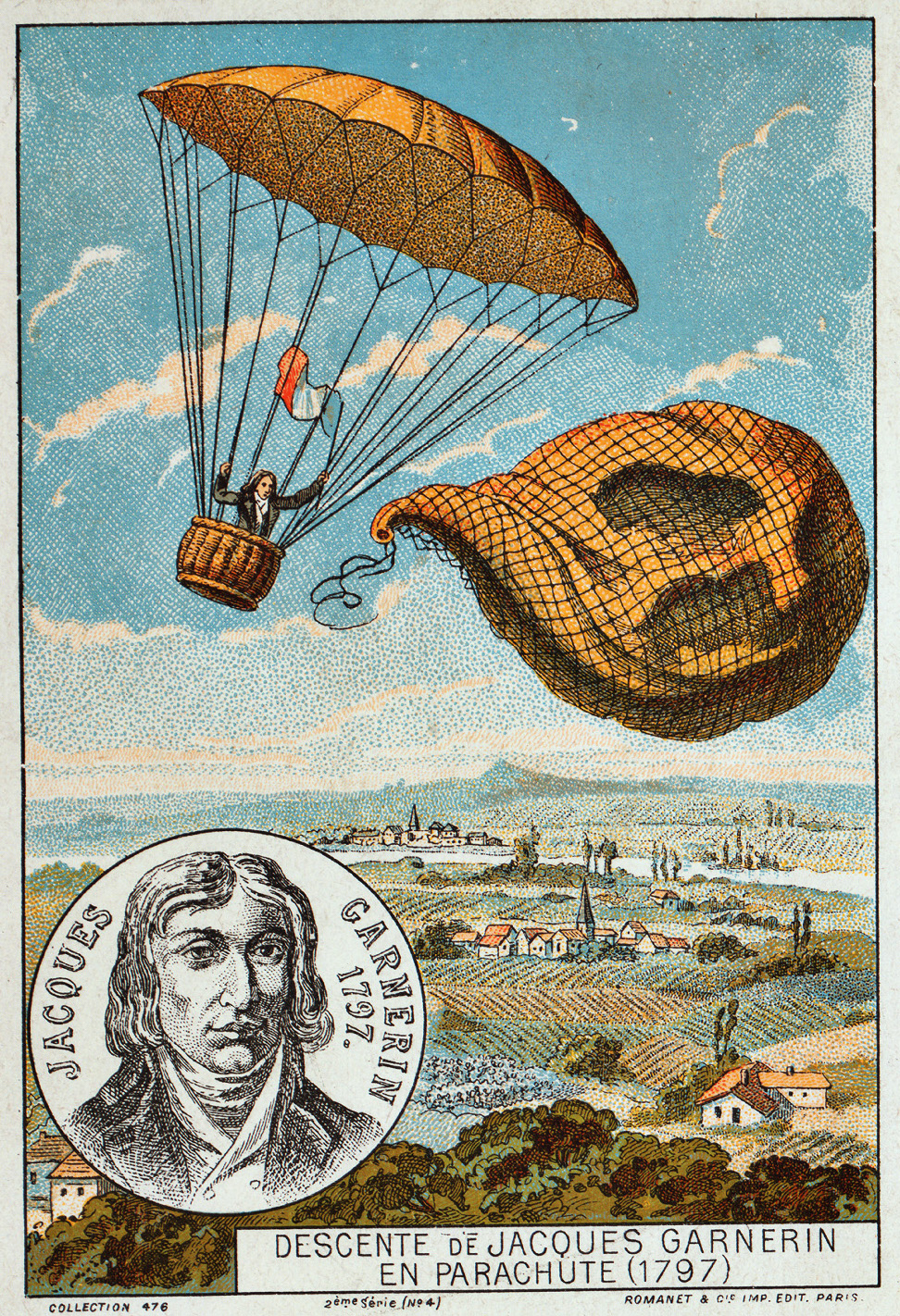
Jacques Garnerin releases his balloon and descends with the help of a parachute, 1797. Illustration from the late 19th century.

Jeanne Geneviève Garnerin (née Labrosse; 7 March 1775 – 14 June 1847) was a French balloonist and parachutist. She was the first to ascend solo and the first woman to make a parachute descent (in the gondola), from an altitude of 900 metres (3,000 ft) on 12 October 1799.

Labrosse first flew on 10 November 1798, one of the earliest women to fly in a balloon. (Note: On 20 May 1784, the Marchioness and Countess of Montalembert, the Countess of Podenas and Miss de Lagarde, flew in a tethered balloon in Paris. On 4 June 1784, in Lyon Élisabeth Thible was the first woman to fly in an untethered balloon. On 8 July 1798, Citoyenne Henri was the first woman balloonist to accompany André-Jacques Garnerin. His early publicity suggests that he may have brought other women along in the four months before bringing Labrosse on 10 November.) She was the wife of André-Jacques Garnerin, a hydrogen balloonist and inventor of the frameless parachute.

== Biography ==
Jeanne Labrosse was among the crowd watching André-Jacques Garnerin's first hydrogen balloon flight and parachute descent at Parc Monceau, Paris on 22 October 1797. She made his acquaintance, became his pupil, and flew with him on 10 November 1798 at Parc Monceau. She is sometimes described as the first woman in the world to fly in a balloon, but Élisabeth Thible made a free flight in 1784 and Citoyenne Henri flew with Garnerin on 8 July 1798, four months earlier. (Note: Some internet sources conflate the flights of 8 July and 10 November 1798, by Miss Henri and Miss Jeanne Labrosse, and derive the modernist myth of the first all-female ascent.)

On 12 October 1799, Labrosse ascended in a gondola with a balloon before detaching the balloon and descending in the gondola by parachute from an altitude of 900 meters. In doing so, she became the first woman to parachute. She went on to complete many ascents and parachute descents in towns across France and Europe.

=== Patent for parachute ===
On 11 October 1802, she filed a patent application on behalf of her husband for: "a device called a parachute, intended to slow the fall of the basket after the balloon bursts. Its vital organs are a cap of cloth supporting the basket and a circle of wood beneath and outside of the parachute and used to hold it open while climbing: it must perform its task at the moment of separation from the balloon, by maintaining a column of air." (Note: The patent application of Madam Garnerin un appareil dit parachute, destiné à ralentir la chute de la nacelle d'un ballon après l'explosion de celui-ci. Ses organes essentiels sont une calotte d'étoffe supportant la nacelle et un cercle de bois qui se trouve en dessous et à l'extérieur du parachute et servant à le tenir un peu ouvert lors de l'ascension : il doit faciliter son développement au moment de la séparation avec le ballon, en y maintenant une colonne d'air. Brevet n° 195, déposé le 11 octobre 1802)

== Touring England ==
André-Jacques Garnerin held the position of Official Aeronaut of France and was unofficially known as the aérostatier des fêtes publiques, so the couple visited England in 1802 during the Peace of Amiens. They completed a number of demonstration flights, including his first flight ascending from the Volunteer Ground in North Audley Street, Grosvenor Square, and a parachute descent to a field near St Pancras. This gave rise to the popular English doggerel:

Bold Garnerin went up
Which increased his Repute
And came safe to earth
In his Grand Parachute.

Jeanne Garnerin accompanied him on his third flight over London. One of her parachute descents was estimated at 8,000 feet (2,438 m). When the war between France and Great Britain resumed in 1803, the couple were forced to leave England and return to France, where she continued to make flights and descents.

== Family life ==
Garnerin's husband died in 1823. Garnerin later met French heroine Marie-Thérèse Figueur, Madame Sans-Gêne, who had fought in the French Revolutionary Wars and Napoleonic Wars, with whom she reportedly opened a table d'hôte restaurant.

Garnerin's niece, Élisa (Elizabeth), who was born in 1791, learned to fly balloons at age 15 and made 39 professional parachute descents from 1815 to 1836 in Italy, Spain, Russia, Germany, and France. (Note: Elizabeth Garnerin was especially popular in Italy, where she was hailed as the "Prima Aeroporista" (or First Parachutist) of France when she made her twenty-second and twenty-third descents in Milan (5 March and 5 April 1824). The crowds were delighted when she waved both French and Italian flags from the basket.)

== Commemoration ==
On 17 October 2006, the rue Jeanne Garnerin in Wissous, France was named in her honour.

== See also ==
- Citoyenne Henri – the first woman who accompanied André-Jacques Garnerin on a trip by balloon on 8 July 1798 from the Parc Monceau in Paris.
- Louis-Sébastien Lenormand – inventor and pioneer in parachuting.
