= Sophie Blanchard =

French balloonist (1778–1819)

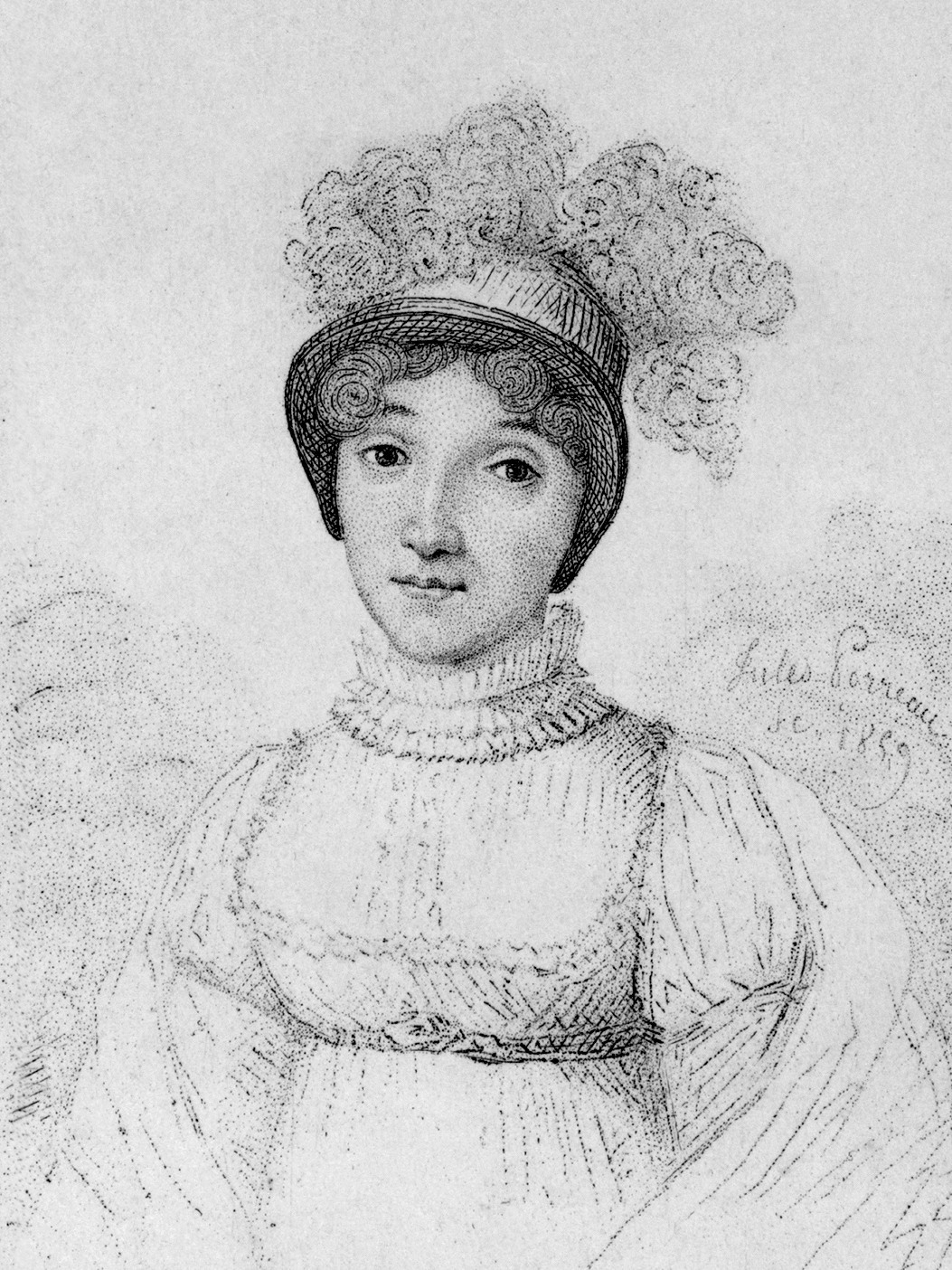
- 1859 engraving
- Born: 25 March 1778; Trois-Canons, Kingdom of France (now Yves, France)
- Died: 6 July 1819 (aged 41); Paris, France
- Cause of death: Balloon crash
- Known for: First woman to work as a professional balloonist
- Spouse: Jean-Pierre Blanchard
- Aviation career
- First flight: 1804

Sophie Blanchard (French pronunciation: [sɔfi blɑ̃ʃaʁ]; 25 March 1778 – 6 July 1819), commonly referred to as Madame Blanchard, (Note: Blanchard is also known by many combinations of her maiden and married names, including Madeleine-Sophie Blanchard, Marie Madeleine-Sophie Blanchard, Marie Sophie Armant and Madeleine-Sophie Armant Blanchard) was a French aeronaut and the wife of ballooning pioneer Jean-Pierre Blanchard. Blanchard was the first woman to work as a professional balloonist, and after her husband's death she continued ballooning, making more than 60 ascents. Known throughout Europe for her ballooning exploits, Blanchard entertained Napoleon Bonaparte, who promoted her to the role of "Aeronaut of the Official Festivals", replacing André-Jacques Garnerin. On the restoration of the monarchy in 1814 she performed for Louis XVIII, who named her "Official Aeronaut of the Restoration".

Ballooning was a risky business for the pioneers. Blanchard lost consciousness on a few occasions, endured freezing temperatures and almost drowned when her balloon crashed in a marsh. In 1819, she became the first woman to be killed in an aviation accident when, during an exhibition in the Tivoli Gardens in Paris, she launched fireworks that ignited the gas in her balloon. Her craft crashed on the roof of a house and she fell to her death.

== Biography ==
=== Early life and career ===
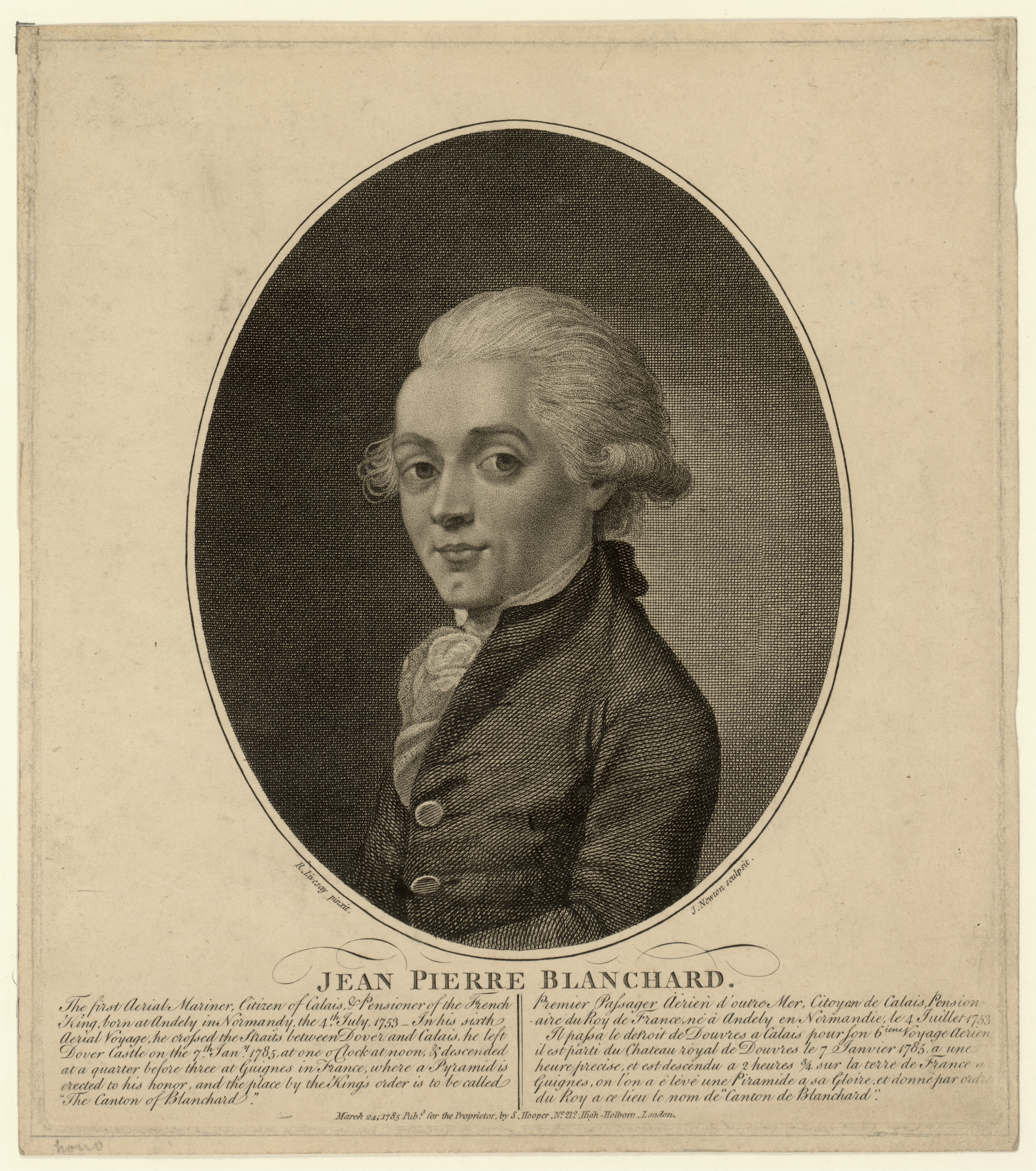
Jean Pierre Blanchard

Sophie Blanchard was born Marie Madeleine-Sophie Armant to Protestant parents at Trois-Canons, near La Rochelle. Little is known of her life before her marriage to Jean-Pierre Blanchard, the world's first professional balloonist. The date of her marriage is unclear; sources quote dates as early as 1794 or 1797, but most state 1804, the year of her first ascent. Blanchard had abandoned his first wife, Victoire Lebrun, and their four children to travel round Europe pursuing his ballooning career, and she later died in poverty. Variously described as Blanchard's "small, ugly, nervous wife", "small with sharp bird-like features" and later as "small and beautiful", Sophie was more at home in the sky than on the ground, where her nervous disposition meant she was easily startled. She was terrified of loud noises and of riding in carriages, but was fearless in the air. She and her husband were in an accident on a joint flight in 1807 (her 11th ascent, possibly his 61st), in which they crashed and he sustained a head injury. The shock apparently left her mute for a while.

Sophie made her first ascent in a balloon with Blanchard in Marseille on 27 December 1804. The couple faced bankruptcy as a result of Blanchard's poor business sense, and they believed a female balloonist was a novelty that might attract enough attention to solve their financial problems. She described the feeling as an "incomparable sensation". Sophie made a second ascent with Blanchard and for her third ascent on 18 August 1805, she flew solo from the garden of the Cloister of the Jacobins in Toulouse.

She was not the first woman balloonist. On 20 May 1784, the Marchioness and Countess of Montalembert, the Countess of Podenas and a Miss de Lagarde had taken a trip on a tethered balloon in Paris. Neither was she the first woman to ascend in an untethered balloon: in Blanchard's time, Citoyenne Henri, who had made an ascent with André-Jacques Garnerin in 1798, was widely credited with that ballooning first, although the honour actually belonged to Élisabeth Thible. Thible, an opera singer, had made an ascent to entertain Gustav III of Sweden in Lyon on 4 June 1784, fourteen years before Citoyenne Henri. Blanchard was, however, the first woman to pilot her own balloon and the first to adopt ballooning as a career.

On 7 March 1809, her husband died from injuries sustained on 20 February 1808 when he fell from his balloon in The Hague after suffering a heart attack. After his death, Sophie continued to make ascents, specialising in night flights, often staying aloft all night.

=== Solo career ===
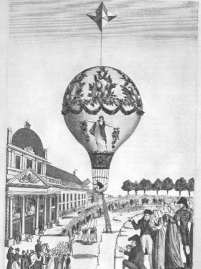
Ascent from the Champ de Mars, 24 June 1810

Sophie conducted experiments with parachutes as her husband had, parachuting dogs from her balloon, and as part of her entertainments she launched fireworks and dropped baskets of pyrotechnics attached to small parachutes. Other aeronauts were making names for themselves by demonstrating parachute jumps from the baskets of balloons, in particular the family of André-Jacques Garnerin, whose wife, daughter and niece all performed regularly. His niece, Élisa Garnerin, was Blanchard's chief rival as a female aeronaut, and it was rare for a suitable event to lack a performance by one or the other. Blanchard may have given some demonstrations of parachuting herself, but her primary interest was in ballooning.

The couple had still been in debt at the time of Blanchard's death, so to minimise her expenses, Sophie was as frugal as possible in her choice of balloon. She used a hydrogen-filled gas balloon (or Charlière), as it allowed her to ascend in a basket little bigger than a chair, and there was no requirement for the volume of material necessary for a hot-air balloon. A hydrogen balloon also freed her from having to tend a fire to keep the craft airborne. Having a smaller, easily inflatable balloon was also important in an era when "balloon riots" were common, and disappointed crowds were known to destroy balloons and attack aeronauts when balloons failed to go up as planned. Because she was small and light, she was able to cut back on the amount of gas used to inflate the balloon. Sophie had used, or at least owned, a hot-air balloon; Colonel Francis Maceroni recorded in his memoirs that she sold it to him in 1811 for £40.

She became a favourite of Napoleon, and he appointed her to replace André-Jacques Garnerin in 1804. Garnerin had disgraced himself by failing to control the balloon that he had sent up to mark Napoleon's coronation in Paris; the balloon eventually drifted as far as Rome, where it crashed into the Lago di Bracciano and became the subject of many jokes at Napoleon's expense. The title given to her by Napoleon is unclear: he certainly made her "Aeronaut of the Official Festivals" ("Aéronaute des Fêtes Officielles") with responsibility for organising ballooning displays at major events, but he may have also made her his Chief Air Minister of Ballooning, in which role she is reported to have drawn up plans for an aerial invasion of England. She was able to dissuade Napoleon from this impractical plan by pointing out that the prevailing winds over the Channel made such an invasion nearly impossible.

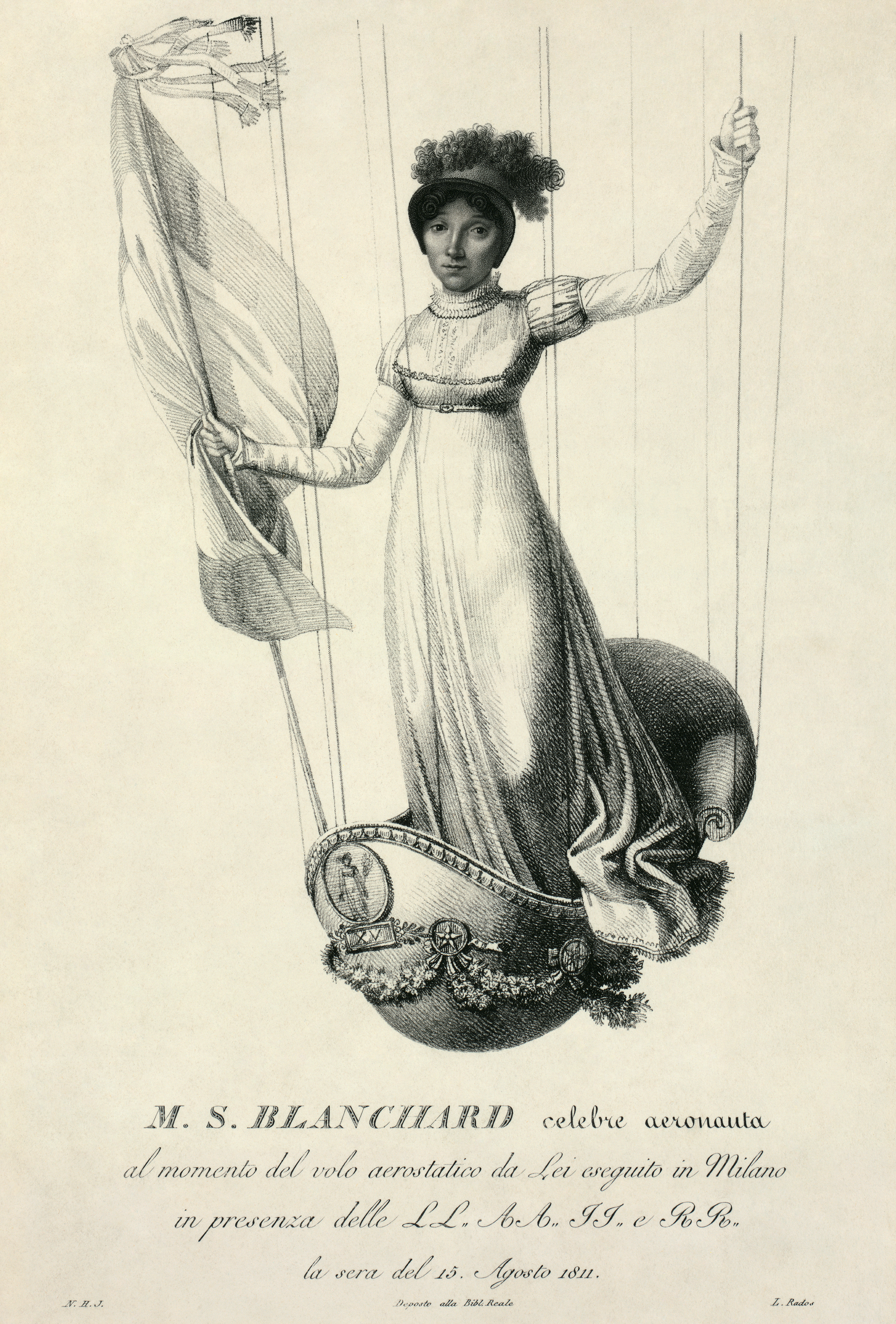
Sophie makes her ascent in Milan on 15 August 1811 to mark the 42nd birthday of Napoleon.

She made ascents for Napoleon's entertainment on 24 June 1810 from the Champ de Mars in Paris and at the celebration mounted by the Imperial Guard for his marriage to Marie-Louise of Austria. On the birth of Napoleon's son, Blanchard took a balloon flight over Paris from the Champs de Mars and threw out leaflets proclaiming the birth. She performed at the official celebration of his baptism at the Château de Saint-Cloud on 23 June 1811, with a firework display launched from the balloon, and again at the "Féte de l'Emperor" in Milan on 15 August 1811. She made an ascent in bad weather over the Campo Marte in Naples to accompany the review of the troops by Napoleon's brother-in-law Joachim Murat, the King of Naples, in 1811. When Louis XVIII entered Paris on 4 May 1814 after being restored to the French throne, Blanchard ascended in her balloon from the Pont Neuf as part of the triumphal procession. Louis was so taken with her performance that he dubbed her "Official Aeronaut of the Restoration". (Note: As Comte de Provence, Louis had earlier been a patron of balloon pioneer Pilâtre de Rozier, who had been the victim of the first fatal ballooning accident on 15 June 1785.)

Known throughout Europe, Blanchard drew large crowds for her ascents. In Frankfurt she was apparently the cause of the poor reception of Carl Maria von Weber's opera Silvana on its opening night, 16 September 1810: the people of the city flocked to see her demonstration while only a few attended the opera's debut. She gave many displays in Italy. In 1811 she travelled from Rome to Naples, splitting the journey in half with a stop after 60 miles (97 km), and later ascended again from Rome to a height of 12,000 feet (3,660 m) where she claimed that she fell into a profound sleep for a while before landing at Tagliacozzo. In the same year she again lost consciousness after having to ascend to avoid being trapped in a hailstorm near Vincennes. She spent 14½ hours in the air as a result. Sophie crossed the Alps by balloon, and on a trip to Turin on 26 April 1812 the temperature dropped so low that she suffered a nose bleed and icicles formed on her hands and face. She almost died on 21 September 1817 when, on a flight from Nantes (her 53rd), she mistook a marshy field for a safe landing spot. The canopy of her balloon became caught in a tree which caused the chair to tip over; Blanchard, entangled in the rigging, was forced into the water of the marsh and would have drowned had not help arrived soon after her landing. Sympathising with Marie Thérèse de Lamourous who was attempting to run a shelter for "fallen women" (La Miséricorde) in Bordeaux, she offered to donate the proceeds from one of her ascents to the venture. De Lamourous refused the offer on the grounds that she could not be the cause of another risking their life.

=== Death ===
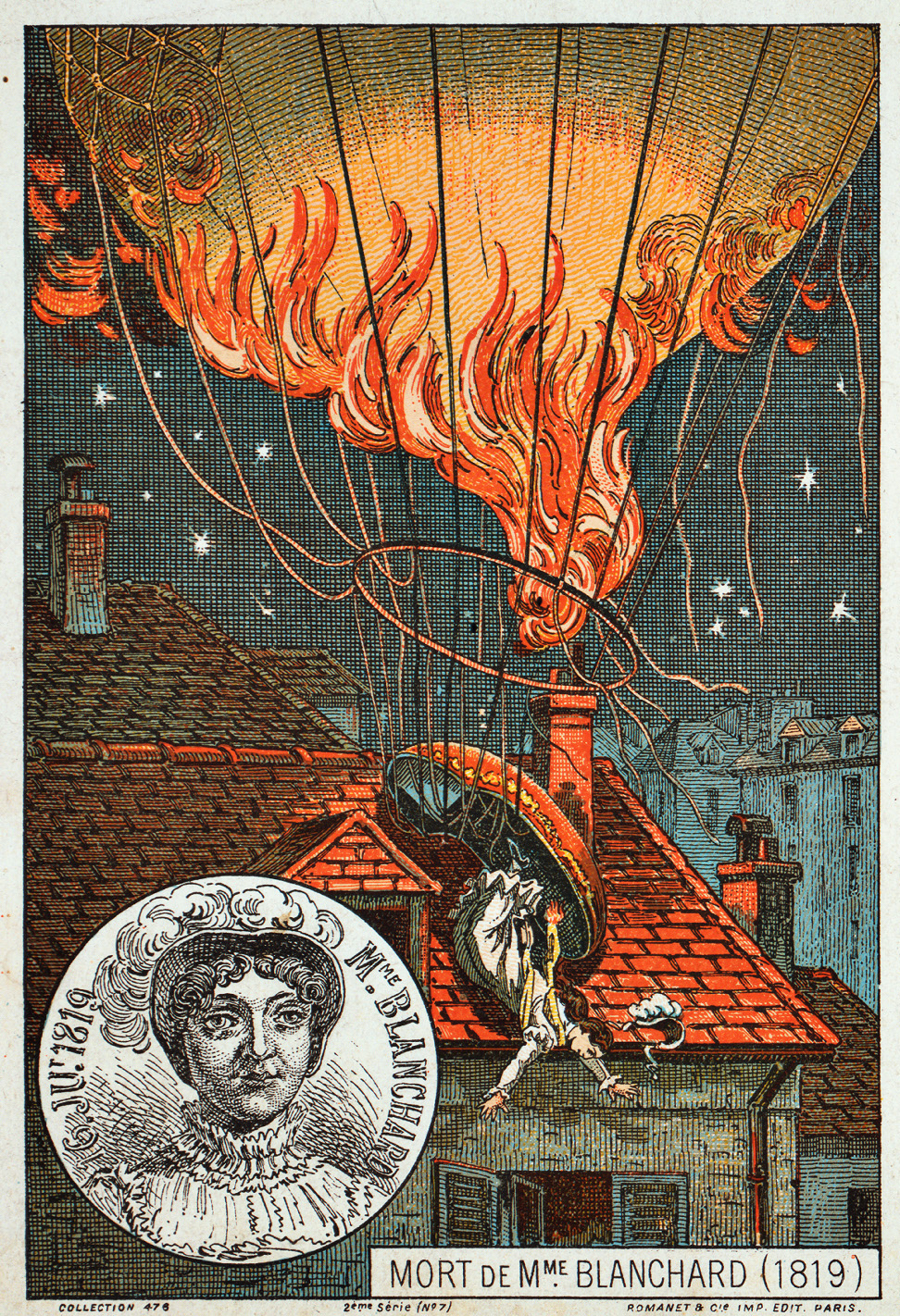
Death of Mme. Blanchard, an illustration from the late 19th century

On 6 July 1819, in the Tivoli Gardens in Paris, her hydrogen-filled balloon caught fire and Blanchard, entangled in the surrounding net, fell to her death.

Blanchard had performed regularly at the Tivoli Gardens, making ascents twice a week when she was in Paris. She had been warned repeatedly of the danger of using fireworks in her exhibitions. This display was to be a particularly impressive one with many more pyrotechnics than usual, and it appears that the warnings had made an impression on her. Some spectators implored her not to make the ascent, but others, eager to see the show, urged her on. One report suggested that she finally made up her mind and stepped into her chair with the words "Allons, ce sera pour la dernière fois" ("Let's go, this will be for the last time").

At about 10:30 p.m. (accounts differ as to the exact time), Blanchard began her ascent, wearing a white dress and a white hat topped with ostrich plumes, and carrying a white flag. The wind was blowing strongly, and it appears the balloon struggled to rise. By shedding ballast Blanchard managed to get some lift, but the balloon brushed through the trees as it ascended. Once she had cleared the treetops Blanchard began the display by waving her flag. The balloon was illuminated by baskets containing "Bengal fire", a slow-burning, coloured pyrotechnic.

A few moments after beginning the display, and while still ascending, the balloon was seen to be in flames. Some reports say that the balloon momentarily disappeared behind a cloud and that when it reappeared it was on fire—whatever the circumstances, the gas in the balloon was burning. Blanchard began to descend rapidly, but the balloon, caught in the wind, continued to move off from the pleasure gardens even as it went down. Some spectators thought these events were part of the show and applauded and shouted their approval. The balloon had not risen to any great height and, although the escaping gas was burning, the gas within the balloon maintained sufficient lift to prevent the craft plummeting directly to the ground. By rapidly shedding ballast Blanchard was able to slow the descent. Most reports say she appeared to be calm during the descent, but she was said to be wringing her hands in despair as the craft approached the ground. Rumours later circulated that she had gripped the chair of her craft so tightly that "several arteries had snapt through the effort."

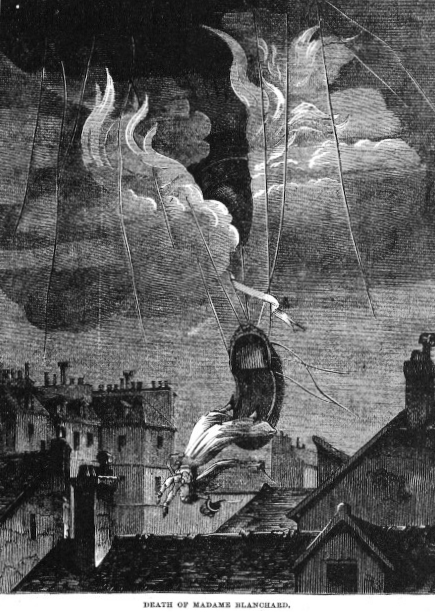
Another image of her death from 1869

Just above the rooftops of the Rue de Provence the balloon's gas was exhausted, and the craft struck the roof of a house. (Note: Most sources do not mention the number of the house but some say number 15 or number 16, and some claim the building was a hotel.) It was thought likely that she would have survived had that been the end of the incident, but the ropes holding the chair to the body of the balloon may have burnt through, or the impact may have thrown her forwards, with the result that Blanchard, trapped in the netting of the balloon, pitched over the side of the roof into the street below. John Poole, an eyewitness, described her final moments:

There was a terrible pause, then Mme Blanchard caught up in the netting of her balloon, fell with a crash upon the slanting roof of a house in the Rue de Provence, and then into the street, where she was taken up a shattered corpse.

Some reports credit her with crying out "À moi!" ("help", or literally, "to me"), as she struck the roof. Although the crowds rushed to her assistance and attempts were made to save her, she either died instantly, from a broken neck, or at most ten minutes later.

The most likely cause of the accident seemed to be that the fireworks attached to her balloon had been knocked out of position by a tree as she ascended; possibly the balloon was heavily loaded and failed to rise quickly enough. When she lit the fuses the fireworks headed towards the balloon instead of away from it; one of them burned a hole in the fabric, igniting the gas. One man reportedly spotted the problem and shouted to her not to light the fuses, but his cries were drowned out by the cheering of the crowd. Later reports suggested she had left the gas valve open, allowing sparks to ignite the gas and set fire to the balloon, or that her balloon was of poor construction and allowed gas to escape throughout the ascent.

=== Legacy ===
Norwich Duff, who had witnessed Blanchard's ascent and the accident, recorded:

The effect of so shocking an accident on the minds of several thousand people assembled for amusement, and in high spirits, may easily be imagined...

On hearing she had died, the proprietors of the Tivoli Gardens immediately announced that the admission fees would be donated for the support of her children, and some spectators stood at the gates appealing to the citizens of Paris for donations. The appeal raised 2,400 francs, but after the collection it was discovered that she had no surviving children, so the money was used instead to erect a memorial, topped with a representation of her balloon in flames, above her grave in Père Lachaise Cemetery. Her tombstone was engraved with the epitaph "victime de son art et de son intrépidité" ("victim of her art and intrepidity"). The remainder of the money, about 1,000 francs, was donated to the Lutheran Église des Billettes which Blanchard had attended. Though not rich, at the time of her death she had cleared the debts left to her by her husband and was financially secure. Each of her ascents had cost her around 1,000 francs, not including the cost of maintenance of the balloon. In her will she left property worth between 1,000 and 50,000 francs to the daughter of some acquaintances.

The story of her death was recounted throughout Europe. Jules Verne mentioned her in Five Weeks in a Balloon and, in The Gambler, Fyodor Dostoevsky likened the thrill of committing oneself in gambling to the sensation that Blanchard must have felt as she fell. For others, her death proved a cautionary tale, either as an example of a woman exceeding her station (as with Grenville Mellen, who said that it proved "a woman in a balloon is either out of her element or too high in it") or as the price of vanity for attempting such spectacular shows. Charles Dickens commented "The jug goes often to the well, but is pretty sure to get cracked at last". A novel inspired by Blanchard's story, Linda Donn's The Little Balloonist, was published in 2006.

Released in 2019, The Aeronauts features a character, Amelia Rennes (played by Felicity Jones), who was partly inspired by Blanchard.

== See also ==
- List of firsts in aviation
