= Francis Maceroni =

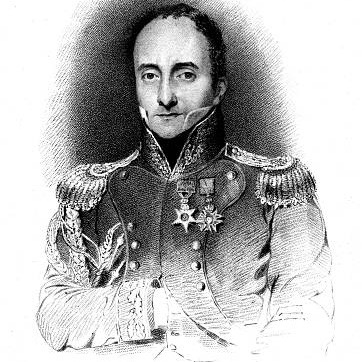
- Born: Francis Macirone; 1788; Manchester, England
- Died: 26 July 1846 (aged 57–58); 1 Mortimer Terrace, Latimer Road, Shepherd's Bush, Middlesex, London, UK
- Resting place: Pauper's Grave, Kensal Green Cemetery, London, UK
- Education: Three Catholic Schools in Britain
- Spouse(s): Elizabeth Ann Williams-Wynne & bigamous marriage to Elizabeth Ann's younger sister, Bethena Charlotte Williams
- Children: 6

Colonel Francis Maceroni (sometimes known as "Count Maceroni"), born Francis Macirone (1788–1846), was a soldier, diplomat, revolutionary, balloonist (as recorded by Sophie Blanchard), author and inventor.

"Maceroni" was the original version of his family name, the variant spelling of Macirone having been adopted by his grandfather to distance himself from an unsavoury relation. Francis opted to resume the original spelling, but is sometimes listed with the variant spelling.

== Early life ==
Born in 1788 the son of Peter Augustus Macirone (Pietro Bonaventura Augusto Macirone), an Italian merchant and former school teacher living in England, Maceroni was sent in 1803, aged fifteen, to live in Rome with one of his uncles, Giorgio, who was then Post-Master General to Pius VII. On his father's wishes, Maceroni was there apprenticed in the counting-house of the Torlonia banking family. Being clearly unsuited to copying and book-keeping work however, he was soon more usefully employed by Torlonia in dealing with the many English-speaking visitors to Rome, who sought the banker's services. In 1804, in the company of the architect Robert Smirke, who was then conducting a Grand Tour, Maceroni made the journey on foot, and over several days, from Tivoli to Naples, along the mountain paths of the Apennines and passing through Palestrina, Cori, Arpino and Monte Cassino before descending to Capua and Naples; Smirke having taken many sketches of the classical remains that had come across along their route. At the monastery of Monte Cassino, they saw on display a huge thigh-bone purportedly of St. Christopher, but which both Maceroni and Smirke suspected to be that of an elephant or mammoth.

Maceroni became a Colonel of Cavalry and served as aide de camp to Joachim Murat, the King of Naples during the Napoleonic Wars (later writing his biography) and fought with the Spanish insurgents in 1822-23 during the Trienio Liberal.

While serving as an aide to Murat, Maceroni introduced the Neapolitan Court to archery, cricket, and the concept of weekly dining parties. Unfortunately, cricket did not survive his departure.

== Maceroni's steam carriage ==
In 1825 while living in Manchester, he became interested in the work of Sir Goldsworthy Gurney and attached himself to Gurney's Regent's Park workshop on the recommendation of Sir Anthony Carlisle, ostensibly to work on his own inventions. He stayed six months and became involved enough in Gurney's work – he witnessed one of the early carriage contracts – that he persuaded several friends to invest in the enterprise.

After a time in Constantinople helping the Turks fight the Russians, he returned to London in 1831 and joined forces with Gurney's former employee, carpenter John Squire. In 1833, the two had constructed their own steam carriage. It was a straightforward vehicle that carried up to fourteen passengers, developed 30 horsepower (22 kW) at 14 mph (23 km/h) and ascended hills with ease. The carriage ran for hire for some weeks between Paddington and Edgware with no serious mechanical problems and in 1834, after a new toll relief bill was passed by the House of Commons, Maceroni built a new and larger carriage. But the bill failed in the House of Lords and Maceroni fell into financial difficulties. To meet the terms of the Belgian and French patents he had negotiated earlier, he shipped his two remaining carriages to Brussels and Paris in the care of the Italian speculator Colonel d'Asda. D'Asda drove the carriages around to great publicity for several months then sold them and disappeared with the money. In 1835, Maceroni published a book on road steam power and tried to raise new capital, but a railway investment panic in 1837 doomed his chances and in 1841 the disclosure of serious mismanagement ended with the seizure of all his assets.

Maceroni lived in England for much of his life, and published his memoirs in 1838.

== Publications ==
- Interesting Facts Relating to the Fall and Death of Joachim Murat, King of Naples, London: 1817.
- An appeal to the British nation on the affairs of South America, London: 1819.
- Practical Instructions For the Improvement of the Carriage Pavements of London, London: 1827.
- Project for armed unions : foot-lancer system recommended for volunteer corps throughout the country, London: 1831.
- Two letters: on the character of the Duke of Wellington, and on defence in the streets, London: 1832.
- Hints to Paviors; With Various Plans Proposed for the Improvement of Carriage Pavements, Also a Paper on The Increasing of Daylight in London, London: 1833.
- A Few Facts Concerning Elementary Locomotion, London: 1834.
- Proofs and demonstrations of the powers and qualities of Colonel Maceroni's patent steam carriage, London: 1835.
- Memoirs of the Life and Adventures of Colonel Maceroni, 2 vols., London: 1838.
