= Louis-Sébastien Lenormand =

French physicist

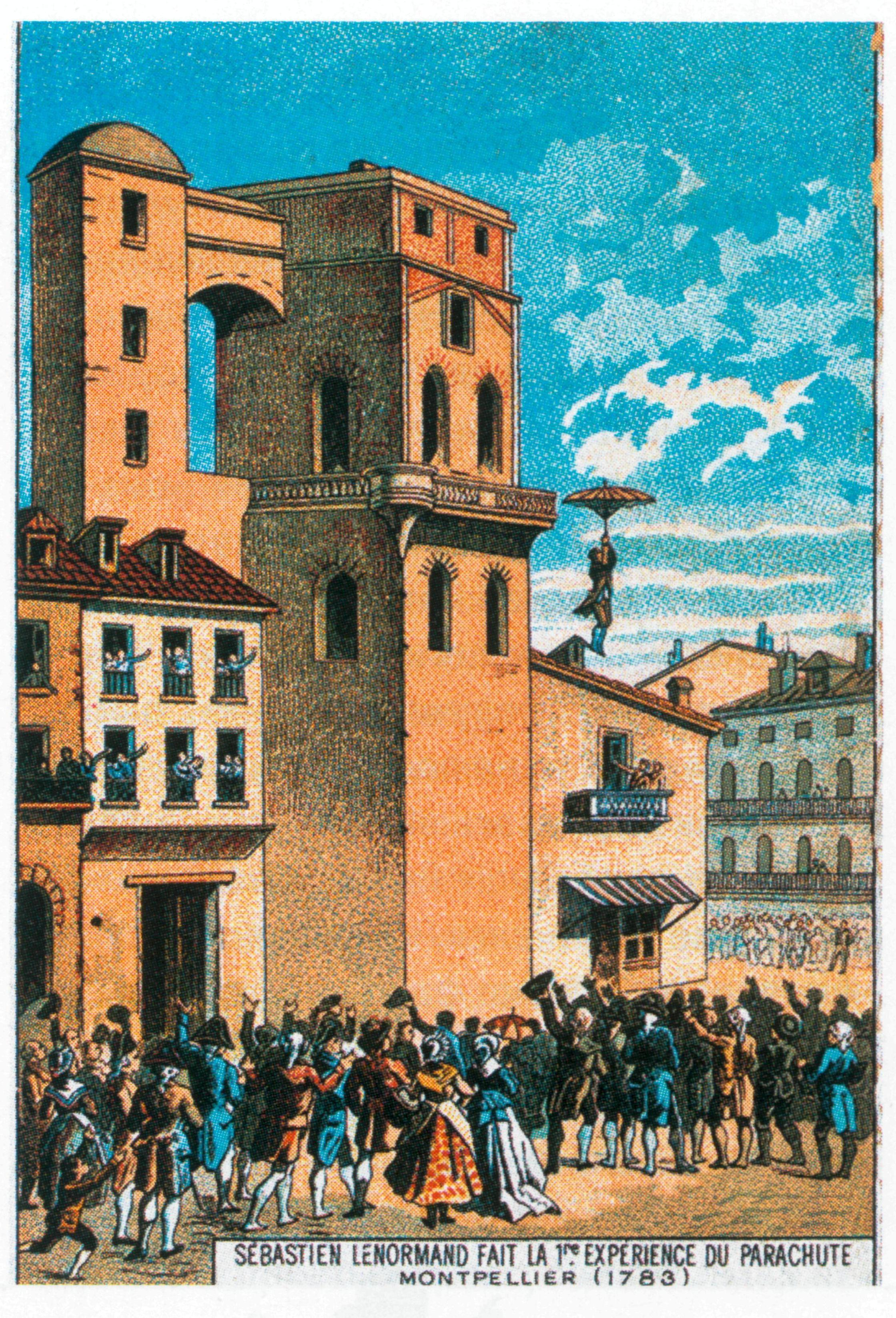
Lenormand jumps from the tower of the Montpellier observatory, 1783. Illustration from the late 19th Century.

Louis-Sébastien Lenormand (May 25, 1757 – April 4, 1837) was a French chemist, physicist, inventor, monk, and the first man in history to use a parachute.

== Early life ==
Lenormand was born in Montpellier on May 25, 1757 as the son of a clockmaker. Between 1775 and 1780, he studied physics and chemistry under Lavoisier and Berthollet in Paris, where he also got involved with the administration of saltpeter. In this position he learned of the use of scientific and mathematical knowledge in the production of gunpowder. After returning to his natal town, he worked in his father's clock shop while immersing himself in the intellectual community and starting his experiments with parachuting, inspired by the performance of a Thai equilibrist who used a parasol for balance. Before performing the public jump from the observatory tower, Lenormand tested his parachutes using animals.

== First parachute ==
Lenormand is considered the first man to make a witnessed descent with a parachute and is also credited with coining the term parachute, from the Latin prefix para meaning "against", an imperative form of parare = to avoid, avert, defend, resist, guard, shield or shroud, from paro = to parry, and the French word chute for "fall", hence the word "parachute" literally means an aeronautic device "against a fall". After making a jump from a tree with the help of a pair of modified umbrellas, Lenormand refined his contraption and on December 26, 1783^{1} jumped from the tower of the Montpellier observatory in front of a crowd that included Joseph Montgolfier, using a 14 foot (4.3 m) parachute with a rigid wooden frame. His intended use for the parachute was to help entrapped occupants of a burning building to escape unharmed. Lenormand was succeeded by André-Jacques Garnerin, who made the first parachute descent from high altitude in a gondola attached to a balloon, with the help of a non-rigid or collapsible parachute on October 22, 1797, and his wife Jeanne Geneviève Labrosse who made a similar descent two years later.

== Career as "professor of technology" ==
After this public demonstration, Lenormand devoted himself to establishing the science of "pure technology". To this end, he first became a Carthusian monk, as the monastery in Saïx near Castres allowed him to continue his "profane" studies. When during the French Revolution he had to renounce his priesthood and marry, he moved to Albi to teach technology at a college newly founded by his father-in-law. In 1803, he moved to Paris where he obtained a job at the excise office, part of the finance ministry. During his time at the excise office, Lenormand started publishing in technology journals and filed patents for a paddle boat, a clock successfully installed at the Paris Opera, and a public lighting system. When he was removed from his job in 1815, Lenormand got involved even more in publishing, first establishing Les annales de l’industrie nationale et étrangère (The Annals of National and Foreign Industry) and Le Mercure technologique (The Technological Mercury), and, starting in 1822 and continuing until his death in 1837, twenty-volumes of Le Dictionnaire technologique (The Technologic Dictionary). During that time, he also published manuals on such diverse topics as foodstuff and bookbinding.

In 1830, Lenormand returned to Castres and, following his estrangement from his wife and her family, renounced his marriage and resumed his religious life as "Brother Chrysostom". He died there on April 4, 1837 at age 79. In his death certificate, his profession was given as "professor of theology" as the term technology was still too new at the time.

== Notes ==
- ^1 The date differs by source. December 26, 1783 is the most widely reported date.
