= Élisa Garnerin =

French balloonist

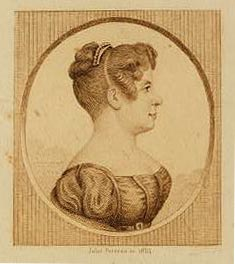
- 1854 print of the balloonist
- Born: 1791
- Died: 1853 (aged 61–62)
- Occupation: Aeronaut

Élisa Garnerin (1791 – 1853) was a French balloonist and parachutist. She was the niece of the pioneer parachutist André-Jacques Garnerin, and took advantage of his name and of the novelty of a woman performing what were at the time extremely daring feats. She was a determined businesswoman, and at times got into trouble with the police for the disturbance her performances caused, failure to pay all taxes due and failure to deliver all that her advertising had promised. She toured the provinces of France, Spain, Italy, and other parts of Europe, making 39 descents in all between 1815 and 1835.

== Family ==
Élisa Garnerin was born in 1791. She was the niece of André-Jacques Garnerin (1769–1823). Her uncle made his first parachute jump from a balloon in the Parc Monceau on 22 October 1797. He was not the first to use a parachute, since Louis-Sébastien Lenormand had descended by parachute at Montpellier in 1783, but his jump from a balloon caused so much public excitement that from then on no great official festival was complete without a jump by Andre-Jacques Garnerin, the official aérostier des fêtes publiques. Elisa was the daughter of Jean-Baptiste-Olivier Garnerin, "physician, author of several inventions, former government commissary to the armies". He had played a role in the French Revolution, and testified against Marie Antoinette before the revolutionary tribunal.

== First parachute jumps ==
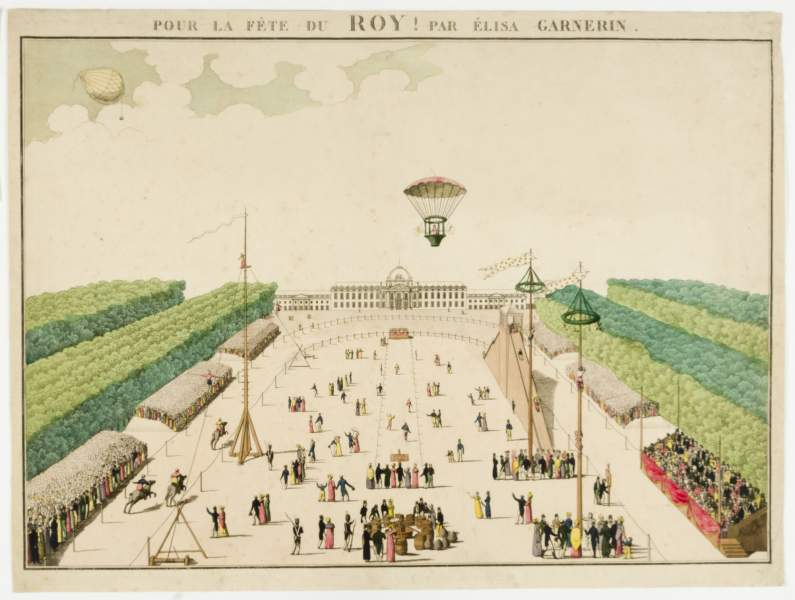
Poster for a balloon trial and parachute jump by Élisa, possibly in 1815

In August 1815 Élisa's father had the idea of profiting from the Garnerin name and giving Paris the new experience of a woman descending by means of a parachute. With Napoleon finally defeated at Waterloo the people of Paris wanted festivals and distractions. Balloons were very popular at the time, with balloonists such as Étienne-Gaspard Robert, Jean Margat, and Sophie Blanchard, who died in 1819 during one of her brave ascents. The publicity given to Élisa Garnerin was more effective than that of any of these rivals. It included notices in the Moniteur, Journal de Paris, Constitutionnel and Quotidienne, posters on every wall and pamphlets distributed to the national guards and the municipal employees.

Elisa made an ascent on 20 September 1815 from the bowling green at the Jardin de Tivoli.Spectators included the King of Prussia and his son, the Prince Royal. The wind was quite strong, and quickly carried away a small pilot balloon. However, Elisa climbed into the car and to the applause of the audience rose rapidly. After eleven and a half minutes she left the balloon with her parachute, and descended majestically for over five minutes, landing safely near Meudon. On 2 May 1816 Elisa made an ascent on a calm day with a wind from the southeast. She crossed the Seine, left the car and parachuted down to the Bois de Boulogne. The balloon continued to rise and was carried away towards the plain of Montrouge.

Elisa and her sister were invited to perform for the Fête of Saint Louis on 25 August 1816. It was announced that while the sisters ascended Elisa would play the harp and sing verses in honour of the King and his family. The women tried three times, but the balloon would not rise and the crowd became angry. Elisa went up alone, and after 15 minutes came down near the Bois de Boulogne. Madame Blanchard also performed at this fete, and was applauded by the masses as she rose in her balloon from the Champ de Mars.

On 15 September 1816 Élisa was to jump at the Champ de Mars in front of a large crowd. The ascent was preceded by a horse race. Élisa was accompanied by her sister Eugénie, who was jumping for the first time. A trial balloon was launched at 5:00 p.m. to determine the wind direction, and at 5:30 the two sisters climbed into the basket. The line was cut and the balloon rose a few feet, but then came down again, almost touching some spectators. Élisa got out and the lightened balloon carried Eugénie south towards the Bois de Boulogne. It almost touched ground near the Porte Maillot, and Eugénie was about to get out when it rose again. Over the Plaine de Monceau Eugénie detached the parachute from the basket and came down to earth easily, while the balloon was lost in the sky. Around 6:00 Eugénie was brought back in triumph to the École Militaire, where she was applauded by the spectators. The festival was over.

== Difficulties with the police ==
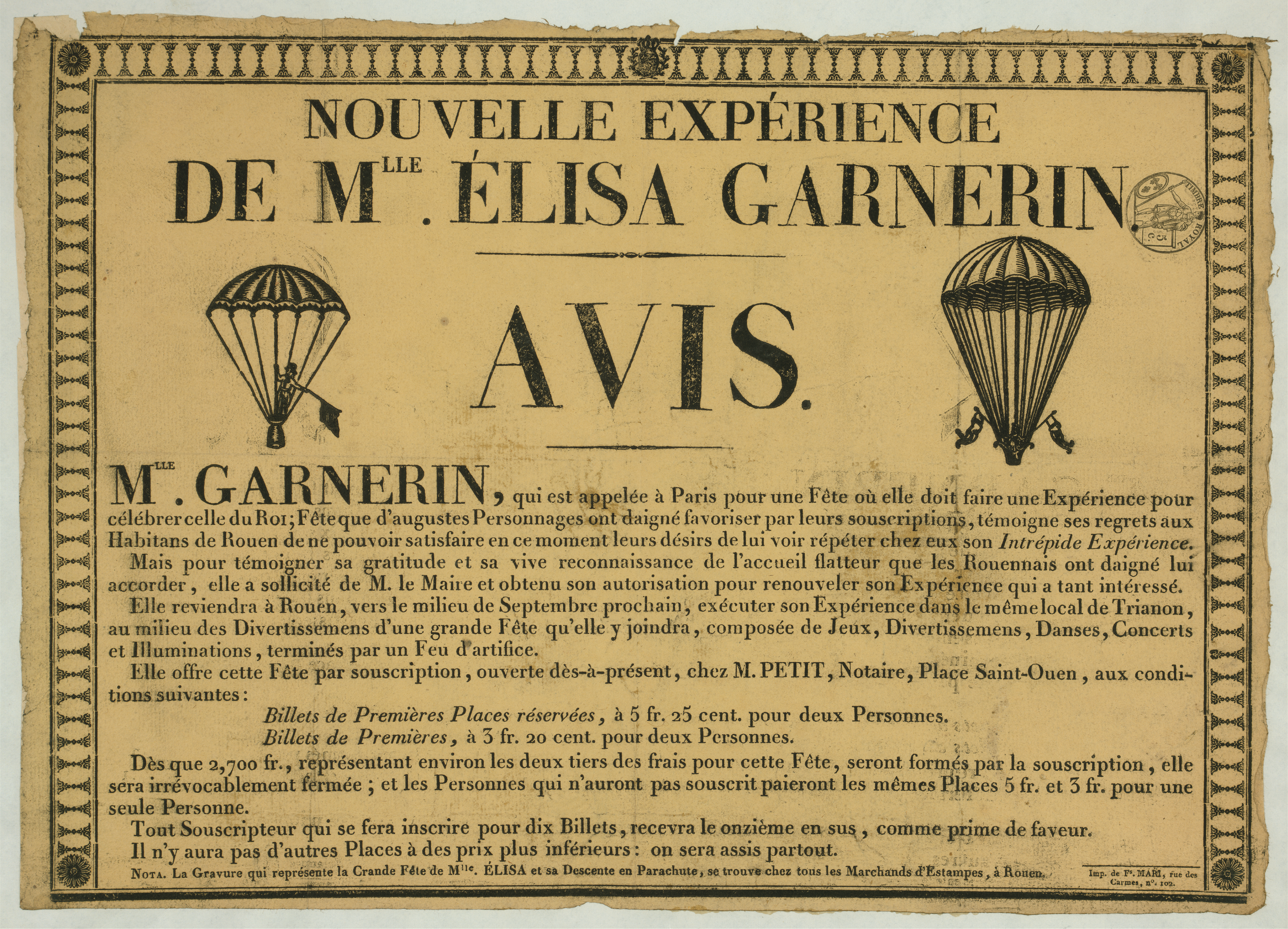
Advertisement for a Fete in Rouen which would include a parachute jump, games, entertainment, dances, concerts, lights and a firework display

The family constantly complained about the shares of the proceeds that was given to the poor and to the Royal Academy of Music. Jean-Baptiste-Olivier Garnerin was caught more than once trying to hide part of the proceeds to avoid these shares. Élisa Garnerin tried many projects that did not succeed. She always met hostility from the Paris police. They disliked the crowds drawn by the balloon festivals, which took considerable effort to control. The crowds ransacked the vegetable gardens which surrounded the Champ de Mars at that time, causing many complaints. The police had a strong card in the deposition by Élisa's father against Marie Antoinette, despite the many protestations of loyalty to the monarchy by father and daughter, and used this as an excuse to refuse permission for further exhibitions in the capital.

== The provinces and Madrid ==
For more than five year Élisa gave demonstrations in the provinces and abroad. In September 1817 she appeared in Rouen, in February 1818 in Bordeaux, in April 1818 in Madrid, (Note: One source dates the Madrid experience to April 1820. However, in June 1818 Élisa published a "Copy of the letter addressed to His Excellency the French ambassador to the Spanish court, by Mlle Elisa Garnerin, published to confound the slanders spread against her on the occasion of her experience in Madrid".) in September 1819 in Orléans, in September 1821 in Grenoble, in June 1821 in Marseille and in June 1822 in Lyon. The show in Madrid was a fiasco. There was the usual storm of publicity, then the event was postponed from 19 April to 23 April, then to 3 May and finally to 11 May. On that day there was a huge crowd. The king and queen were to attend and the event was fixed for 5:00 p.m. At the last minute handwritten posters announced that the experiment could not take place. Élisa and her father were taken to prison for their own protection, and left that night to return to France. They reimbursed the price of the seats, but kept the subscription money.

Élisa's 28 June 1818 ascent at Bordeaux was made despite a strong wind. As she rose, waving a white flag, the balloon was quickly carried southward towards the harbour. Elisa separated from the balloon with her parachute, but a cross-current carried it into the middle of the river, where she was set down. Two boats were ready, and brought her back to safety. The account said she was terrified by the time the boats arrived. In fact she had attached a float to the parachute so she could descend safely into the Garonne.

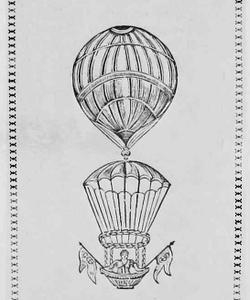
Illustration from the publicity for the Madrid trial

Élisa performed at the Congress of Aix-la-Chapelle (1818), where the German lady balloonist Wilhelmina Reichard also made an ascent, disappeared from sight and eventually landed near Cologne. Élisa rented chairs and sold seats in the balloon basket to the more daring. However, she hurt herself in a fall from the basket. The balloon flew off and was retrieved at Stuttgart. By May 1819 she had made 14 parachute descents despite the protests of her uncle, who felt his reputation was being usurped. In September 1819 Élisa announced that a magnificent fete would be held at the old burial ground in Orléans featuring the ascent of a balloon to 1,000 feet (300 m). She did not provide the promised wonders, was reported to the magistrates and was taken "to a vile prison, where she will be brought before the Tribunal of Correctional Police!"

== Innovations ==
As she gained experience, her father made continued improvements to the parachute, increasing its size and strength and greatly reducing its weight. In Grenoble she had the descent undertaken by a 12-year-old girl. In May 1819 Élisa was temporarily back in Paris, where she proposed to attempt a balloon ascent and parachute descent with a perfected balloon in the shape of a fish, which would somehow give it the ability to "move forward". She asked for a subsidy of 15,000 francs. The Minister said this was insane. In April 1820 Élisa proposed a huge project combining horses races with balloon trials, but apparently received no official response. At the end of 1821 she proposed a "Royal Agricultural Show and Royal French Races". This was rejected, and Elisa was refused permission to use the Champ de Mars for a spectacle similar to that of September 1816. She tried again in December 1822 and February 1823, and finally in July 1823 was allowed to use the Champ de Mars again.

== Last years ==
Élisa now spent five years in Italy. She was in Milan in 1824 and 1825, where she was seen by "The Imperial Majesty of Austria and all the sovereigns of Italy." She appeared in Verona and Venice, where for her 28th descent she parachuted down to the lagoon, using a float her father had invented. She was in Turin in 1827 and returned to Paris in 1828, where she organised horse races combined with gymnastic, equestrian, and balloon exercises. For eight years she toured through Europe. Back in Paris, on 22 May 1835 she executed her 39th and last parachute descent at the Champ de Mars. Élisa Garnerin died in Paris in April 1853.

== Sources ==
- Caron, P.; Gével, Cl. (January 1912), Yung, Eugène; Alglave, Emile (eds.), "Mademoiselle Élisa Garnerin Aéronaute", La Revue politique et littéraire: Revue des cours littéraires, Paris: Germer Baillière
- Elisa Garnerin (1791-1853) (in French), BnF: Bibliotheque nationale de France
- Garnerin, Elisa (3 June 1818), Copie de la lettre adressée à S. Exc. l'ambassadeur de France près la cour d'Espagne, par Mlle Élisa Garnerin, publiée pour confondre les calomnies répandues contre elle à l'occasion de son expérience à Madrid, impr. de P. Coudert, p. 4
- Kotar, S.L.; Gessler, J.E. (2010-12-20), Ballooning: A History, 1782-1900, McFarland, ISBN 978-0-7864-4941-5
- Soroka, Marina (2017-03-27), The Summer Capitals of Europe, 1814-1919, Taylor & Francis, ISBN 978-1-351-81347-1
