= Élisabeth Thible =

French balloonist (1757–1785)

- Born: 8 March 1757
- Died: 13 February 1785 (aged 27)
- Citizenship: French
- Aviation career
- Famous flights: first woman on record to fly in an untethered hot air balloon

Élisabeth Thible, or Elizabeth Tible (née Estrieux, 8 March 1757 – 13 February 1785), was the first woman to make a flight in an untethered hot air balloon. She was born in Lyon, France, on 8 March 1757. On 4 June 1784, eight months after the first crewed balloon flight, Thible flew with a Monsieur Fleurant on board a hot air balloon christened La Gustave in honour of King Gustav III of Sweden's visit to Lyon.

== Ballooning ==
Monsieur Fleurant originally planned to fly the hot air balloon with Count Jean-Baptiste de Laurencin, but the count gave his position on The Gustave to Élisabeth Thible. (Note: Count Jean-Baptiste de Laurencin (1740–1812) was one of the six passengers on the traumatic flight of the Montgolfier balloon Flesselles on 19 January 1784. The flight was about 720 seconds, and was piloted by Joseph Montgolfier, had ended dramatically when the balloon started to tear and smoulder. Although all passengers were unhurt, some attributed the accident as the reason the Count de Laurencin gave Élisabeth Thible his spot.)

When the balloon left the ground Thible, dressed as the Roman goddess Minerva, and Fleurant sang two duets from Monsigny's La Belle Arsène, a celebrated opera of the time. The flight lasted 45 minutes, covered 4 kilometres (2.5 mi), and achieved an estimated altitude of 1,500 metres (4,900 ft). It was witnessed by King Gustav III of Sweden in whose honour the balloon was named. During the bumpy landing Thible turned an ankle as the basket hit the ground. She was credited by Fleurant with the success of the flight both because she fed the balloon's fire box en route and by exhibiting her remarkable courage.

== Private life ==
Little is known of Madame Thible; she is described as the abandoned spouse (épouse délaissée) of a Lyon merchant. No record of her survives as a professional opera singer. She died in Paris on 13 February 1785.

== Film ==
- Venus im Wolkenschiff (Venus in the Cloud-ship) – WDR Fernsehen film by A. Reeker with Anouk Plany as Élisabeth Thible

== See also ==
- Sophie Blanchard – French balloonist (1778–1819)
