= André-Jacques Garnerin =

French balloonist and inventor of the frameless parachute (1769–1823)

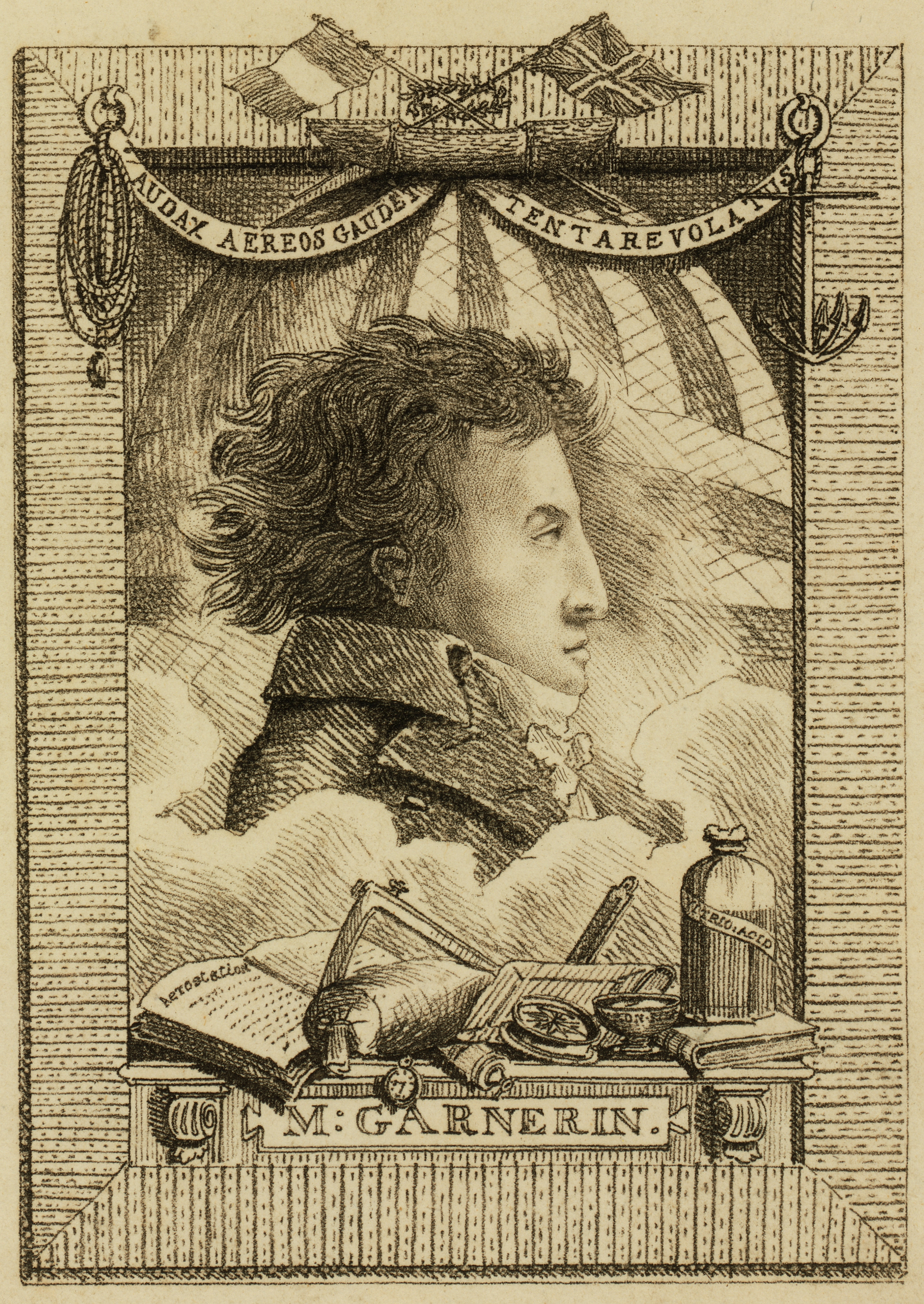
- Born: 31 January 1769; Paris, France
- Died: 18 August 1823 (aged 54); Paris, France
- Known for: Pioneer balloonist and parachuter

André-Jacques Garnerin (French: [ɑ̃dʁeʒak ɡaʁn(ə)ʁɛ̃]; 31 January 1769 – 18 August 1823) was a French balloonist and the inventor of the frameless parachute. He was appointed Official Aeronaut of France.

== Biography ==
André-Jacques Garnerin was born in Paris. During the first phase of the French Revolutionary Wars (1792–1797), he was captured by British troops. Subsequently, he was turned over to the Austrians and held as a prisoner of war in Buda, Hungary, for three years.

== Balloons and parachutes ==
=== Ballooning ===
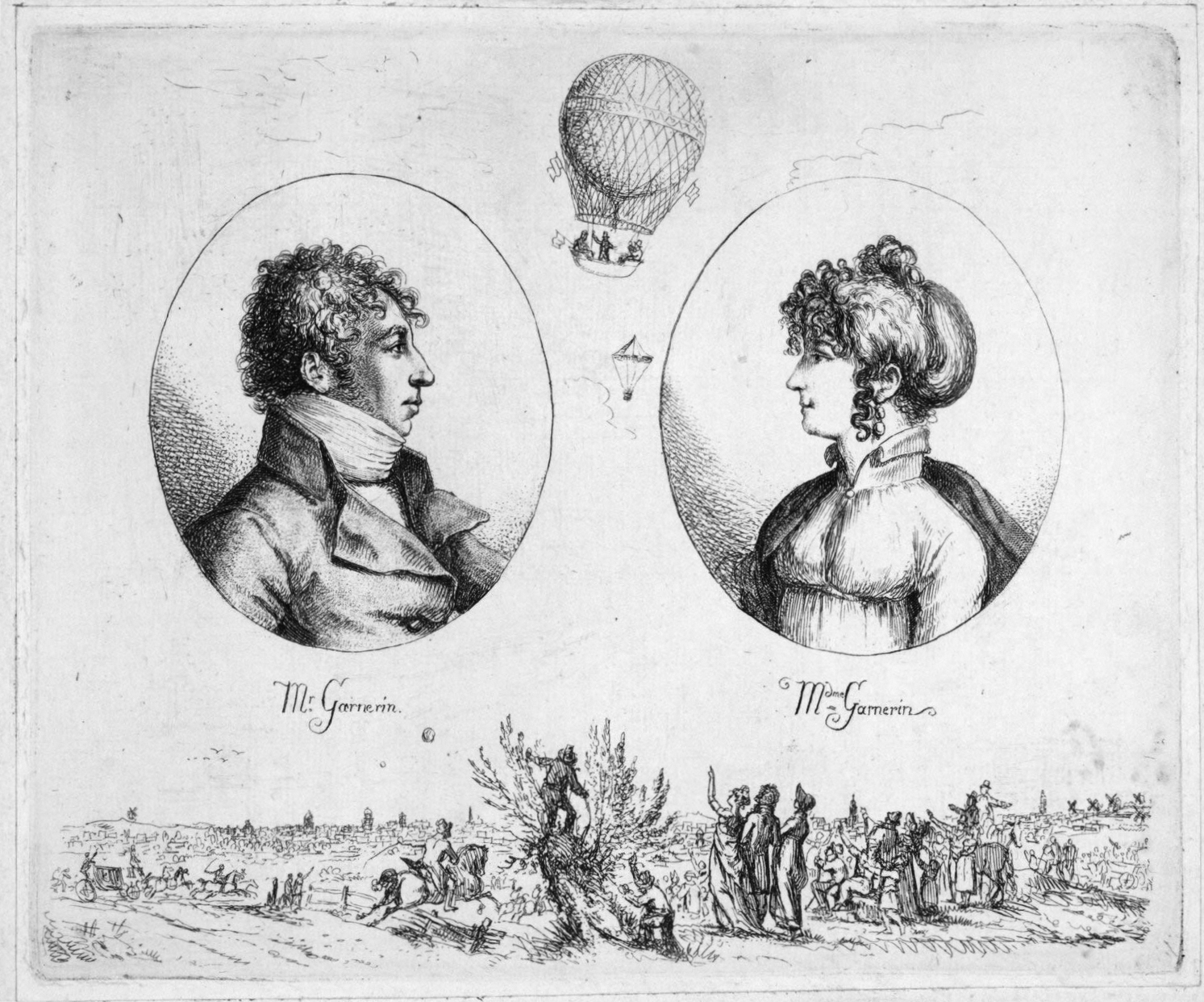
Monsieur and Madame Garnerin (Christoph Haller von Hallerstein, c. 1803)

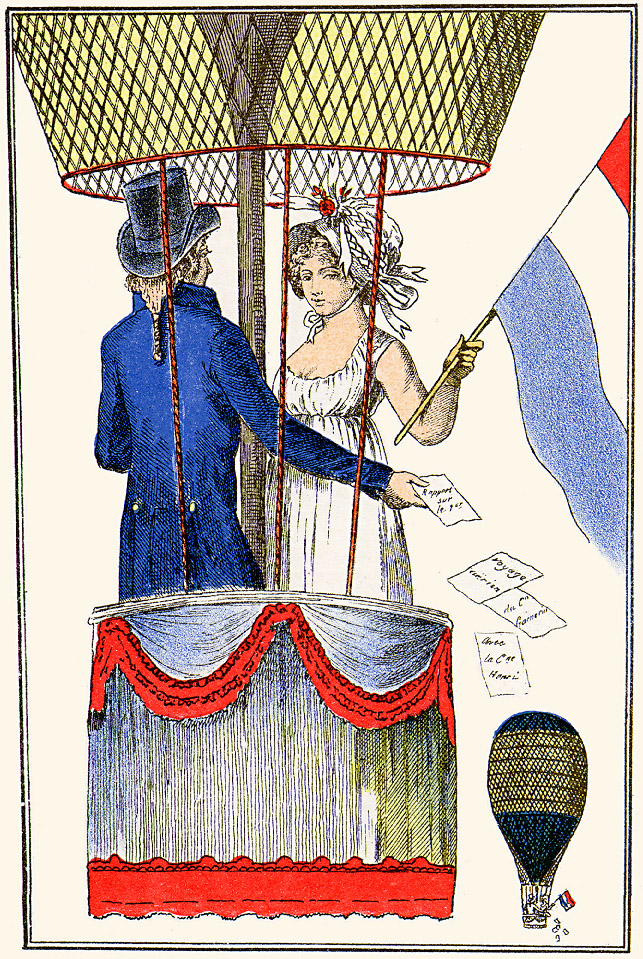
Citoyenne Henri accompanies Garnerin on a highly publicised and controversial flight on 8 July 1798

André-Jacques Garnerin was a student of the ballooning pioneer Professor Jacques Charles. Garnerin was heavily involved in the flight of hydrogen balloons, and worked with his older brother, Jean-Baptiste-Olivier Garnerin (1766–1849) in most of his ballooning activities. His significant contributions to ballooning and his expertise led to his appointment as the Official Aeronaut of France.

Garnerin began experiments with early parachutes based on umbrella-shaped devices and carried out the first frameless parachute descent (in the gondola) with a silk parachute on 22 October 1797 at Parc Monceau, Paris (1st Brumaire, Year VI of the Republican calendar). Garnerin's first parachute was made of white canvas with a diameter of approximately 23 feet (7 m). The umbrella was closed before he ascended, with a pole running down its centre and a rope running through a tube in the pole, which connected it to the balloon.

Garnerin rode in a basket attached to the bottom of the parachute; at a height of approximately 3,000 feet (1,000 m) he severed the rope that connected his parachute to the balloon. The balloon continued skyward while Garnerin, with his basket and parachute, fell. The basket swung violently during descent, (Note: In 1804 Jérôme Lalande introduced a vent in the canopy to eliminate violent oscillations.) then bumped and scraped when it landed, but Garnerin emerged uninjured.

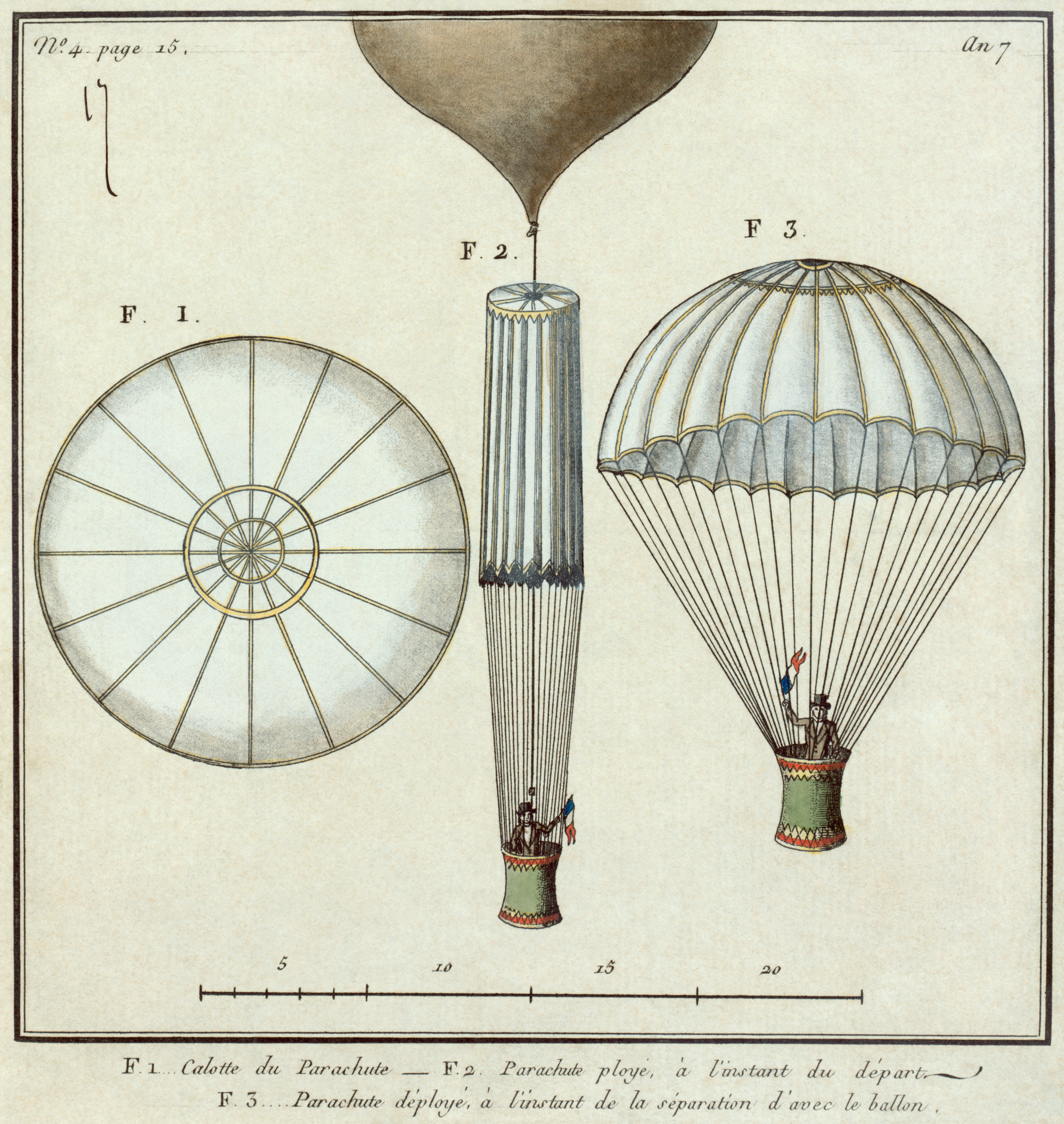
Schematic depiction of Garnerin's first parachute used in the Parc Monceau descent of 22 October 1797. Illustration dates from the early nineteenth century.

Parachute of André-Jacques Garnerin

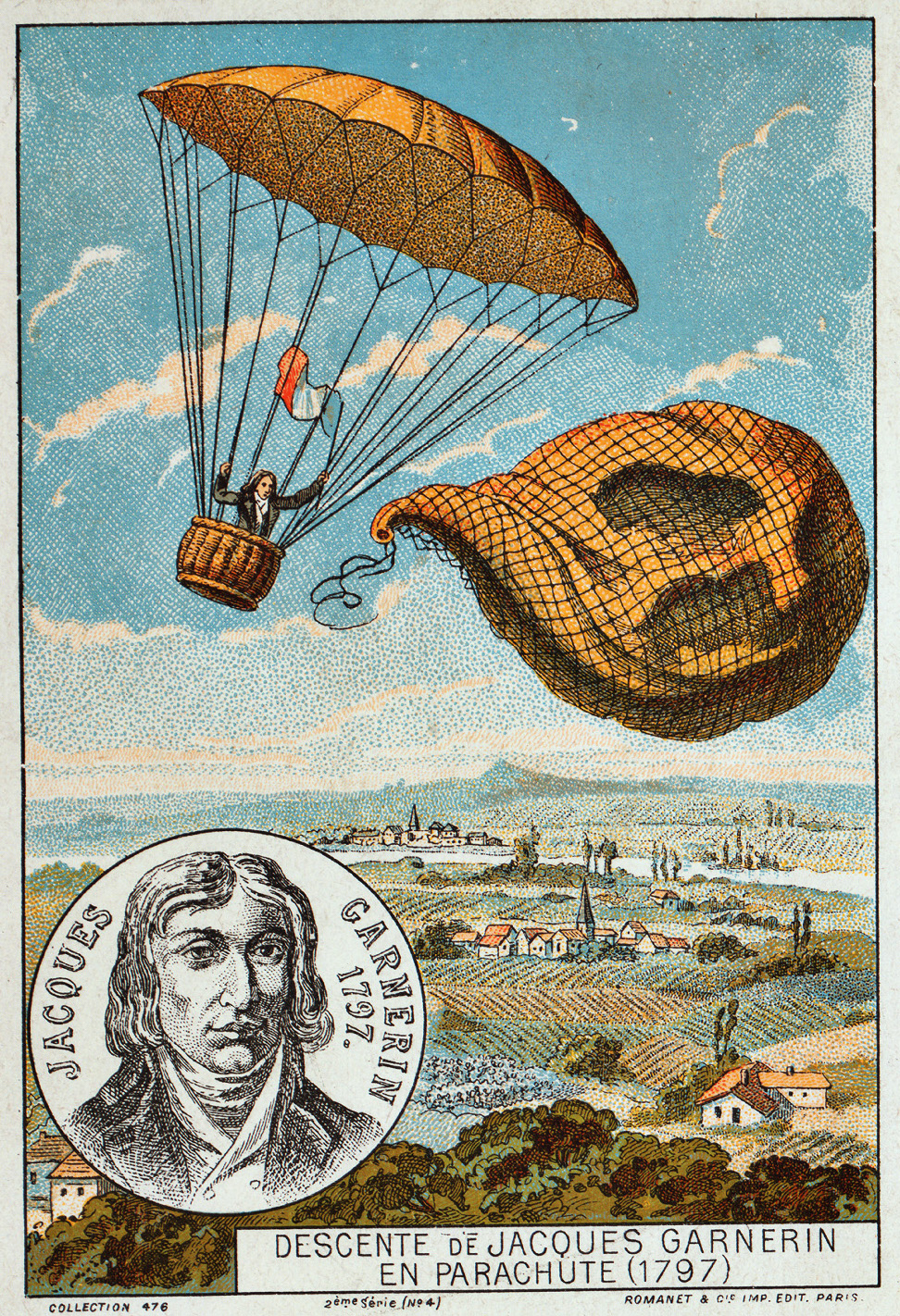
Garnerin releases the balloon and descends with the help of a parachute, 1797. Illustration from the late 19th century.

Garnerin went on to stage regular tests and demonstration of his parachute at Parc Monceau, Paris. On 22 October 1797, his parachute descent became a cause célèbre, particularly when he announced in 1798 that his next flight would include a woman as a passenger. Although the public and press were in favour, Garnerin was forced to justify his project before the officials of the Central Bureau of Police.

They were concerned about the effect that reduced air pressure might have on the organs of the delicate female body and loss of consciousness, plus the moral implications of flying in such close proximity. Unsatisfied with Garnerin's responses, the police issued an injunction against him, forbidding the ascent on the grounds that the young woman was committing herself to the venture without fully understanding the possible outcomes.

After further consultation with both the Minister of the Interior and the Minister of the Police the injunction was overturned on the grounds that "there was no more scandal in seeing two people of different gender ascend in a balloon than it is to see them jump into a carriage." They also agreed that the decision of the woman showed proof of her confidence in the experiment and a degree of personal intrepidity.

Citoyenne Henri had already been chosen, so when the ban was lifted Garnerin was ready to proceed. He advertised the ascent in L'Ami des Lois (a Parisian newspaper published from 1795 to 1798) :

The young Citoyenne who will accompany me is delighted to see the day approach for the journey. I shall ascend with her from the Parc Monceau, (Note: Parc Monceau is in the 8th arrondissement of Paris and is famed for Garnerin's public exploits. It was formerly known as "Parc de Mousseaux" and is referred to as such in many sources. (Mousseaux-sur-Seine is a small town approximately 70 kilometres from Paris.)) some time during the next ten days.

On 8 July 1798 a large number of spectators gathered in the Parc Monceau to witness the ascent. By all accounts Citoyenne Henri was young and beautiful, and she and Garnerin took several turns around the park to the applause of the crowd before she was assisted into the basket of the balloon by the astronomer Jérôme Lalande. The balloon trip passed without incident and the journey ended at Goussainville about 30 kilometres (19 mi) to the north of Paris.

== Touring England ==
Garnerin held the position of Official Aeronaut of France, and with his wife Jeanne Geneviève he visited England in 1802 during the Peace of Amiens and completed several demonstration flights. On 28th June, 1802, accompanied by Captain R C Sowden, he travelled from Ranelagh Gardens to Colchester, a distance of around 60 miles (96.5 km), in 45 minutes. A report in the press noted "it is, we believe, the first time so great a space was crossed in so short a period. Unfortunately by the violence of the wind the balloon has been destroyed." On 5 July 1802, accompanied by the artist Edward Hawke Locker, he ascended from Lords Cricket Ground and travelled 17 miiles (27.4 km) to Chingford in just over 15 minutes. He carried with him a letter of introduction signed by the Prince Regent to allay any suspicion when he landed.

On the evening of 21 September 1802, he ascended in his hydrogen balloon from the Volunteer Ground in North Audley Street, Grosvenor Square and then made a parachute descent to a field near St Pancras. It was the first parachute descent ever made in England and was widely celebrated:

Bold Garnerin went up
Which increased his Repute
And came safe to earth
In his Grand Parachute.

During his stay in England, Garnerin became embroiled in a lengthy and unpleasant war of words conducted in the English press concerning his activities during the French Revolution. He was variously accused of being involved in the trial of Marie Antoinette, the murder of the Princess de Lamballe and, during the time of the Terror, of being an agent of the infamous Committee of Public Safety. Needless to say, Garnerin denied the charges - but made no mention of his brother's activities at that time (see below).

Upon the collapse of The Peace of Amiens, Garnerin returned to France where, on 3–4 October 1803, he covered a distance of 245 miles (395 km) between Paris and Clausen, Germany.

== Family ==
=== Jean-Baptiste-Olivier Garnerin ===
Unlike his brother, Jean-Baptiste-Olivier Garnerin was called as a witness at the trial of Marie Antoinette. He provided damning testimony that while searching the papers of one M. Septeuil he had discovered "a check [sic] for eighty thousand livres, signed Antoinette, to the profit of ci-devant Polignac... [and] another paper proving that the Prisoner [Marie Antoinette] had sold her diamonds to send their produce to the Emigrants." The papers were passed on to the Committee of Public Safety.

He later went on to make improvements in the design of his brother's parachutes, notably by reducing their weight and increasing their strength. He also made improvements to equipment for producing gas, and invented a flotation device which enabled his daughter, Élisa, to parachute into the sea near Venice.

=== Jeanne Garnerin ===
His student Jeanne Geneviève Labrosse, who later became his wife, first flew on 10 November 1798, one of the earliest women to fly in a balloon, and on 12 October 1799, she became the first woman to make a parachute descent, from an altitude of 900 meters.

=== Élisa Garnerin ===
His paternal niece Élisa Garnerin, (born 1791), learned to fly balloons at age 15 and made her first parachute descent in front of the King of Prussia in 1815. She made 39 professional parachute descents between 1815 and 1836 in Italy, Spain, Russia, Germany, and France. (Note: Élisa Garnerin was especially popular in Italy, where she was hailed as the "Prima Aeroporista" (or First Parachutist) of France when she made her twenty-second and twenty-third descents in Milan (5 March and 5 April 1824). The crowds were delighted when she waved both French and Italian flags from the basket.)

== Death ==
On 18 August, 1823, at the age of 54, Garnerin was working on the construction of a new balloon. While walking around the construction site he was struck by a falling beam which killed him instantly.

== Legacy ==
Garnerin's first parachute jump was commemorated by Google in a Google Doodle on 22 October 2013.
