= Clement Oak =

White oak tree in New Jersey, U.S.

Coordinates: 39°50′41″N 75°5′25″W

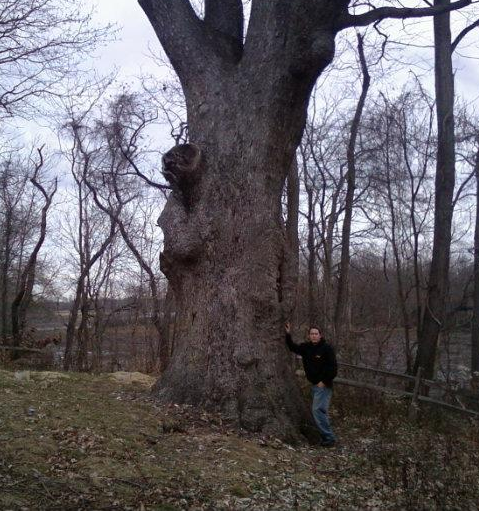
The Clement Oak; before its destruction

The Clement Oak is a large old white oak tree in Deptford Township, New Jersey. It is believed to have sprouted between 1555 and 1615. Much of the tree was downed by a storm in 2020, but a lower limb survived the collapse of the rest of the tree and remains alive, with leaves, as of 2026.

The Clement Oak is located behind the Deptford Walmart, near Big Timber Creek, on land that once belonged to the Clement family. The original plans for construction of the Walmart called for the tree to be felled, but Walmart was persuaded to alter their plan so the tree could be spared.

The girth of the tree (2011) at 4.5 feet (1.4 m) was 20 feet (6.1 m). The estimated height was 90 feet (27 m) with an overall spread of over 100 feet (30 m).

The Clement Oak is said to have been known to the aboriginal Lenape, and to have been noticed by the first European settlers, as it served as a reference point in early land surveys. According to unsubstantiated local lore, native pow wows were held there, and a treaty between settlers and the Lenape was signed beneath its branches. The Gloucester County Historical Society honored the Clement Oak during New Jersey's 300 year anniversary celebration in 1964.

The Clement Oak was the site of the landing of the first aerial flight in the New World, a 1793 balloon flight. On January 9, 1793, Jean-Pierre Blanchard took off from the prison yard of the Walnut Street Jail in Philadelphia and landed in Deptford at the Clement Oak. This was a major public event in the country at the time, and Blanchard's take off was attended by several notable figures including then President George Washington and future presidents John Adams, Thomas Jefferson, James Madison, and James Monroe. During his flight, Blanchard carried a personal letter from George Washington to be delivered to the owner of whatever property Blanchard happened to land on, which if true would have made the flight the first delivery of air mail in the United States as well. The letter is also said to have included a directive that all U.S. citizens were requested to assist him to return to Philadelphia (Blanchard did not speak English), which if true would make it the first known use of a blood chit for an airman.

A plaque was placed at the tree to commemorate the balloon flight. A second plaque was placed to commemorate the tree itself, reading "The Clement Oak, which sheltered Lenape hunters 4 centuries ago, and early colonists 3 centuries ago, and children at play in later years, is dedicated during the tercentenary of New Jersey, as symbolic of the state's continuing growth – Gloucester County Historical Society July 1964".

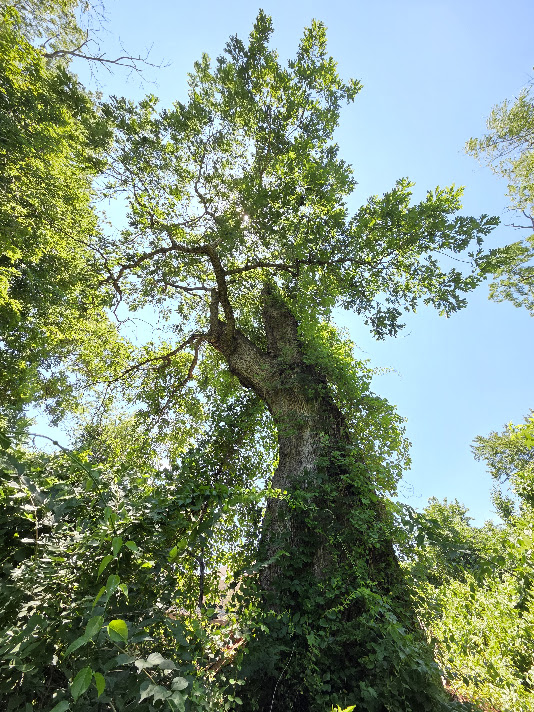
The surviving lower limb of the Clement Oak. June 2026.

In June 2020, most of the tree canopy collapsed, having been ripped apart by a wind storm/stuck by lighting leaving only a stump a few meters tall, and one remaining limb with branches. In 2021, an offspring of the tree was planted in UCNJ’s Historic Tree Grove from a seed collected in years prior to the tree's 2020 collapse.

There was considerable public outcry in 2025 over the site falling into ruin and being overtaken by bushes, vines, and weeds. In response to this, Deptford Township worked with Walmart to clean up and restore the site, recognizing that the tree was in fact still alive. As of 2026, the weeds and vines that were growing on the ground in front of the tree have been cleared away and replaced by a mat of large, round white stones. Additionally, a mulch bed has been installed along the fence separating the tree from the Walmart parking lot. Vines have also been removed from the plaque of the tree, although the plaque commemorating Blanchard's 1793 balloon flight has fully faded away.

The remaining limb of the Clement Oak reaches 37 feet in height, and is 35 feet in spread. The remaining stump of the tree has collapsed on the side opposite of the surviving limb, but grew to be 21 feet in circumference. While the overall condition of the tree is poor, the remaining limb of the tree continues to make the Clement Oak a part of the living history and natural heritage of both Deptford Township and New Jersey as a whole.

Clement Oak
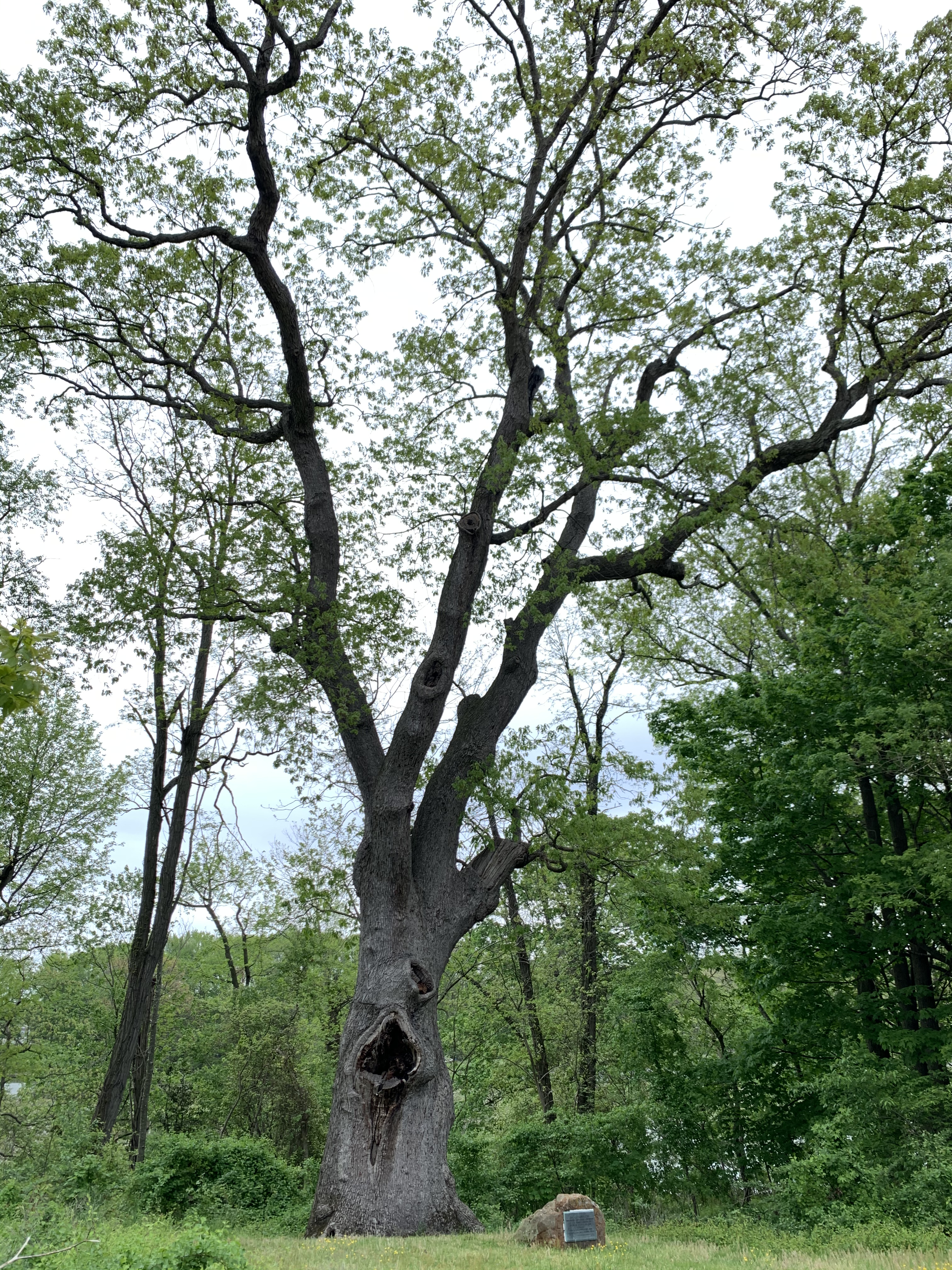
Clement Oak as of May 5, 2020

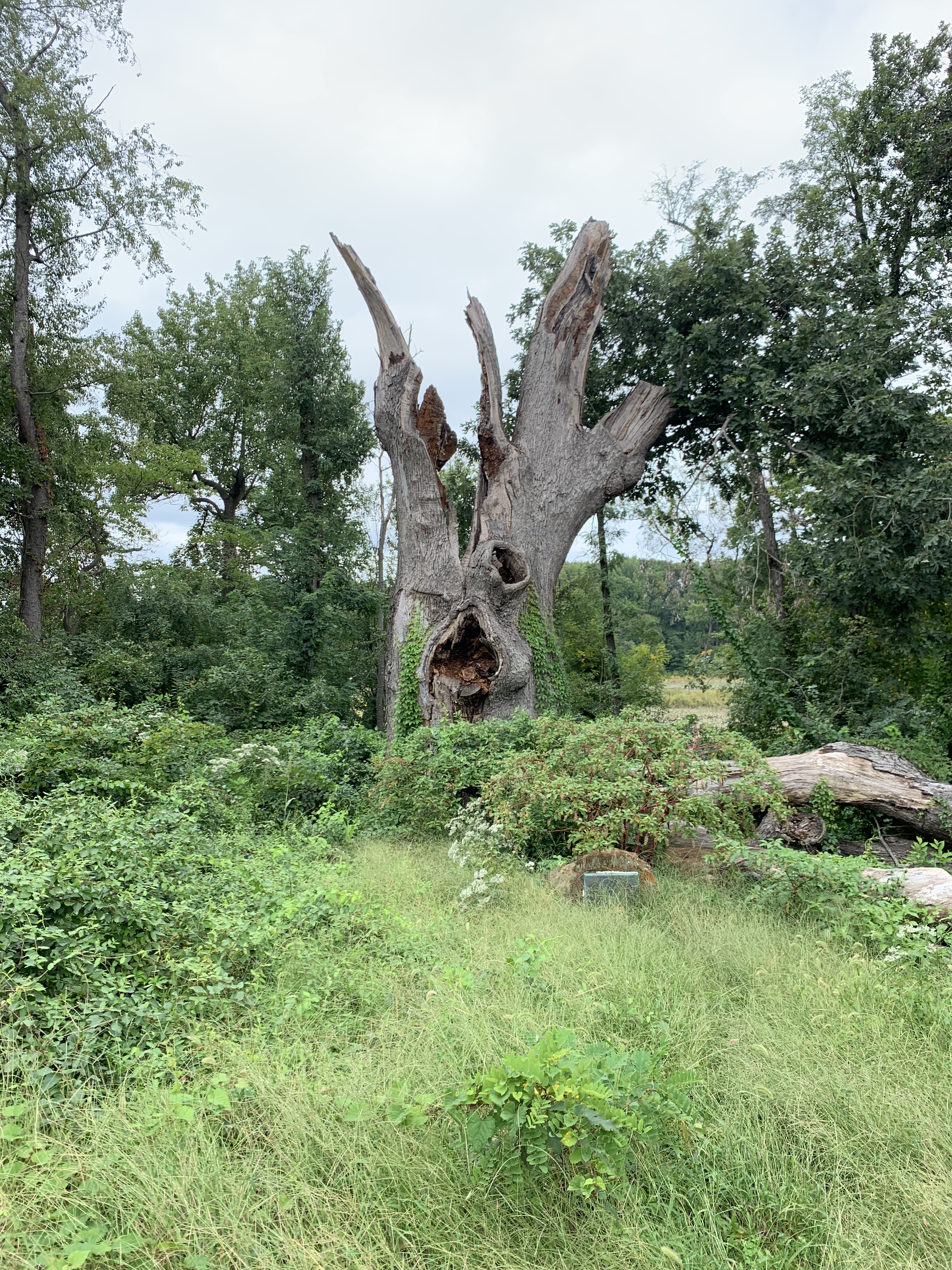
Remnant stump of the Clement Oak as of September 16, 2021

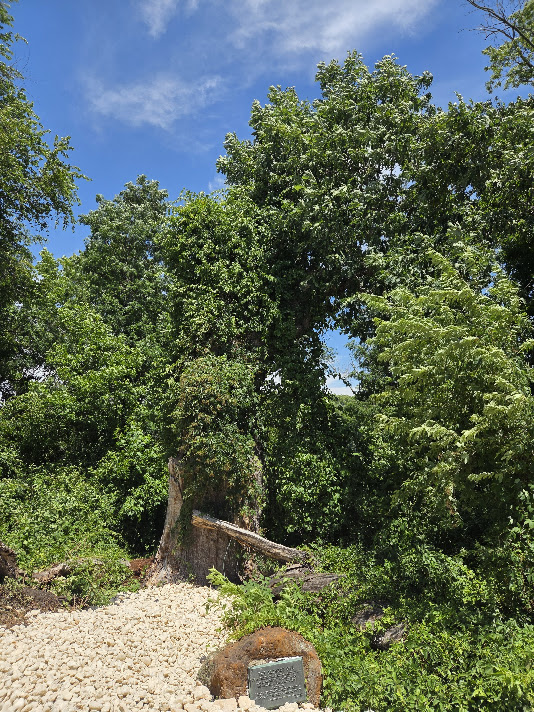
Remnant stump of the Clement Oak as of June 18, 2026, after site restoration

== See also ==
- List of individual trees
- Salem Oak
