= Morale patch =

Military insignia designed to inspire humor

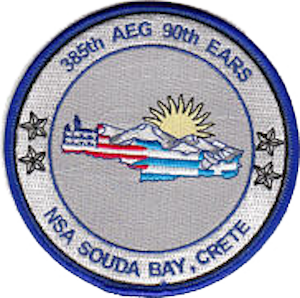
Squadron morale patch used at Souda Bay

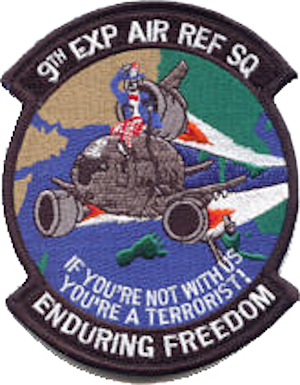
9 EARS morale patch

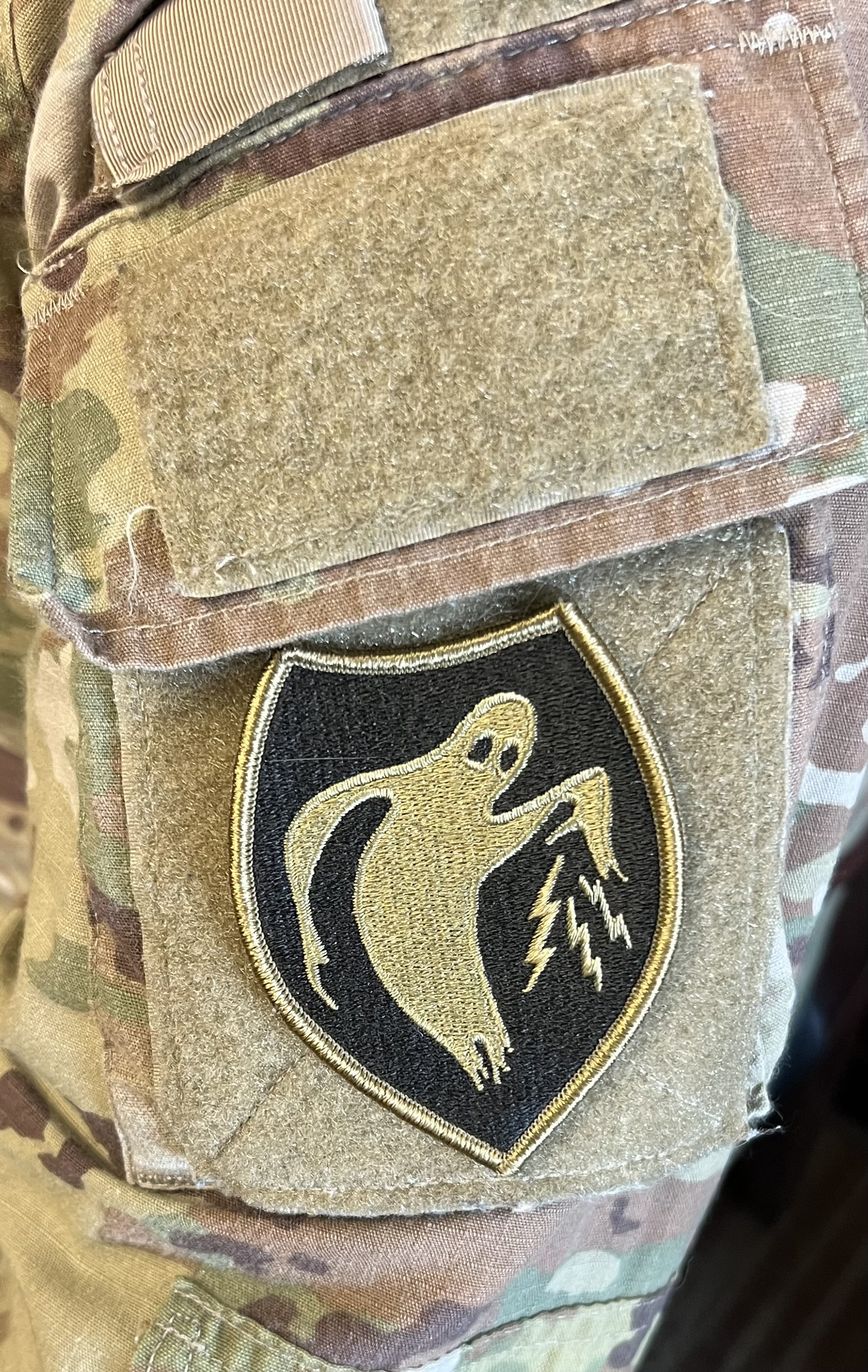
56th TIOG morale patch

A morale patch is a military ornamental insignia with humorous images and expressions. They can be used as identification with a particular unit, such as a division or brigade, and are designed to build an esprit de corps with military personnel. The morale patch is usually not authorized directly by the military to be worn on an official uniform but can often be found on military clothing or gear.

== History ==
Morale patches are a part of military history and have cultural significance for soldiers and law enforcement personnel. The morale patch's roots can be traced to the British Army, before World War I, who called them "battle patches". Mainly used to identify allies and enemy units, the distinctive designs would identify personnel as belonging to certain military units.

In the 1920s, the patches became unique and individualized and experienced widespread popularity. They became collectible and tradable items. This brought civilians closer to military personnel and made law enforcement agents more approachable.

The 81st Division Wildcats of the U.S. Army created the first American morale patch during World War I. It was suggested to Army officials that a patch should be created to acknowledge a division. The insignia was approved to help the morale of the troops, and soon after that, General Pershing suggested all divisions to create and wear a patch—something unique to their division.

== Trademark lawsuits ==
On August 31, 2020, a lawsuit was filed against 281 defendants for the use of the words "morale patch" as case number 20cv04776 in the Northern District of Illinois court. In 2016, Morale Patch Armory LLC trademarked the term "MORALE PATCH" for commercial use and filed a claim of trademark infringement. The lawsuit focused mainly on veteran-owned companies, tactical gear manufacturers, and small, internet-based operations. Morale Patch Armory LLC is owned by Julio Medina, who is an Air Force veteran.

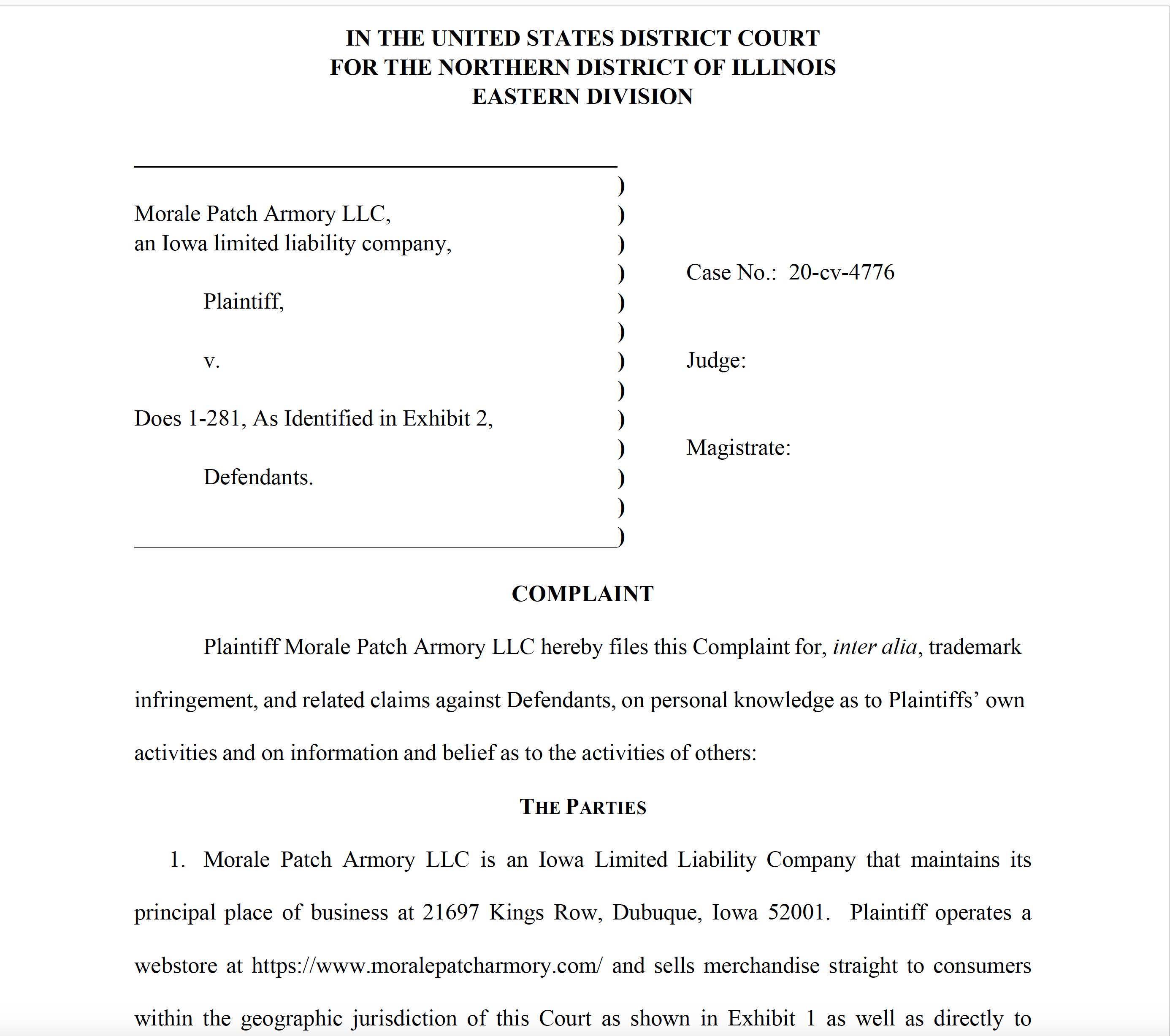

On September 10, 2020, Prometheus Design Werx filed a petition to cancel the trademark "MORALE PATCH".

On September 16, 2020, The Military Times published an article explaining the details of the lawsuit.

On August 18, 2022, the Trademark Trial and Appeal Board canceled the trademark.

== See also ==
- Blood chit
