= Deptford Township, New Jersey =

Township in Gloucester County, New Jersey, US

- Township
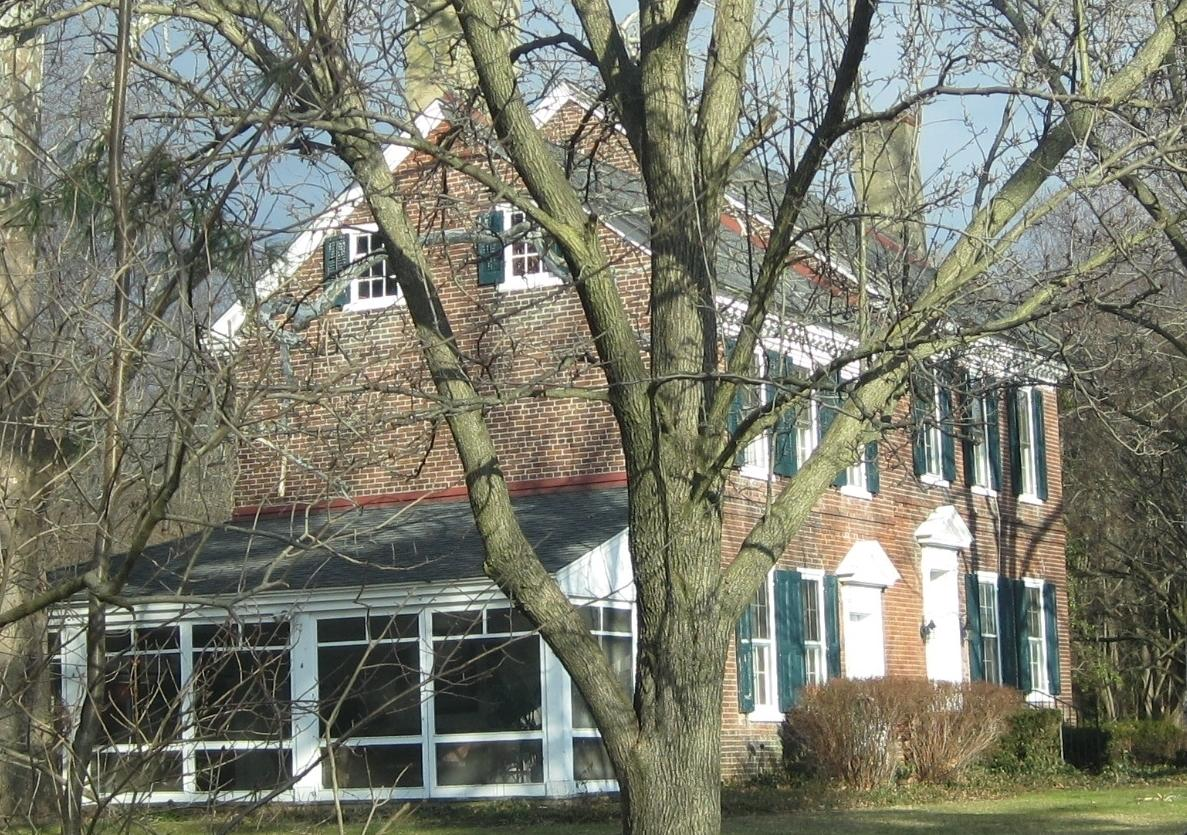
- Benjamin Clark House, built in 1769, in Deptford Township, January 2010

- Seal
- Nickname: "First Flight in America"
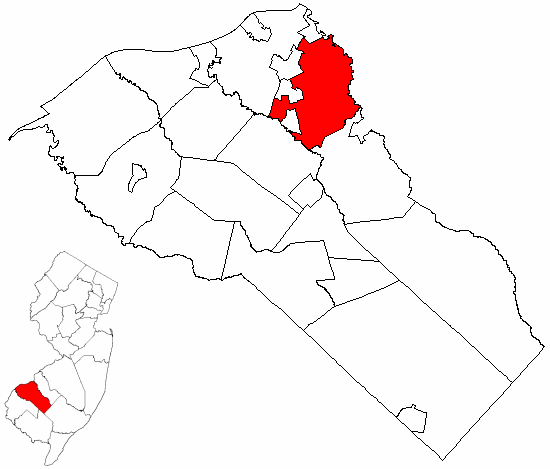
- Location of Deptford Township in Gloucester County highlighted in red (right). Inset map: Location of Gloucester County in New Jersey highlighted in red (left).

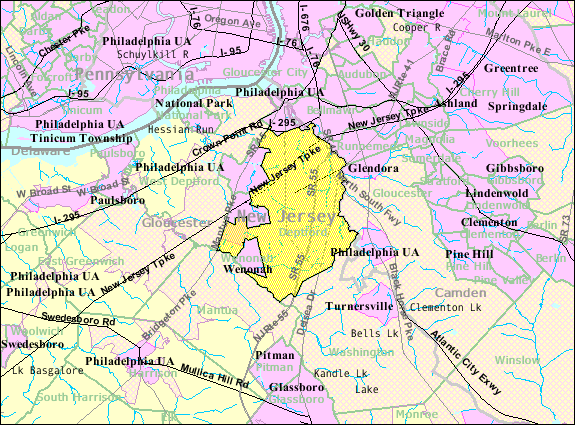
- Census Bureau map of Deptford Township, New Jersey

- Location in Gloucester County Location in New Jersey Location in the United States
- Coordinates: 39.813794°N 75.118693°W
- Country: United States
- State: New Jersey
- County: Gloucester
- Formed: June 1, 1695 as Bethlehem
- Incorporated: February 21, 1798
- Named after: Deptford, England

Government
  - Type: Faulkner Act Council-Manager
  - Body: Township Council
  - Mayor: Paul Medany (D, term ends December 31, 2026)
  - Manager: Thomas Newman Jr.
  - Municipal clerk: Michelle Hack

Area
  - Total: 17.57 sq mi (45.50 km^{2})
  - Land: 17.33 sq mi (44.89 km^{2})
  - Water: 0.24 sq mi (0.61 km^{2}) 1.35%
  - Rank: 163rd of 565 in state 9th of 24 in county
- Elevation: 59 ft (18 m)

Population (2020)
  - Total: 31,977
  - Estimate (2023): 32,313
  - Rank: 72nd of 565 in state 3rd of 24 in county
  - Density: 1,845.1/sq mi (712.4/km^{2})
  - Rank: 305th of 565 in state 11th of 24 in county
- Time zone: UTC−05:00 (Eastern (EST))
  - Summer (DST): UTC−04:00 (Eastern (EDT))
- ZIP Codes: 08096
- Area code: 856
- FIPS code: 3401517710
- GNIS feature ID: 0882149
- Website: www.deptford-nj.org

Deptford Township (/dɛpfərd/; DEP-fərd) is a township in Gloucester County in the U.S. state of New Jersey. As of the 2020 United States census, the township's population was 31,977, an increase of 1,416 (+4.6%) from the 2010 census count of 30,561, which in turn reflected an increase of 3,798 (+14.2%) from the 26,763 counted in the 2000 census.

Deptford Township was formed June 1, 1695, and was known initially as Bethlehem. It was incorporated as a township by the New Jersey Legislature on February 21, 1798, as one of the state's initial 104 townships formed under the Township Act. Since then, portions of the township were taken to create Washington Township (February 17, 1836), Woodbury Borough (March 27, 1854; now Woodbury), West Deptford Township (March 1, 1871), Wenonah (March 10, 1883), Westville (April 7, 1914), and Woodbury Heights (April 6, 1915).

Deptford is a southeastern suburb of Philadelphia, located on the eastern side of the Walt Whitman Bridge, one of several bridges that join South Jersey with Philadelphia, the nation's sixth-largest city as of 2020. It is located 10 miles (16 km) southeast of Philadelphia and 50 miles (80 km) northwest of Atlantic City.

Deptford Township was named for the Deptford area of London, located on the River Thames. It is part of the South Jersey region of the state.

== History ==
Dutch explorer Cornelius Jacobsen May led some of the earliest European settlement in the area. May was followed by settlers from Sweden and Finland before the area ultimately came under British colonial rule. The township was formed in 1695, and covered an area of 106 square miles (270 km^{2}) that included today's Deptford Township along with present-day Monroe Township, Washington Township, West Deptford Township, Westville, Woodbury, and Woodbury Heights.

Clement Oak in Deptford, an old oak tree estimated to have sprouted between 1555 and 1615, was the site of the first hot air balloon landing in North America when Jean-Pierre Blanchard completed his flight to Deptford from Philadelphia in 1793. During his flight, Blanchard carried a personal letter from George Washington to be delivered to the owner of whatever property Blanchard landed on, making the flight the first airmail delivery in the nation.

On September 1, 2021, Deptford Township was hit by a strong EF3 tornado with winds up to 150 miles per hour (240 km/h) produced by the remnants of Hurricane Ida. More than 100 homes in the township were damaged in the tornado outbreak.

== Geography ==
According to the U.S. Census Bureau, the township had a total area of 17.57 square miles (45.50 km^{2}), including 17.33 square miles (44.89 km^{2}) of land and 0.24 square miles (0.61 km^{2}) of water (1.35%). The township borders Mantua Township, Washington Township, Wenonah, West Deptford Township, Westville, Woodbury, and Woodbury Heights in Gloucester County, and Bellmawr, Gloucester Township, and Runnemede in Camden County.

Oak Valley, with a 2020 census population of 3,497, is an unincorporated community and census-designated place (CDP) located in Deptford Township. Other unincorporated communities, localities, and places located partially or completely within the township include Almonesson, Blackwood Terrace, Clements Bridge, Cooper Village, Country Club Estates, Good Intent, Hammond Heights, Jericho, Lake Tract, New Sharon, Oak Valley, Salina, Westcottville, Westville Grove, Woodbury Gardens, Woodbury Park, and Woodbury Terrace.

== Demographics ==
Historical population
Census	Pop.	Note	%±
1800	2,510		—
1810	2,978		18.6%
1820	3,281		10.2%
1830	3,599		9.7%
1840	2,570	*	−28.6%
1850	3,355		30.5%
1860	4,213	*	25.6%
1870	2,698		−36.0%
1880	1,520	*	−43.7%
1890	1,681	*	10.6%
1900	2,114		25.8%
1910	2,524		19.4%
1920	2,224	*	−11.9%
1930	4,507		102.7%
1940	4,738		5.1%
1950	7,304		54.2%
1960	17,878		144.8%
1970	24,232		35.5%
1980	23,473		−3.1%
1990	24,137		2.8%
2000	26,763		10.9%
2010	30,561		14.2%
2020	31,977		4.6%
2023 (est.)	32,313		1.1%
Population sources: 1800–2000; 1800–1920 1840 1850–1870; 1850 1870 1880–1890; 1890–1910 1910–1930; 1940–2000 2000; 2010 2020 * = Lost territory in previous decade.

=== 2010 census ===
The 2010 United States census counted 30,561 people, 11,689 households, and 7,995 families in the township. The population density was 1,760.3 per square mile (679.7/km^{2}). There were 12,361 housing units at an average density of 712.0 per square mile (274.9/km^{2}). The racial makeup was 78.80% (24,082) White, 12.16% (3,717) Black or African American, 0.24% (73) Native American, 4.45% (1,361) Asian, 0.04% (12) Pacific Islander, 2.04% (622) from other races, and 2.27% (694) from two or more races. Hispanic or Latino of any race were 5.99% (1,830) of the population.

Of the 11,689 households, 27.8% had children under the age of 18; 50.1% were married couples living together; 12.9% had a female householder with no husband present and 31.6% were non-families. Of all households, 25.3% were made up of individuals and 10.0% had someone living alone who was 65 years of age or older. The average household size was 2.58 and the average family size was 3.11.

21.6% of the population were under the age of 18, 8.4% from 18 to 24, 27.2% from 25 to 44, 27.7% from 45 to 64, and 15.0% who were 65 years of age or older. The median age was 39.8 years. For every 100 females, the population had 92.8 males. For every 100 females ages 18 and older there were 90.0 males.

The Census Bureau's 2006–2010 American Community Survey showed that, in 2010 inflation-adjusted dollars, median household income was $66,833 with a margin of error of +/− $2,897 and median family income was $76,303 (+/− $2,216). Males had a median income of $52,310 (+/− $2,247) versus $46,532 (+/− $4,525) for females. The per capita income for the township was $30,476 (+/− $1,269). About 6.9% of families and 8.6% of the population were below the poverty line, including 13.7% of those under age 18 and 10.3% of those age 65 or over.

=== 2000 census ===
As of the 2000 U.S. census, there were 26,763 people, 10,013 households, and 7,079 families residing in the township. The population density was 1,529.7 inhabitants per square mile (590.6/km^{2}). There were 10,647 housing units at an average density of 608.6 per square mile (235.0/km^{2}). The racial makeup of the township was 83.44% White, 12.38% Black, 0.21% Native American, 1.53% Asian, 0.03% Pacific Islander, 0.99% from other races, and 1.41% from two or more races. Hispanic or Latino of any race were 2.86% of the population.

There were 10,013 households, out of which 31.6% had children under the age of 18 living with them, 53.9% were married couples living together, 11.9% had a female householder with no husband present, and 29.3% were non-families. 24.3% of all households were made up of individuals, and 9.3% had someone living alone who was 65 years of age or older. The average household size was 2.62 and the average family size was 3.12.

In the township, the age distribution of the population showed 23.8% under the age of 18, 7.4% from 18 to 24, 32.2% from 25 to 44, 21.6% from 45 to 64, and 15.0% who were 65 years of age or older. The median age was 37 years. For every 100 females, there were 93.2 males. For every 100 females age 18 and over, there were 90.2 males.

The median income for a household in the township was $50,147, and the median income for a family was $56,642. Males had a median income of $40,641 versus $28,986 for females. The per capita income for the township was $21,477. 5.9% of the population and 4.3% of families were below the poverty line. Out of the total population, 6.2% of those under the age of 18 and 8.1% of those 65 and older were living below the poverty line.

== Economy ==
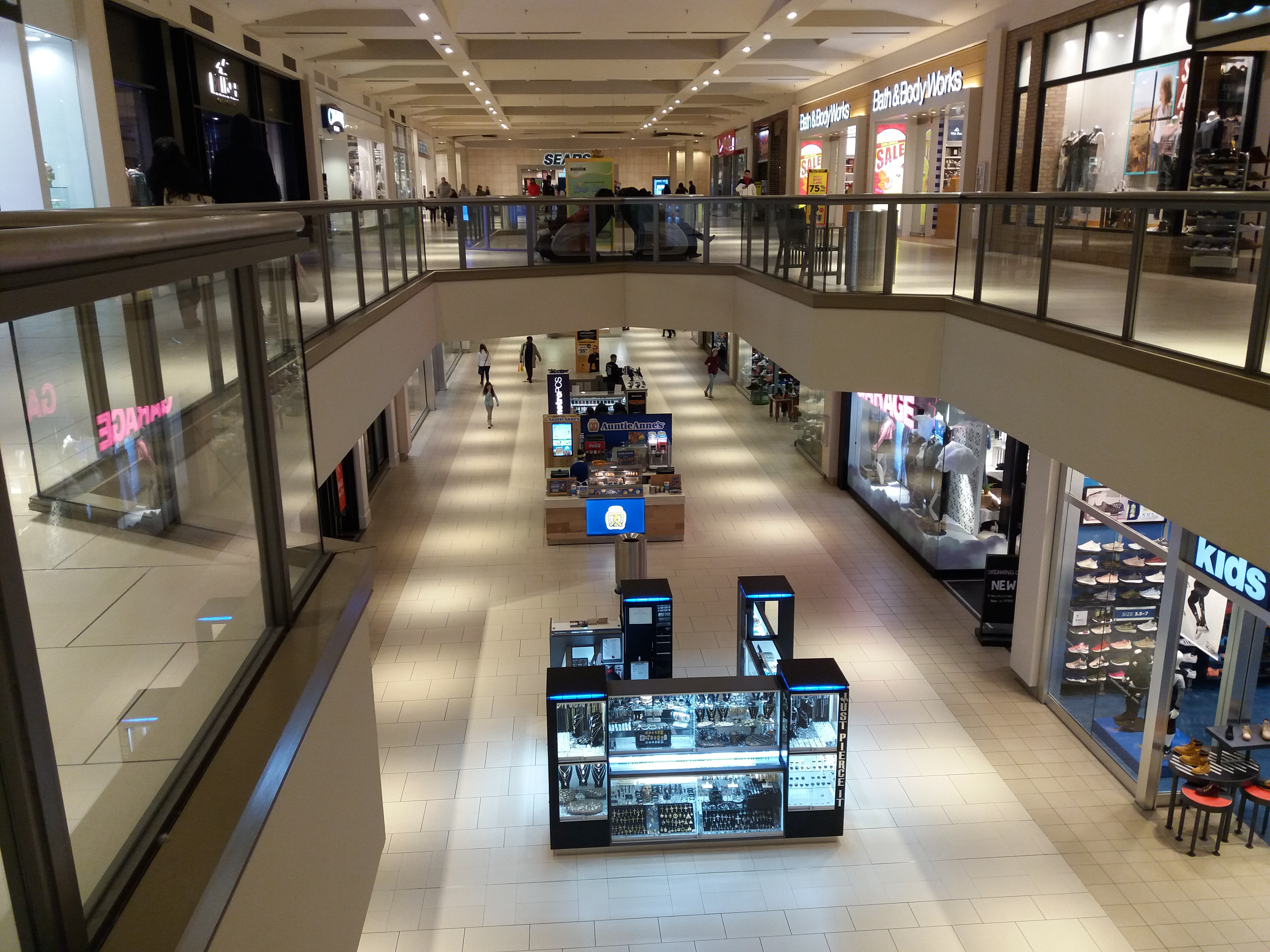
Deptford Mall in Deptford Township

Deptford Mall, the largest mall in the South Jersey region of the state with a gross leasable area of 1,069,657 square feet (99,374.4 m^{2}), is located in the township. Macerich purchased the mall in 2007 for $241 million. The mall is surrounded by an eight-screen movie theater, twelve strip malls, bars, restaurants, and stores.

== Parks and recreation ==
Tall Pines State Preserve is a 111-acre (45 ha) nature preserve that is Gloucester County's first state park. Opened in November 2015, the park is located on Deptford Township's border with Mantua Township. Originally a forest that was turned into an asparagus field and then a golf course, the land was preserved through efforts of the South Jersey Land and Water Trust, the Friends of Tall Pines, Gloucester County Nature Club, and the New Jersey Green Acres Program.

== Government ==
=== Local government ===
Deptford Township operates under the Faulkner Act, formally known as the Optional Municipal Charter Law, under the Council-Manager form of municipal government. The township is one of 42 (of the 564) municipalities in New Jersey that uses this form of government. The governing body comprises a seven-member Township Council, whose members are elected on an at-large basis in partisan elections to serve four-year terms of office on a staggered basis, with either three or four seats coming up for election in odd-numbered years. The council then selects a mayor and a deputy mayor to serve two-year terms from among its members during the reorganization meeting in January. There are no term limits for council, mayor or deputy mayor, and elected officials can remain in those offices as long as they continue to be nominated by the council every two years and as long as they win their council elections every four years. The council hires an independent manager to serve as the chief administrative official of the township. The Township Manager is Thomas Newman Jr.

As of 2025, members of the Deptford Township Council are Mayor Paul Medany (D, term on committee ends December 31, 2027; term as mayor ends 2025), Deputy Mayor Tom Hufnell (D, term on committee ends 2027; term as deputy mayor ends 2025), Kenneth Barnshaw (D, 2025), Bill Lamb (D, 2025), Brandi Leidy (D, 2027), Wayne Love (D, 2025) and Phillip Schocklin (D, 2025).

=== Federal, state, and county representation ===
Deptford Township is located in New Jersey's 1st congressional district and is part of New Jersey's 5th state legislative district.

For the 119th United States Congress, New Jersey's 1st congressional district is represented by Donald Norcross (D, Camden). New Jersey is represented in the United States Senate by Democrats Cory Booker (Newark, term ends 2027) and Andy Kim (Moorestown, term ends 2031).

For the 2026–2027 session, the 5th legislative district of the New Jersey Legislature is represented in the State Senate by Nilsa Cruz-Perez (D, Barrington) and in the General Assembly by Bill Moen (D, Camden) and William Spearman (D, Camden).

Gloucester County is governed by a board of county commissioners, whose seven members are elected at-large to three-year terms of office on a staggered basis in partisan elections, with either two or three seats coming up for election each year. At a reorganization meeting held each January, the Board selects a Director and a Deputy Director from among its members. As of 2025, Gloucester County's Commissioners are:

Director Frank J. DiMarco (D, Deptford Township, 2025), Matt Weng (D, Pitman, 2026), Joann Gattinelli (D, Washington Township, 2026), Nicholas DeSilvio (R, Franklin Township, 2027), Denice DiCarlo (D, West Deptford Township, 2025) Deputy Director Jim Jefferson (D, Woodbury, 2026) and Christopher Konawel Jr. (R, Glassboro, 2027).

Gloucester County's constitutional officers are: Clerk James N. Hogan (D, Franklin Township; 2027), Sheriff Carmel Morina (D, Greenwich Township; 2027) and Surrogate Giuseppe "Joe" Chila (D, Woolwich Township; 2028).

=== Politics ===
United States presidential election results for Deptford Township 2024 2020 2016 2012 2008 2004
Year	Republican		Democratic		Third party(ies)	
Year	No.	%	No.	%	No.	%
2024	7,721	46.31%	8,659	51.93%	293	1.76%
2020	7,651	42.99%	9,886	55.54%	262	1.47%
2016	6,126	42.96%	7,642	53.59%	493	3.46%
2012	4,938	36.49%	8,427	62.27%	168	1.24%
2008	5,311	37.45%	8,655	61.03%	215	1.52%
2004	5,220	40.94%	7,426	58.24%	104	0.82%

As of March 2011, there was a total of 19,449 registered voters in Deptford. Among these, 8,169 (42.0%) were registered as Democrats, 2,740 (14.1%) were registered as Republicans, and 8,523 (43.8%) were registered as Unaffiliated. There were 17 voters registered as Libertarians or Greens.

In the 2012 presidential election, Democrat Barack Obama received 62.3% of the vote (8,427 cast), ahead of Republican Mitt Romney with 36.5% (4,938 votes), and other candidates with 1.2% (168 votes), among the 13,639 ballots cast by the township's 20,488 registered voters (106 ballots were spoiled), for a turnout of 66.6%. In the 2008 presidential election, Democrat Barack Obama received 60.4% of the vote (8,655 cast), ahead of Republican John McCain with 37.1% (5,311 votes) and other candidates with 1.5% (215 votes), among the 14,332 ballots cast by the township's 20,166 registered voters, for a turnout of 71.1%. In the 2004 presidential election, Democrat John Kerry received 58.0% of the vote (7,426 ballots cast), outpolling Republican George W. Bush with 40.8% (5,220 votes) and other candidates with 0.6% (104 votes), among the 12,806 ballots cast by the township's 17,725 registered voters, for a turnout percentage of 72.2.

Gubernatorial election results for Deptford Township
Year	Republican		Democratic		Third party(ies)	
Year	No.	%	No.	%	No.	%
2025	5,404	41.89%	7,398	57.35%	97	0.75%
2021	4,857	49.43%	4,892	49.79%	77	0.78%
2017	2,709	36.62%	4,489	60.69%	199	2.69%
2013	4,794	60.88%	2,969	37.71%	111	1.41%
2009	3,487	41.85%	4,158	49.90%	687	8.25%
2005	2,749	35.76%	4,643	60.40%	295	3.84%

In the 2013 gubernatorial election, Republican Chris Christie received 60.9% of the vote (4,794 cast), ahead of Democrat Barbara Buono with 37.7% (2,969 votes), and other candidates with 1.4% (111 votes), among the 8,093 ballots cast by the township's 20,145 registered voters (219 ballots were spoiled), for a turnout of 40.2%. In the 2009 gubernatorial election, Democrat Jon Corzine received 48.9% of the vote (4,158 ballots cast), ahead of Republican Chris Christie with 41.0% (3,487 votes), Independent Chris Daggett with 7.3% (622 votes) and other candidates with 0.8% (65 votes), among the 8,500 ballots cast by the township's 19,678 registered voters, yielding a 43.2% turnout.

United States Senate election results for Deptford Township1
Year	Republican		Democratic		Third party(ies)	
Year	No.	%	No.	%	No.	%
2024	6,891	43.09%	8,850	55.34%	251	1.57%
2018	4,658	42.85%	5,788	53.24%	425	3.91%
2012	4,202	32.59%	8,401	65.16%	290	2.25%
2006	2,846	38.15%	4,422	59.28%	192	2.57%

United States Senate election results for Deptford Township2
Year	Republican		Democratic		Third party(ies)	
Year	No.	%	No.	%	No.	%
2020	7,277	41.57%	9,862	56.34%	365	2.09%
2014	2,547	37.74%	4,057	60.12%	144	2.13%
2013	1,761	42.89%	2,275	55.41%	70	1.70%
2008	4,549	34.61%	8,267	62.90%	327	2.49%

== Education ==
=== Primary and secondary education ===
Public school students in the township are served by Deptford Township Schools, a public school district that includes eight schools for students in pre-kindergarten through twelfth grade. As of the 2020–21 school year, the district had an enrollment of 3,942 students and 329.8 classroom teachers on an FTE basis for a student–teacher ratio of 12.0:1. Schools in the district (with 2020–21 enrollment data from the National Center for Education Statistics,) are Central Early Childhood Center with 489 students in grades Pre-K–1, Pine Acres Early Childhood Center with 240 students in grades Kindergarten, Good Intent School with 334 students in grades 1-5, Lake Tract School with 382 students in grades 1-5, Oak Valley School with 354 students in grades 1-5, Shady Lane School with 361 students in grades 1-5, Monongahela Middle School with 704 students in grades 6–8, Deptford Township High School with 1,009 students in grades 9–12, and Deptford Transitional Learning Academy, which assists students with developmental or cognitive disabilities ages 14 to 21 learn life and career skills.

Gloucester County students are eligible to apply to attend Gloucester County Institute of Technology, a four-year high school in Deptford Township that provides technical and vocational education. As a public school, students do not pay tuition to attend the school.

Guardian Angels Regional School (PreK-Grade 3 campus in Gibbstown and 4–8 campus in Paulsboro), managed by the Roman Catholic Diocese of Camden, also accepts students from Deptford.

=== College ===
Gloucester County College, now part of Rowan College of South Jersey, opened in Deptford Township in 1968, with classes held at Monongahela Junior High School and Deptford Township High School.

== Transportation ==
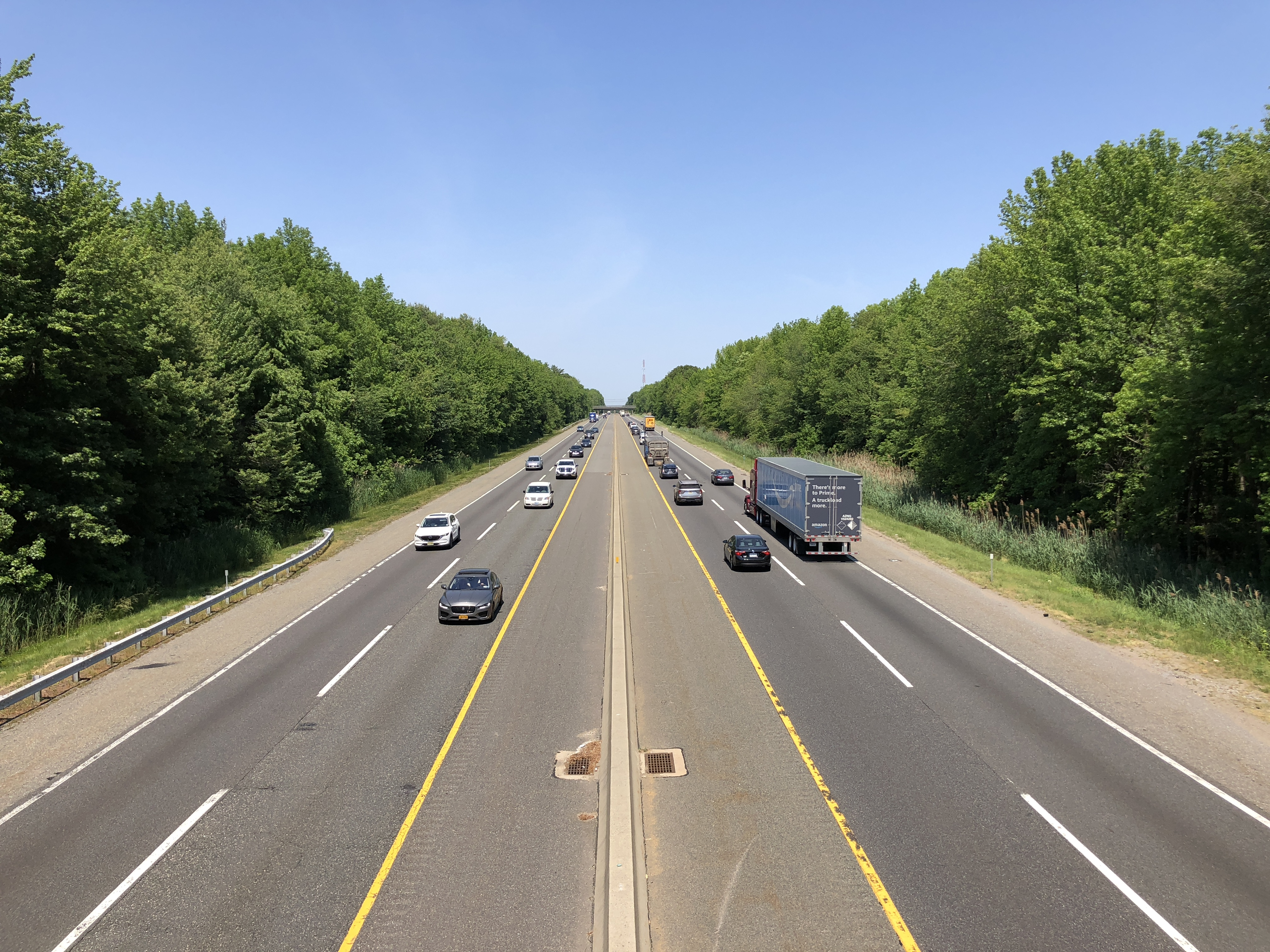
The New Jersey Turnpike in Deptford Township, May 2021

=== Roads and highways ===
As of May 2010, the township had a total of 150.03 miles (241.45 km) of roadways. Of this, 99.01 miles (159.34 km) were maintained by the municipality, 28.87 miles (46.46 km) by Gloucester County, 18.75 miles (30.18 km) by the New Jersey Department of Transportation, and 3.40 miles (5.47 km) by the New Jersey Turnpike Authority.

Several major transportation routes crisscross Deptford Township. These include Route 41, Route 42, Route 45, Route 47, and Route 55. County roads include County Route 534, County Route 544, County Route 551, and County Route 553. The New Jersey Turnpike passes through the area at Exit 3 at Bellmawr and Runnemede. A very short section of Interstate 295 passes through the township for .07 miles (0.11 km).

=== Public transportation ===
NJ Transit bus service is available to Philadelphia from Deptford Township on the 400, 401, 402, 408, 410, and 412 routes. Local service is provided on the 455 and 463 routes.

== Notable people ==
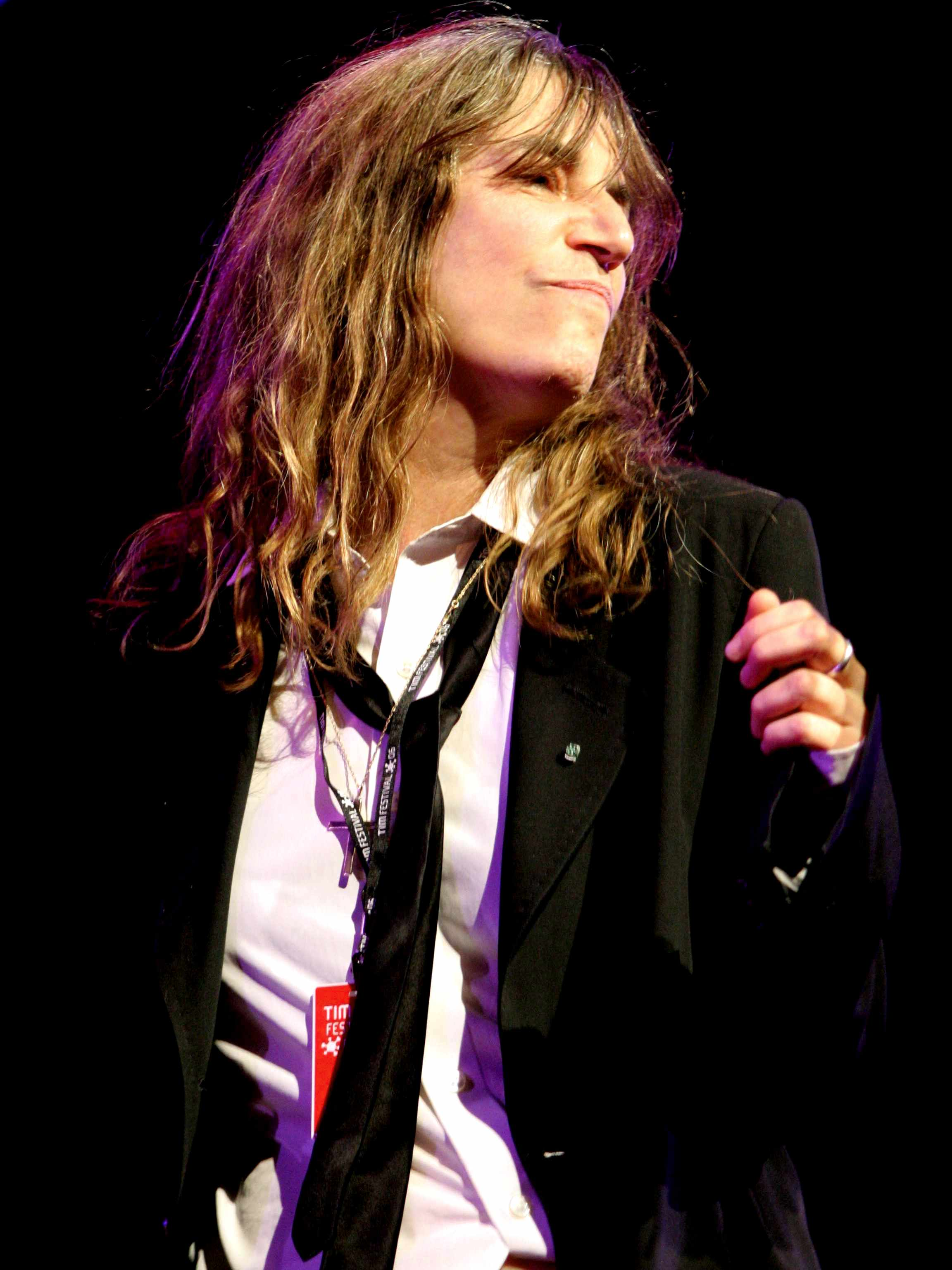
Rock musician Patti Smith from Deptford Township

People who were born in, residents of, or closely associated with Deptford Township include:

- Enrico Di Giuseppe (1932–2005), operatic tenor who performed with the New York City Opera and the Metropolitan Opera
- Evan Edinger (born 1990), YouTuber
- Joe Fields (born 1953), former professional American football center and guard who played in the NFL for the New York Jets and the New York Giants
- Kenneth A. Gewertz (1934–2006), politician who served as Mayor of Deptford Township and in the New Jersey General Assembly
- Isaac Hopper (1771–1852), abolitionist, founder of the Underground Railroad
- Michael Johns (born 1964), health care executive, former White House speechwriter, conservative policy analyst and writer
- Katrina Law (born c. 1985), actress
- Bob Levy (born 1962), stand-up comic
- Dave Rowe (born 1945), former professional football player who played for the Baltimore Colts, New England Patriots, Oakland Raiders and San Diego Chargers
- Shaun T (born 1978), motivational speaker, fitness trainer and choreographer best known for his home fitness programs T25, Insanity and Hip-Hop Abs
- Mel Sheppard (1883–1942), winner of four gold medals at the 1908 Summer Olympics and 1912 Summer Olympics
- Patti Smith (born 1946), punk rock singer-songwriter, musician, author, and poet
- Gary Stuhltrager (born 1955), eight-term member of the New Jersey General Assembly
- Crystal Waters (born 1961), house and dance music singer and songwriter
- Lillian Willoughby (1915–2009), Quaker activist who advocated for world peace and founded Take Back the Night

== In popular culture ==
Deptford Township is featured briefly in the film Patti Smith: Dream of Life, a 2008 documentary about rock musician Patti Smith.
