= Benjamin Clark House =

Historic house in New Jersey, United States

- U.S. National Register of Historic Places
- New Jersey Register of Historic Places
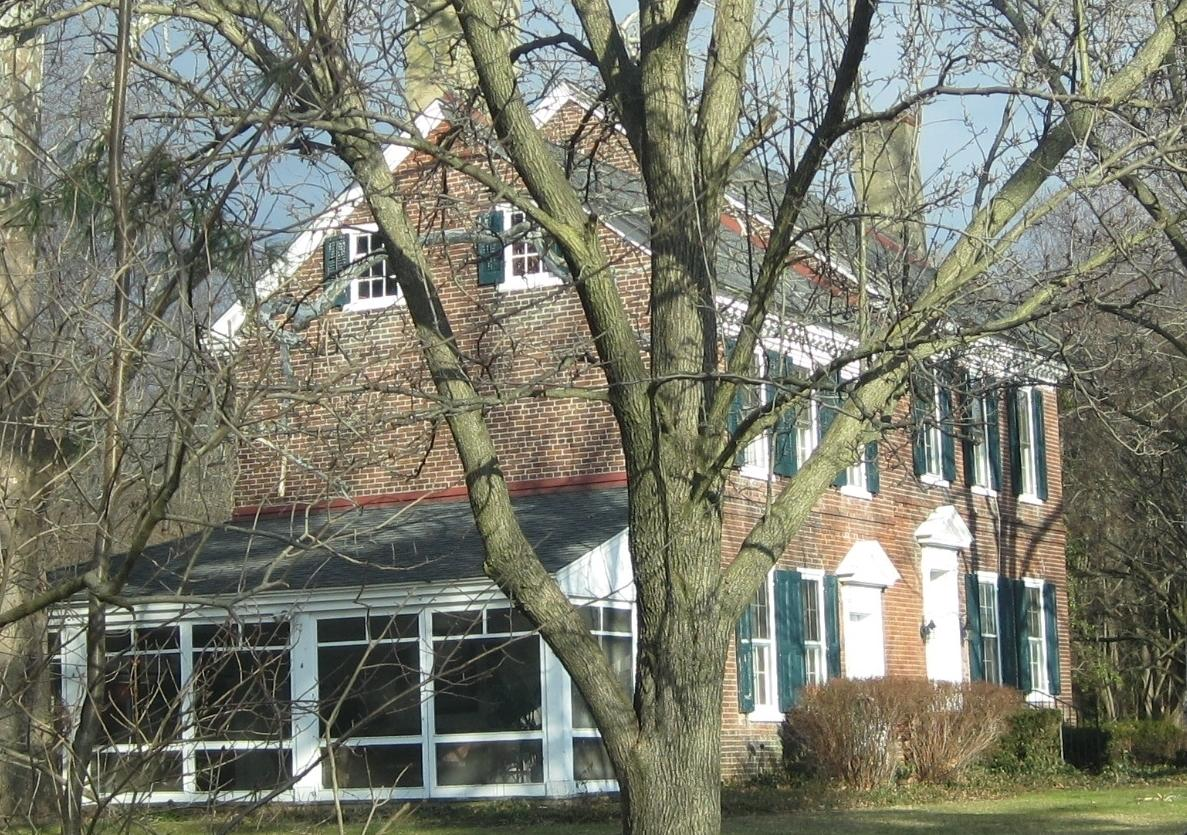
- Benjamin Clark House in January 2010

- Location within Gloucester County, New Jersey Location within New Jersey Location within the United States
- Location: Glassboro Road, Deptford Township, New Jersey, U.S.
- Coordinates: 39°47′7″N 75°8′14″W
- Area: 91.7 acres (37.1 ha)
- Built: c. 1769
- Architectural style: Georgian, Federal
- NRHP reference No.: 73001099
- NJRHP No.: 1373

Significant dates
- Added to NRHP: January 25, 1973
- Designated NJRHP: May 1, 1972

The Benjamin Clark House is located on Glassboro Road in the township of Deptford, near the borough of Wenonah, in Gloucester County, New Jersey, United States. The historic red brick house was built around 1769 and was added to the National Register of Historic Places on January 25, 1973, for its significance in architecture and military history.

The house was extended in 1801 and restored around 1940. It has features of Georgian and Federal architectures. Benjamin Clark was a farmer and soldier during the American Revolutionary War. He delivered grain to Valley Forge during the winter of 1777–1778.

== See also ==
- National Register of Historic Places listings in Gloucester County, New Jersey
