= Église Notre-Dame de Calais =

- Église Notre-Dame de Calais
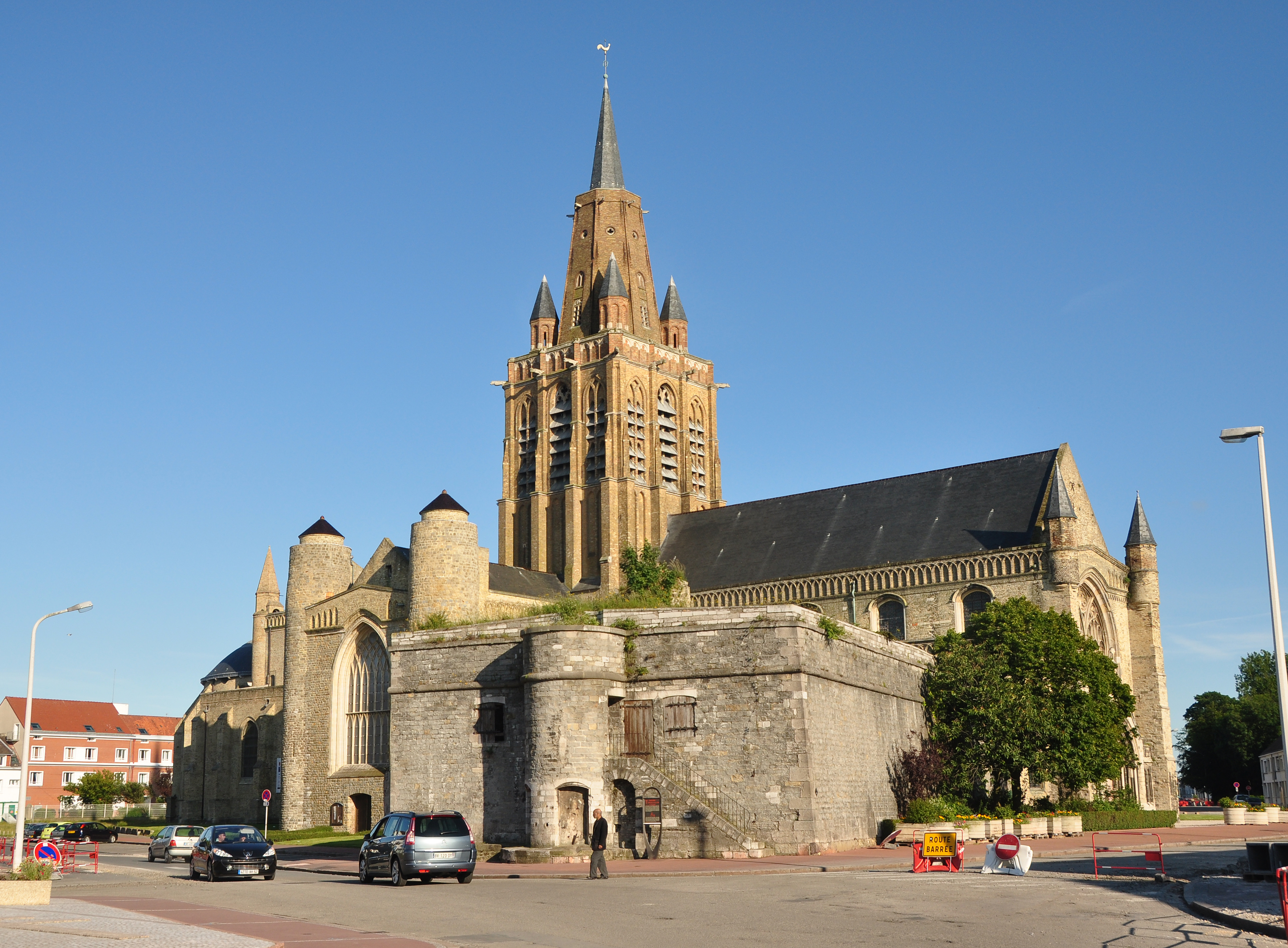

- Location in the Pas-de-Calais
- 50.95833°N 1.85306°E
- Location: Calais
- Country: France
- Denomination: Catholic

Architecture
- Heritage designation: Historic Monument
- Designated: 10 September 1913
- Style: English perpendicular

Specifications
- Length: 88 m (289 ft)
- Width: 45 m (148 ft)
- Height: 58.5 m (192 ft)

Administration
- Diocese: Arras
- Deanery: Calaisis
- Parish: Calais Notre Dame

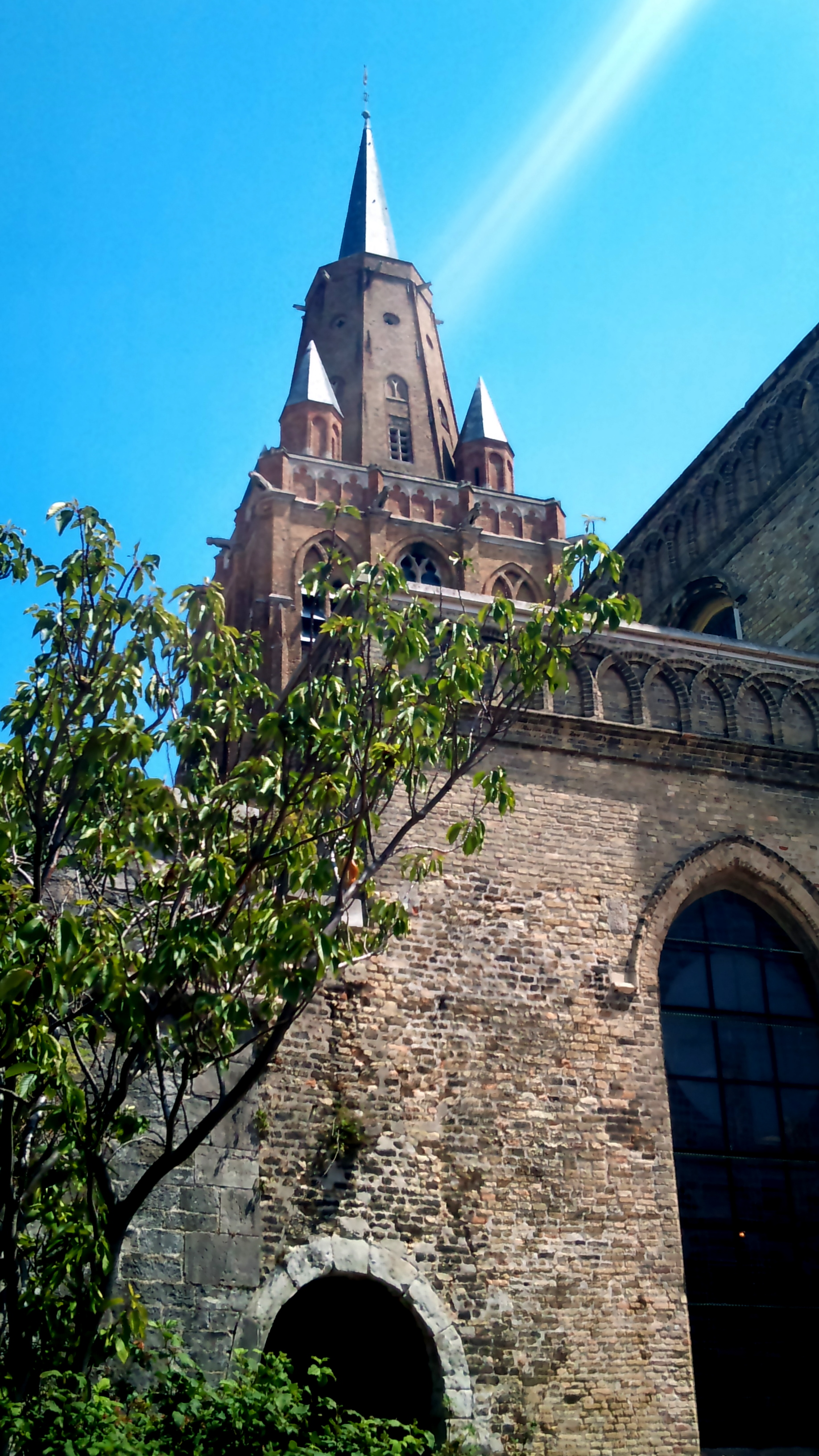
Church of Our Lady in Calais

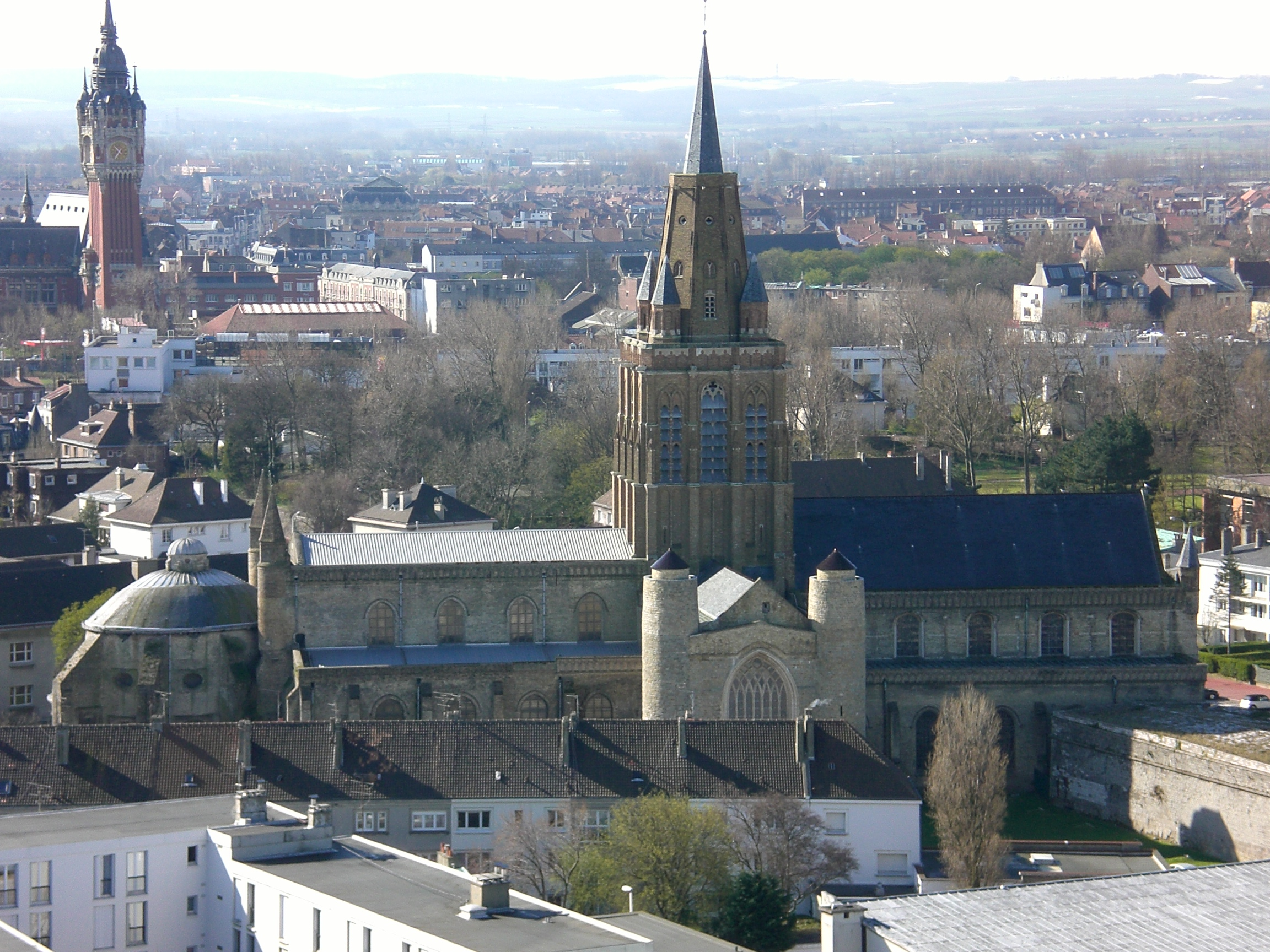
Church of Our Lady in Calais with the town hall belfry in the background.

Église Notre-Dame ("The Church of Our Lady") is a Catholic parish church located on Rue de la Paix, in Calais, department of Pas-de-Calais, in northern France. It dates from the 12th century, and chiefly from the 14th century. Arguably, it is the only church built in the English perpendicular style in all of France.

== History ==
The church was damaged during the early wars between France and England, especially in 1346–47, after the Battle of Crécy. Many of the kings and queens of France and England prayed here; and John Bourchier, 2nd Baron Berners is buried in the church choir.

On 11 July 1469 George Plantagenet, 1st Duke of Clarence, the third surviving son of Richard Plantagenet, 3rd Duke of York, and Cecily Neville, and the brother of English Kings Edward IV and Richard III, was married to Isabel Neville, by Rt. Revd. George Neville, Archbishop of York.

The tower of Notre Dame church was used as an observation point for the Anglo-French Survey (1784–1790), which used trigonometry to calculate the precise distance between the Paris Observatory and the Royal Greenwich Observatory. Cross-channel sightings were made in September and October 1787 of signal lights at Dover Castle and Fairlight Down, and vice versa.

In 1785, after the first hot air balloon crossing of the English Channel by Jean-Pierre Blanchard, Louis XVI ordered the balloon and boat be hung up in the church.

In 1843 some medieval paintings were discovered under a thick coat of whitewash by Monsieur. C. de Rheims. One comprised a female figure holding in her right hand an orange coloured shield charged with nine bezants d’or; her left hand resting on a spear with banner displayed, and charged as the shield. At her feet was a kneeling figure; in the background a fortified city. Another painting represented the Virgin with the infant Jesus, and a figure, apparently a bishop with episcopal staff, kneeling and invoking her. Each of the frescoes was surrounded with a border on which the motto Le Jour Viendra occurred ten times, alternately separated by a club of gold entwined with branches and flowers, with the arms of the Woodhouse family, one of whom was the embellisher of the church and the originator of the paintings. At the bottom of the former painting was written Orate pro anima Thoms Wodehous.

It was classified as a historical monument on 13 September 1913.

Charles de Gaulle and Yvonne Vendroux were married in the church on 7 April 1921.

It was bombarded by Allied Forces on 23 September 1944. It was substantially damaged and the bell tower fell through the roof into the north transept.

A campaign of restoration began in the 1960s.

- 1963-1973: Reconstruction of the nave and bell tower
- 1976 onwards: Addition of stained glass windows by Gérard Lardeur
- 2002-2013: Restoration of the choir and chapel.

== Architecture and fittings ==
The church is large and has a fortress-like appearance. Its layout is in the shape of a Latin cross. There is a large nave with aisles, north and south transepts, a choir with choir-aisles, and a side chapel. A notable feature is the high altar, mostly completed by 1626, which has carvings and bas-relief. A pedestal and a statue are dated 1628, while two other statues were added in 1629, and the balustrades finished in 1648. It was made by Adam Lottman. The painting “the Assumption of the Virgin” is by Gerard Seghers. Among the works of art is a painting once considered by Peter Paul Rubens of the Descent from the Cross. It is in fact by Pieter Van Mol.
