= Oak Valley, New Jersey =

Populated place in Gloucester County, New Jersey, US

- Census-designated place
- Location of Oak Valley in Gloucester County highlighted in red (left). Inset map: Location of Gloucester County in New Jersey highlighted in orange (right).

- Location in Gloucester County Location in New Jersey Location in the United States
- Coordinates: 39.806271°N 75.158815°W
- Country: United States
- State: New Jersey
- County: Gloucester
- Township: Deptford

Area
  - Total: 0.70 sq mi (1.81 km^{2})
  - Land: 0.70 sq mi (1.81 km^{2})
  - Water: 0 sq mi (0.00 km^{2}) 0.51%
- Elevation: 85 ft (26 m)

Population (2020)
  - Total: 3,497
  - Density: 5,013.3/sq mi (1,935.65/km^{2})
- Time zone: UTC−05:00 (Eastern (EST))
  - Summer (DST): UTC−04:00 (EDT)
- ZIP Code: 08090 - Wenonah
- Area code: 856
- FIPS code: 34-54060
- GNIS feature ID: 02389602

Oak Valley is an unincorporated community and census-designated place (CDP) located within Deptford Township in Gloucester County, in the U.S. state of New Jersey. As of the 2020 census, Oak Valley had a population of 3,497.

Oak Valley and neighboring Pine Acres are located east of Route 45, isolated from the rest of Deptford Township, requiring residents to drive through the neighboring communities of Woodbury Heights or Wenonah to reach other destinations in the township. The neighborhood was built between the mid-1950s and 1963 on a combination of farmland, fruit orchards and the former grounds of the Forest View Country Club, later known as Oak Valley Country Club, which was a golf course that closed down during the Great Depression.

== Geography ==
According to the U.S. Census Bureau, the CDP had a total area of 0.711 square miles (1.84 km^{2}), including 0.707 square miles (1.83 km^{2}) of land and 0.004 square miles (0.010 km^{2}) of water (0.51%). It is located approximately 10 miles south of Philadelphia.

== Demographics ==
Historical population
Census	Pop.	Note	%±
1990	4,055		—
2000	3,747		−7.6%
2010	3,483		−7.0%
2020	3,497		0.4%
Population sources: 1950 1960 1970; 1980 1990 2000; 2010 2020

Oak Valley first appeared as a census designated place in the 1990 U.S. census.

=== Racial and ethnic composition ===
Oak Valley CDP, New Jersey – Racial and ethnic composition Note: the US Census treats Hispanic/Latino as an ethnic category. This table excludes Latinos from the racial categories and assigns them to a separate category. Hispanics/Latinos may be of any race.
Race / Ethnicity (NH = Non-Hispanic)	Pop 2000	Pop 2010	Pop 2020	% 2000	% 2010	% 2020
White alone (NH)	3,446	3,187	2,935	91.97%	91.50%	83.93%
Black or African American alone (NH)	143	95	116	3.82%	2.73%	3.32%
Native American or Alaska Native alone (NH)	8	7	7	0.21%	0.20%	0.20%
Asian alone (NH)	28	29	49	0.75%	0.83%	1.40%
Native Hawaiian or Pacific Islander alone (NH)	0	0	2	0.00%	0.00%	0.06%
Other race alone (NH)	2	3	6	0.05%	0.09%	0.17%
Mixed race or Multiracial (NH)	36	55	168	0.96%	1.58%	4.80%
Hispanic or Latino (any race)	84	107	214	2.24%	3.07%	6.12%
Total	3,747	3,483	3,497	100.00%	100.00%	100.00%

=== 2020 census ===
As of the 2020 census, Oak Valley had a population of 3,497. The median age was 40.1 years. 20.4% of residents were under the age of 18 and 15.1% were 65 years of age or older. For every 100 females, there were 96.0 males, and for every 100 females age 18 and older, there were 93.7 males.

100.0% of residents lived in urban areas, while 0.0% lived in rural areas.

There were 1,283 households, of which 31.2% had children under the age of 18. Of all households, 54.2% were married-couple households, 13.1% had a male householder and no spouse or partner present, and 24.1% had a female householder and no spouse or partner present. About 18.5% of all households were made up of individuals, and 9.6% had someone living alone who was 65 years of age or older.

There were 1,323 housing units, of which 3.0% were vacant. The homeowner vacancy rate was 0.9% and the rental vacancy rate was 2.6%.

=== 2010 census ===
The 2010 United States census counted 3,483 people, 1,233 households, and 977 families in the CDP. The population density was 4,926.1 people per square mile (1,902.0 people/km^{2}). There were 1,315 housing units at an average density of 1,859.8 units per square mile (718.1 units/km^{2}). The racial makeup was 93.48% (3,256) White, 3.10% (108) Black or African American, 0.34% (12) Native American, 0.83% (29) Asian, 0.00% (0) Pacific Islander, 0.57% (20) from other races, and 1.67% (58) from two or more races. Hispanic or Latino of any race were 3.07% (107) of the population.

Of the 1,233 households, 29.7% had children under the age of 18; 59.7% were married couples living together; 14.5% had a female householder with no husband present and 20.8% were non-families. Of all households, 17.3% were made up of individuals and 9.2% had someone living alone who was 65 years of age or older. The average household size was 2.82 and the average family size was 3.18.

21.6% of the population were under the age of 18, 9.6% from 18 to 24, 25.3% from 25 to 44, 27.0% from 45 to 64, and 16.5% who were 65 years of age or older. The median age was 40.4 years. For every 100 females, the population had 94.3 males. For every 100 females ages 18 and older there were 92.5 males.

=== 2000 census ===
As of the 2000 United States census there were 3,747 people, 1,305 households, and 1,060 families residing in Oak Valley. The population density was 2,066.7 people/km^{2} (5,353 people/mi^{2}). There were 1,322 housing units at an average density of 729.2 units/km^{2} (1,889 units/mi^{2}). The racial makeup was 93.43% White, 4.06% African American, 0.27% Native American, 0.80% Asian, 0.27% from other races, and 1.17% from two or more races. Hispanic or Latino of any race were 2.24% of the population.

There were 1,305 households, out of which 36.3% had children under the age of 18 living with them, 63.4% were married couples living together, 12.3% had a female householder with no husband present, and 18.7% were non-families. 16.5% of all households were made up of individuals, and 8.0% had someone living alone who was 65 years of age or older. The average household size was 2.87 and the average family size was 3.20.

In Oak Valley the population was spread out, with 25.4% under the age of 18, 7.2% from 18 to 24, 31.8% from 25 to 44, 20.9% from 45 to 64, and 14.8% who were 65 years of age or older. The median age was 37 years. For every 100 females, there were 95.3 males. For every 100 females age 18 and over, there were 92.4 males.

The median income for a household was $50,746, and the median income for a family was $55,573. Males had a median income of $36,250 versus $25,350 for females. The per capita income for the CDP was $19,148. About 3.0% of families and 3.7% of the population were below the poverty line, including 3.7% of those under age 18 and 3.8% of those age 65 or over.
