= Blood chit =

Notice requesting help for military personnel

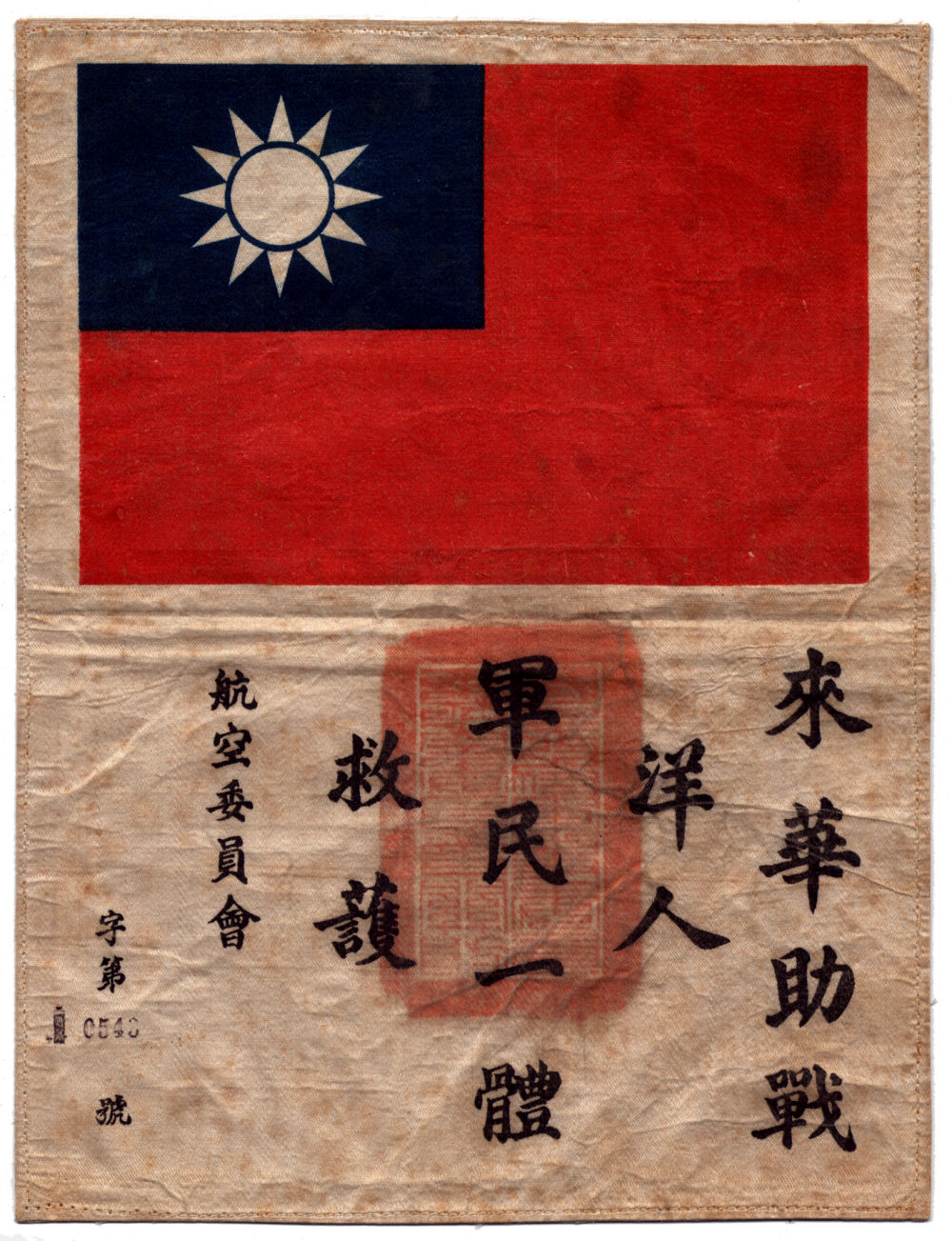
A "blood chit" issued to the American Volunteer Group Flying Tigers. The Chinese characters read: "This foreigner has come to China to help in the war effort. Soldiers and civilians, one and all, should rescue and protect him". (R.E. Baldwin Collection)

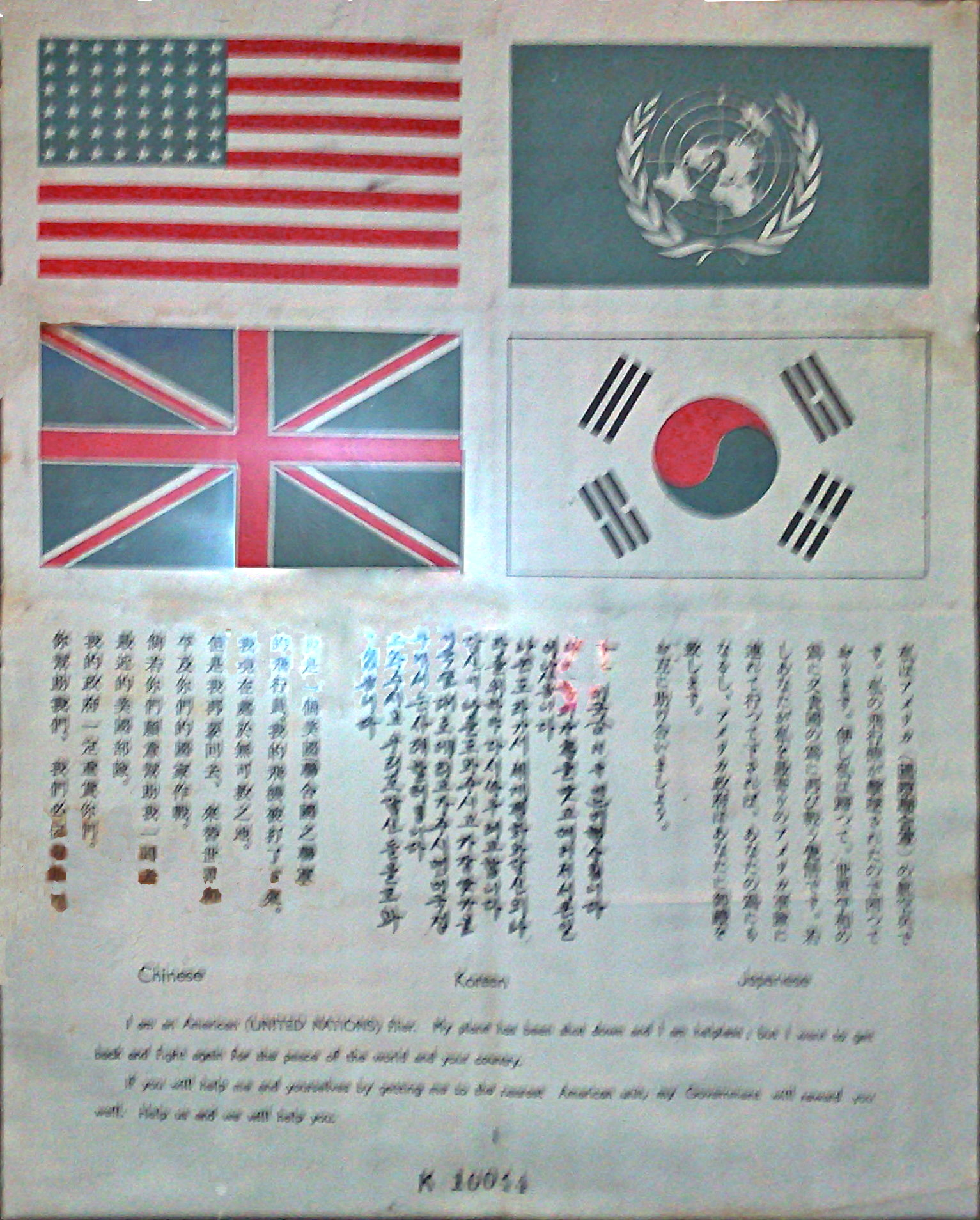
A blood chit used by UN pilots during the Korean War. (Australian War Memorial) The text (in Chinese, Korean, Japanese, and English) says: I am an American (UNITED NATIONS) pilot. My plane has been shot down and I am helpless, but I want to get back and fight again for the peace of the world and your country. If you will help me and yourselves by getting me to the nearest American unit, my Government will reward you. Help me and we will help you.

A blood chit (Chinese: 血幅; pinyin: xuè fú) is a notice carried by military personnel and addressed to any civilians who may come across an armed-services member – such as a shot-down pilot – in difficulties. As well as identifying the force to which the bearer belongs as friendly, the notice displays a message requesting that the service member be rendered every assistance.

== Etymology ==
Alternative names are escape flag and identification flag (Chinese: 人物證明書; pinyin: rénwù zhèngmíng shū). "Chit" is a British English term for a small document, note or pass, representing a debt to be paid; it is an Anglo-Indian word dating from the late 18th century, derived from Hindi citthi.

== History ==
The first blood chit may have been made in 1793 when French balloonist Jean-Pierre Blanchard demonstrated his hot air balloon in the United States. Because he could not control the direction of the balloon, no one knew where he would land. Because Blanchard did not speak English, George Washington, according to legend, gave him a letter that said that all U.S. citizens were obliged to assist him to return to Philadelphia.

In World War I, British Royal Flying Corps pilots in India and Mesopotamia carried a "goolie chit" printed in four local languages that promised a reward to anyone who would bring an unharmed British aviator back to British lines.

In the Second Sino-Japanese War prior to World War II, foreign volunteer pilots of Flying Tigers carried notices printed in Chinese that informed the locals that this foreign pilot was fighting for China and they were obliged to help them. A text from one such blood chit translates as follows:

I am an American airman. My plane is destroyed. I cannot speak your language. I am an enemy of the Japanese. Please give me food and take me to the nearest Allied military post.

You will be rewarded.

On the UN chit from the Korean War, it is written in Japanese that cooperators will be rewarded and should help for his own 'benefit'.

=== United States Armed Forces ===
When the U.S. officially entered World War II in December 1941, flight crew survival kits included blood chits printed in 50 different languages that sported an American flag and promised a reward for a safe return of a pilot. The kit might also include gifts like gold coins, maps or sewing needles. Many U.S. flight crews that flew over Asia had their "blood chit" sewn to the back of their flight jackets. Some units added the blood chit to the crew's flight suits while other units gave the blood chit out only for specific flights. Currently, blood chits are a product of the Joint Personnel Recovery Agency. These recent government-issue items are a small sheet of Tyvek material with an American flag and a statement in several languages indicating that the U.S. will reward anyone assisting the bearer to safety. They constitute a written promise of the US Government. Retired General Norman Schwarzkopf recounted that the CENTCOM Judge Advocate General during the Gulf War forwarded his approval for US pilots to carry such a chit.

=== British Armed Forces ===
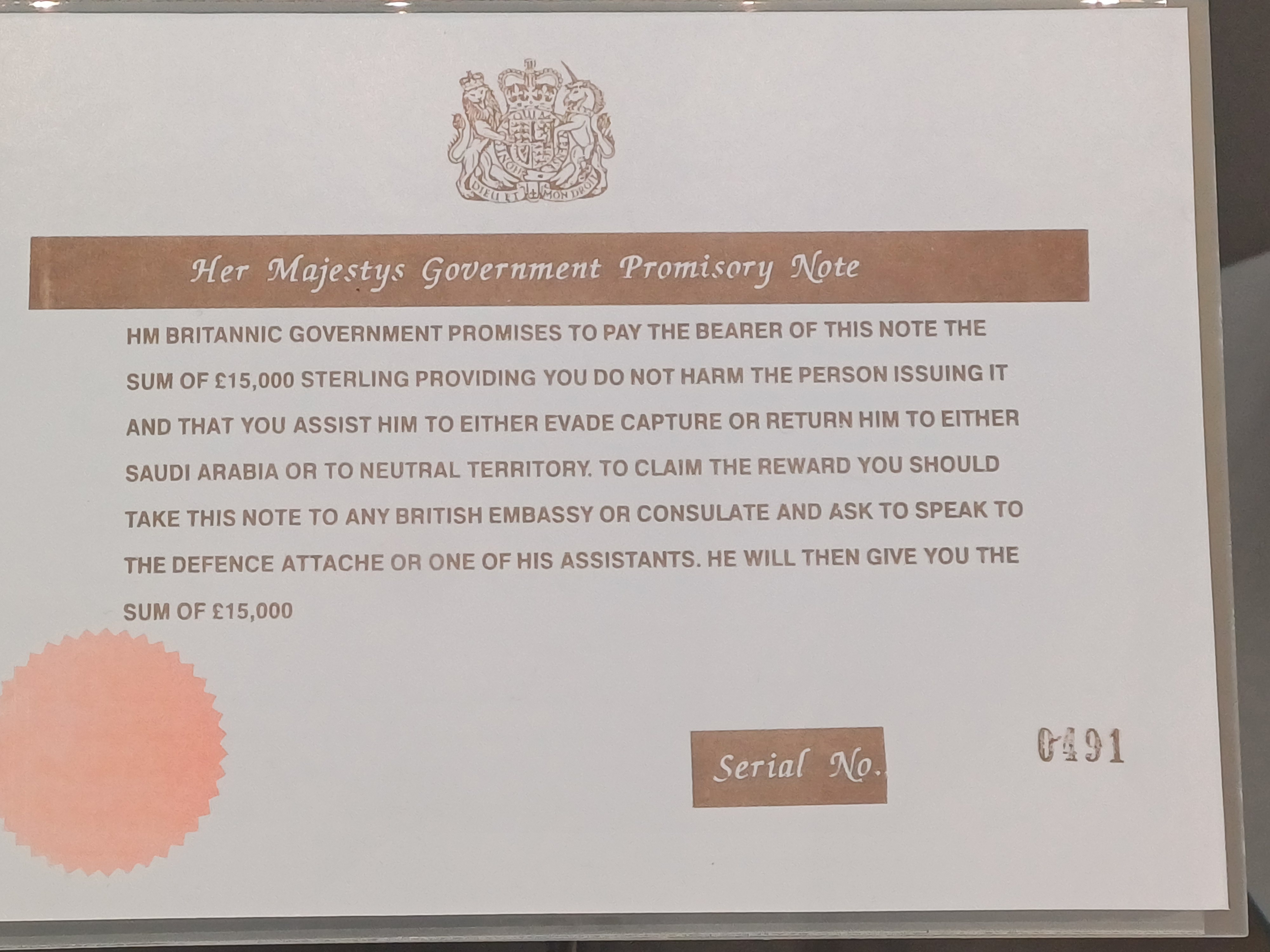
Blood chit issued to RAF Aircrew during the Gulf War 1991

Examples of blood chits issued to British RAF personnel in India in the 1940s are printed on thin sheets of silk cloth measuring 20 by 11½ inches (about 50 x 30 cm); they have the Union flag printed at the top left, and the following text in English and French alongside it:

Dear Friend,
I am an Allied fighter. I did not come here to do any harm to you who are my friends. I only want to do harm to the Japanese and chase them away from this country as quickly as possible.
If you will assist me, my Government will sufficiently reward you when the Japanese are driven away.

The main area of the document is printed in three columns with the same text in 15 Asian languages, including Malay, Burmese, Tamil, Thai and Bengali.

Such blood chits or goolie chits were issued to Royal Air Force pilots during the Gulf War. It identifies the bearer as friendly and is issued with gold sovereigns as an incentive. Peter Ratcliffe recounted that it was issued to Special Air Service troopers prior to deployment. The gold sovereigns had to be returned unless troopers could prove they were legitimately used. Peter de la Billière also recounted that all RAF aircrew were issued with "£800 in gold, to facilitate escape in case of trouble, and also a chit written in Arabic which promised that Her Majesty’s Government would pay the sum of £5000 to anyone who returned an airman intact to the Allies." Former Special Air Service Sergeant Chris Ryan also received the same type of chit and gave it to a Syrian driver during his escape from Iraq.

=== Americans during the Cold War ===
During the Cold War, Americans flying reconnaissance over Eastern Bloc countries would be given blood chits in those various languages (e.g. Polish, Czech, and Hungarian) The chits read:

I am an American. I do not speak your language. I need food, shelter and assistance. I will not harm you; I have no malice toward your people. If you help me, my government will reward you.

One of the blood chits belonging to an American pilot who was shot down by North Vietnamese air defenses is currently on display at the Hỏa Lò Prison Historical Site in Hanoi, Vietnam.

=== Norwegian Armed Forces ===
Norwegian commandos (spesialjegere) had chits—during the War in Afghanistan—in silk, sewn on the inside of the uniform belt.

== See also ==
- No quarter
