= Jean-Pierre Blanchard =

French inventor (1753–1809)

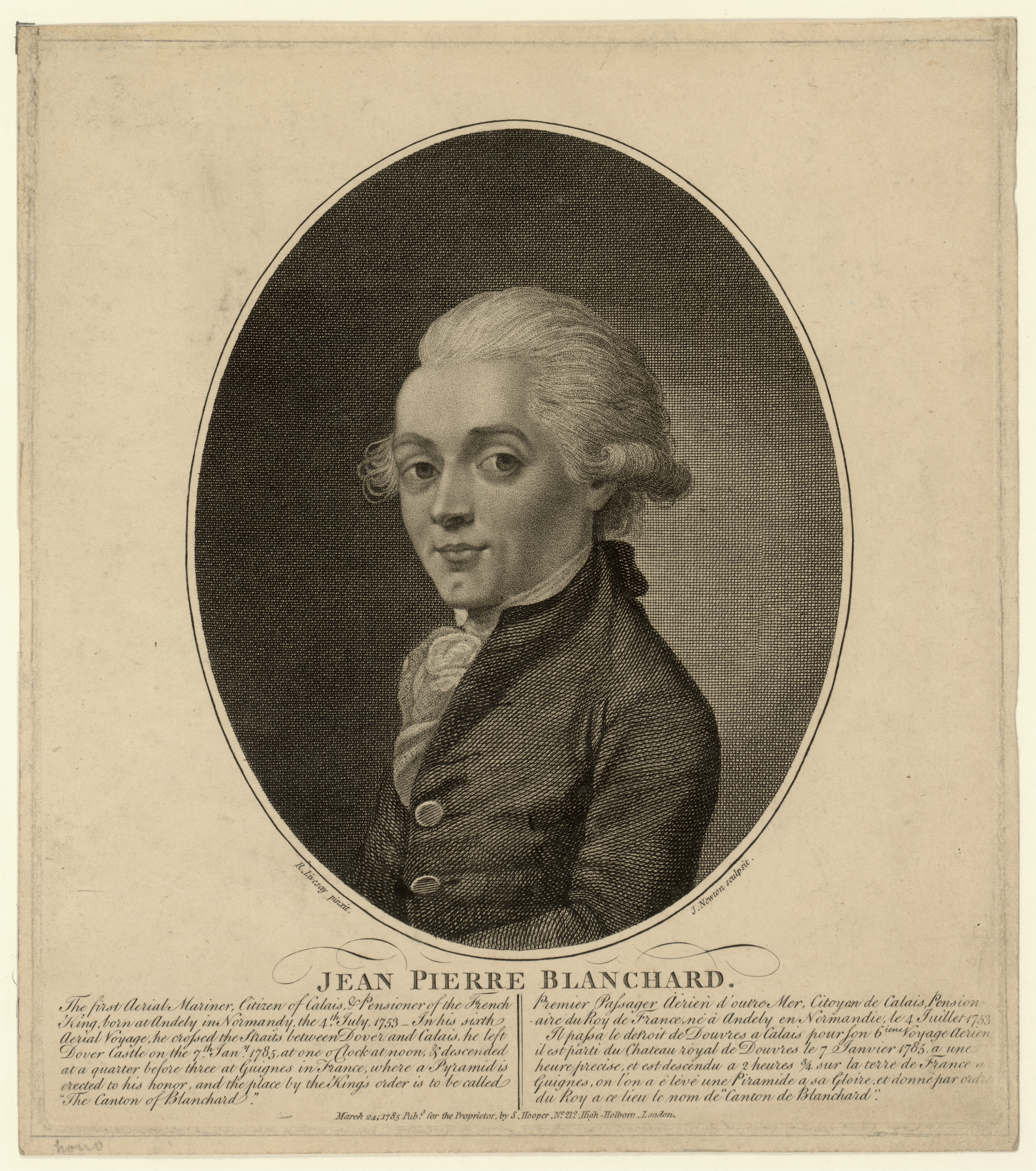
- A portrait of Blanchard by Richard Livesay
- Born: 4 July 1753; Les Andelys, France
- Died: 7 March 1809 (aged 55); The Hague, Holland
- Occupation: Inventor
- Known for: Ballooning
- Spouses: Victoire Lebrun (abandoned); Marie Madeleine-Sophie Armant

Jean-Pierre [François] Blanchard (French pronunciation: [ʒɑ̃ pjɛʁ blɑ̃ʃaʁ]; 4 July 1753 – 7 March 1809) was a French inventor, best known as a pioneer of gas balloon flight, who distinguished himself in the conquest of the air in a balloon, in particular the first aerial crossing of the English Channel, on 7 January 1785.

== Biography ==
=== 1784 – Flights in Paris ===
Blanchard made his first successful balloon flight in Paris on 2 March 1784, in a hydrogen gas balloon launched from the Champ de Mars. The first successful manned balloon flight took place on 21 November 1783, when Pilâtre de Rozier and the Marquis d'Arlandes took off at the Palace of Versailles in a free-flying hot air balloon constructed by the Montgolfier brothers. The first manned hydrogen balloon flight took place on 1 December 1783, when Jacques Charles and Nicolas-Louis Robert launched the first gas balloon from the Jardin des Tuileries in Paris. Blanchard's flight nearly ended in disaster, when one spectator (Dupont de Chambon, a contemporary of Napoleon at the École militaire de Brienne) slashed at the balloon's mooring ropes and oars with his sword after being refused a place on board. Blanchard intended to "row" northeast to La Villette but the balloon was pushed by the wind across the Seine to Billancourt and back again, landing in the rue de Sèvres. Blanchard adopted the Latin tag Sic itur ad astra as his motto.

The early balloon flights triggered a phase of the public "balloonomania", with all manner of objects decorated with images of balloons or styled au ballon, from ceramics to fans and hats. Clothing au ballon was produced with exaggerated puffed sleeves, rounded skirts, or with printed images of balloons. Hair was coiffed à la montgolfier, au globe volant, au demi-ballon, or à la Blanchard.

=== 1784 – Flights in London ===
Blanchard moved to London in August 1784, where he took part in a flight on 16 October 1784 with John Sheldon, just a few weeks after the first flight in Britain (and first outside France), when Italian Vincenzo Lunardi flew from Moorfields to Ware on 15 September 1784. Blanchard's propulsion mechanisms – flapping wings and a windmill – again proved ineffective, but the balloon flew some 115 kilometres (71 mi) from Lewis Lochée's military academy in Little Chelsea, landing in Sunbury and then taking off again to end in Romsey. Blanchard took a second flight on 30 November 1784, taking off with an American, John Jeffries, from the Rhedarium behind Green Street Mayfair, London to Ingress in Kent.

=== 1785 – First flight over the English Channel ===
Blanchard's Column at Guînes
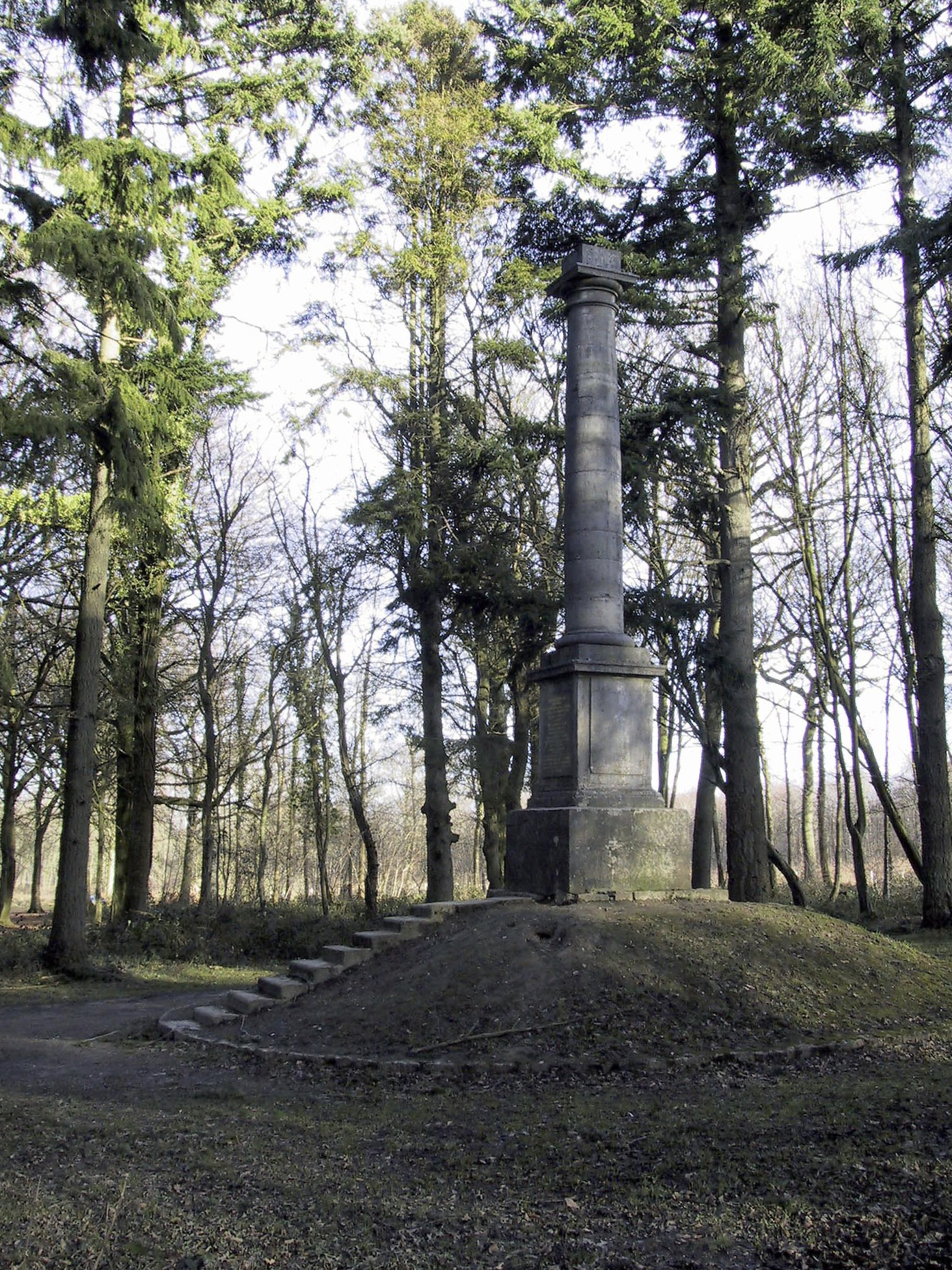
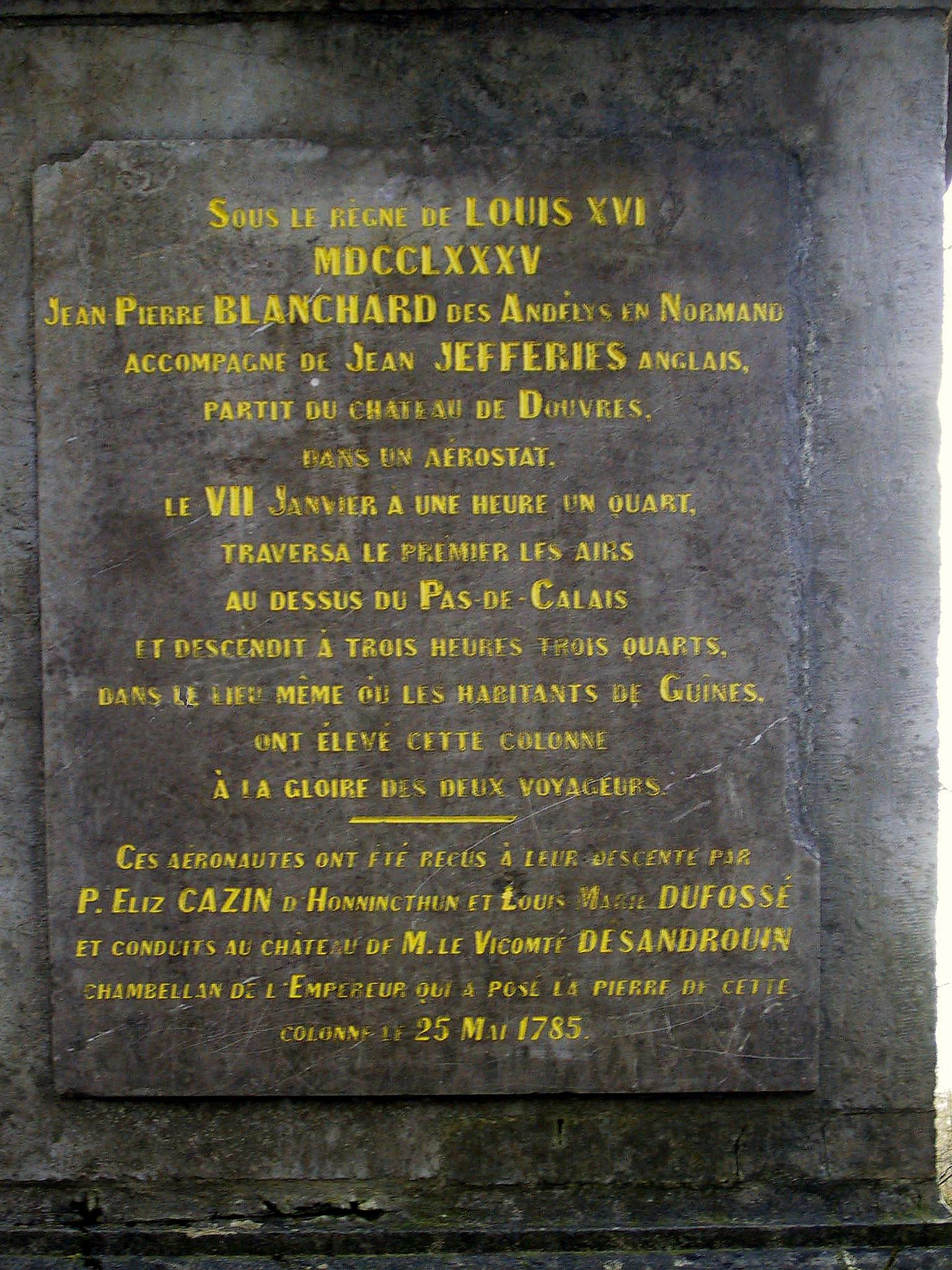
A column was erected at Guînes to commemorate his crossing of the English Channel by hydrogen balloon on 7 January 1785. (Location:50°50′31″N 1°52′02″E)
Under the reign of Louis XVI
MDCCLXXXV
Jean-Pierre Blanchard of Les Andelys in Normandy
accompanied by Jean Jefferies English (sic)
Leaving from Dover Castle
in an Aerostat.
January 7th at a quarter past one,
was the first to cross the air
above Pas-de-Calais
and descended after three and a quarter hours
in the very place where the inhabitants of Guines
raised this column
to the glory of the two travellers.

These aeronauts were received on their descent by
P. Eliz Casin d'Honnincthun and Louis Marie Dufosse.
and taken to the castle of M.Le Vicomte Desandrouin
Chamberlain of the Emperor who laid the stone of this
column on May 25, 1785. (Note: Original text of Blanchard's Column at Guînes: Sous le régné de Louis XVI MDCCLXXXV, Jean-Pierre Blanchard des Andelys en Normand, Accompagne de Jean Jefferies Anglais, Partit du chateau de Douvre dans un Aérostat, Le VII Janvier a une heure un quart, traversa le prémier les airs au dessus de Pas-de-Calais, et descendit de trois heures trois quarts dans le lieux même ou les habitants de Guînes. Ont élevé cette colonne À la gloire des deux voyageurs. Ces aeronauts en été recus à leur descent par P. Eliz Casin d'Honnincthun et Louis Marie Dufossé, Et conduits au château de M.Le Vicomté Desandrouin, Chambellan de L'Empereur qui a posé la pierre de cette colonne le 25 Mai 1785.)

A third flight, again with Jeffries, was the first flight over the English Channel, taking about 2½ hours to travel from England to France on 7 January 1785, flying from Dover Castle to Guînes. Blanchard was awarded a substantial pension by Louis XVI. The King ordered the balloon and boat be hung up in the church of Église Notre-Dame de Calais. (A subsequent Channel crossing attempt in the opposite direction by Pilâtre de Rozier on 15 June 1785 ended unsuccessfully in a fatal crash.)

=== Flights in Europe ===
Blanchard toured Europe, demonstrating his balloons. He holds the record of first balloon flights in Belgium, Germany, the Netherlands, and Poland. Among the events that included demonstrations of his abilities as a balloonist was the coronation of Holy Roman Emperor Leopold II as King of Bohemia in Prague in September 1791.

Following the invention of the modern parachute in 1783 by Sébastien Lenormand in France, in 1785 Jean-Pierre Blanchard demonstrated it as a means of jumping safely from a balloon. While Blanchard's first parachute demonstrations were conducted with a dog as the passenger, he later had the opportunity to try it himself when in 1793 his hydrogen balloon ruptured and he used a parachute to escape. Subsequent development of the parachute focused on making it more compact. While the early parachutes were made of linen stretched over a wooden frame, in the late 1790s, Blanchard began making parachutes from folded silk, taking advantage of silk's strength and light weight.

=== 1793 – Flights in America ===
On 9 January 1793, Blanchard conducted the first balloon flight in the Americas. He launched his balloon from the prison yard of Walnut Street Jail in Philadelphia, Pennsylvania and landed at the Clement Oak in Deptford Township, New Jersey. One of the flight's witnesses that day was President George Washington, and the future presidents John Adams, Thomas Jefferson, James Madison, and James Monroe were also present. Blanchard left the United States in 1797.

== Personal life and death ==
He had abandoned his first wife, Victoire Lebrun, and their four children, when he met and married Marie Madeleine-Sophie Armant (better known as Sophie Blanchard) in 1804. On 20 February 1808 Blanchard had a heart attack while in his balloon at The Hague. He fell from the balloon and died roughly a year later on 7 March 1809 due to severe injuries. His widow continued to support herself with ballooning demonstrations until doing so also killed her.

== Pictures ==
Airship designed by Jean-Pierre Blanchard, 1784

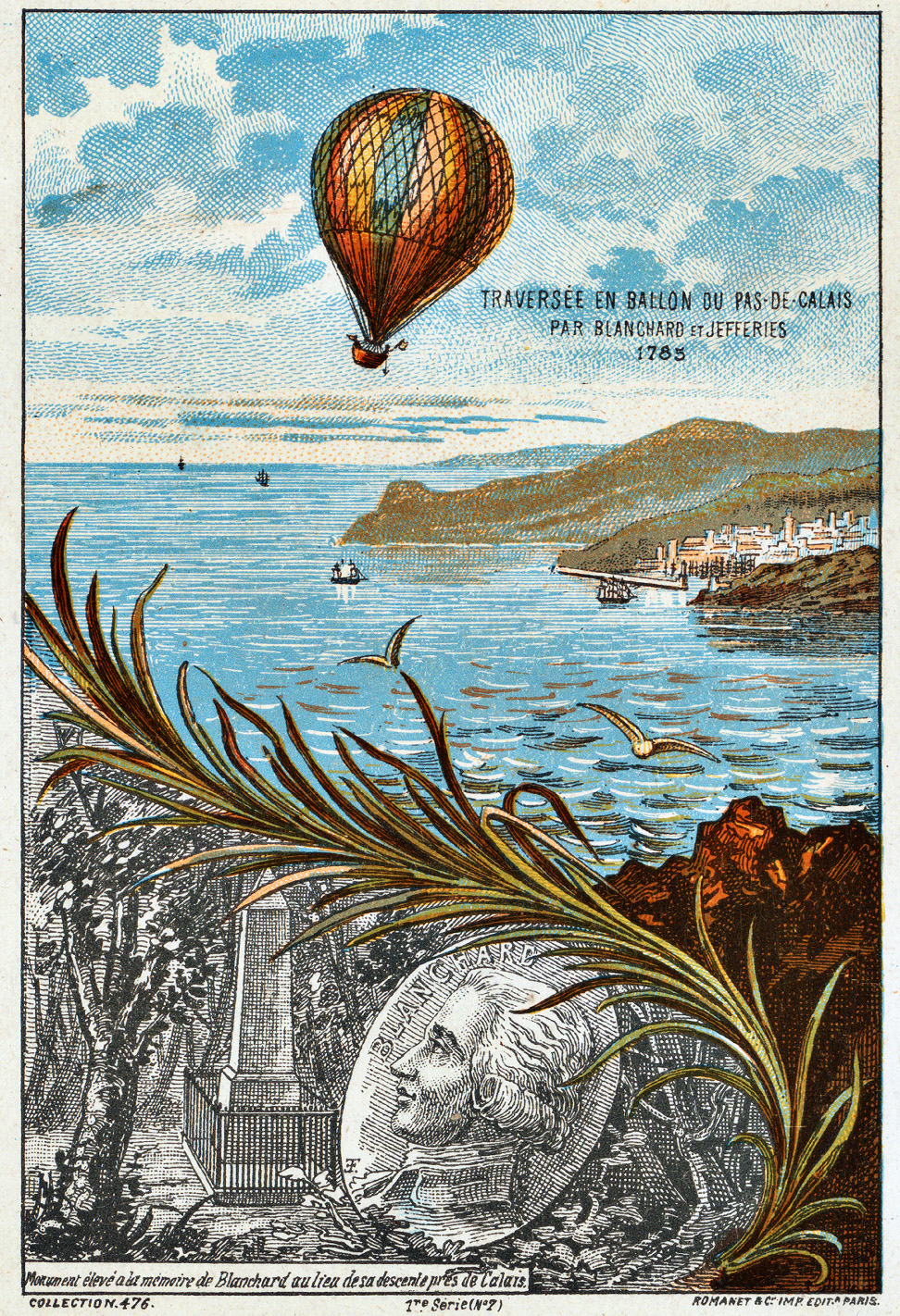
Crossing of the English Channel by Blanchard and Jeffries on 7 January 1785.

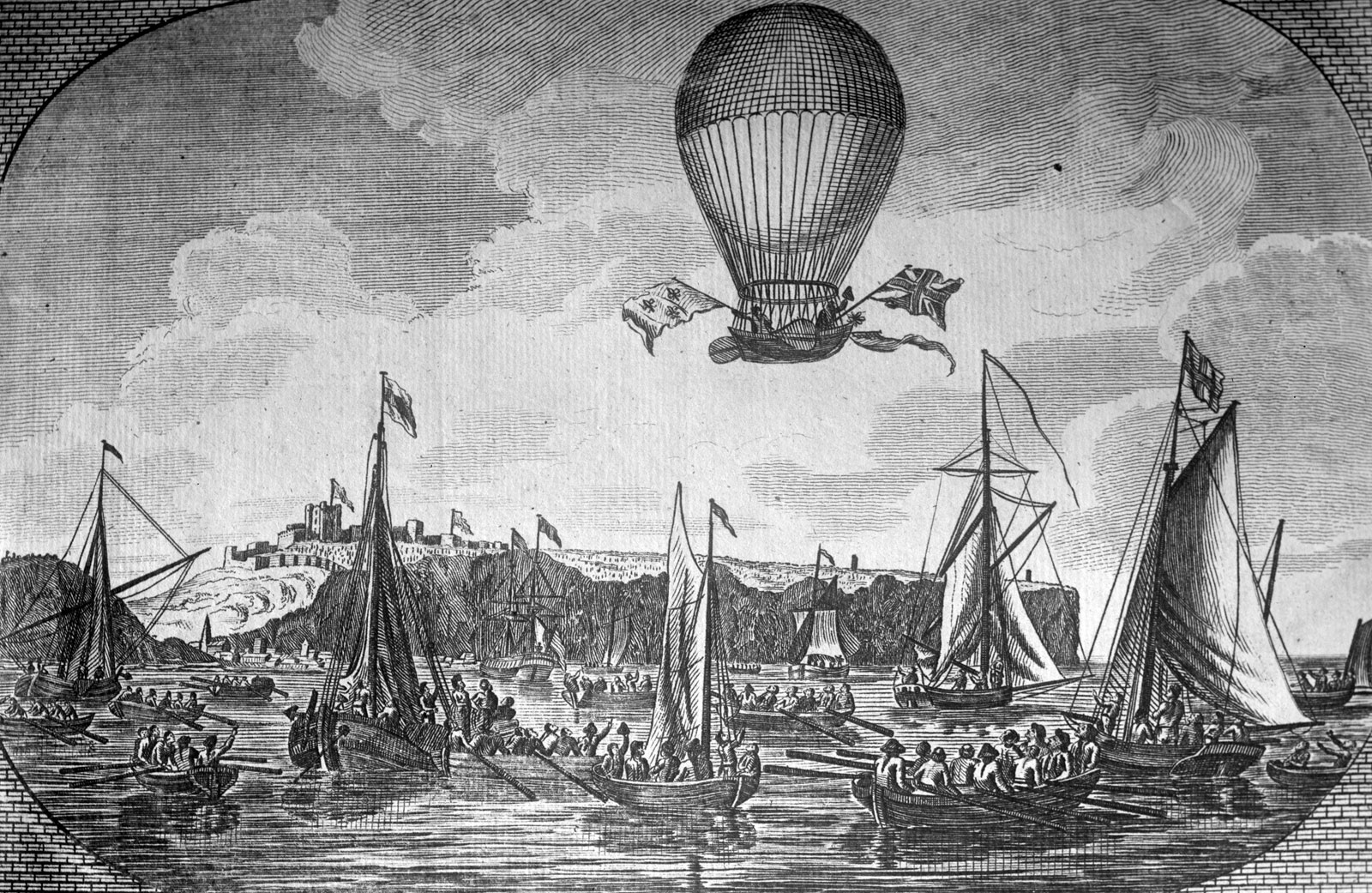
Crossing of the English Channel by Blanchard in 1785.

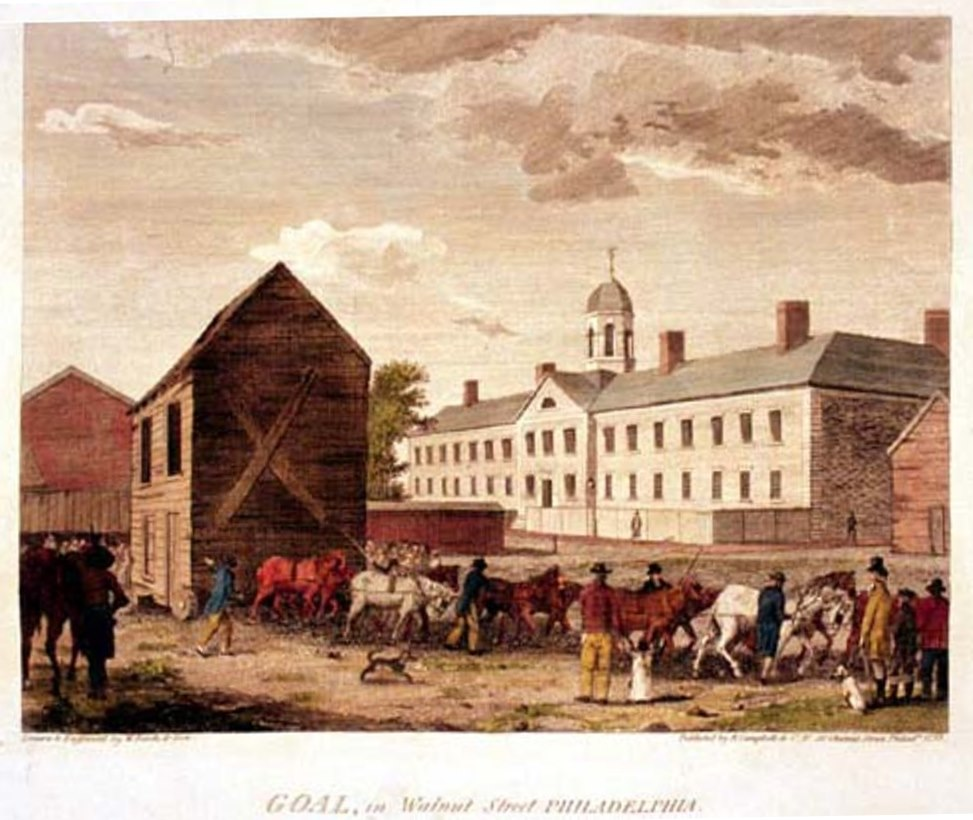
Walnut Street Jail, Philadelphia, Pennsylvania. Blanchard launched his 9 January 1793 American flight from the prison yard.

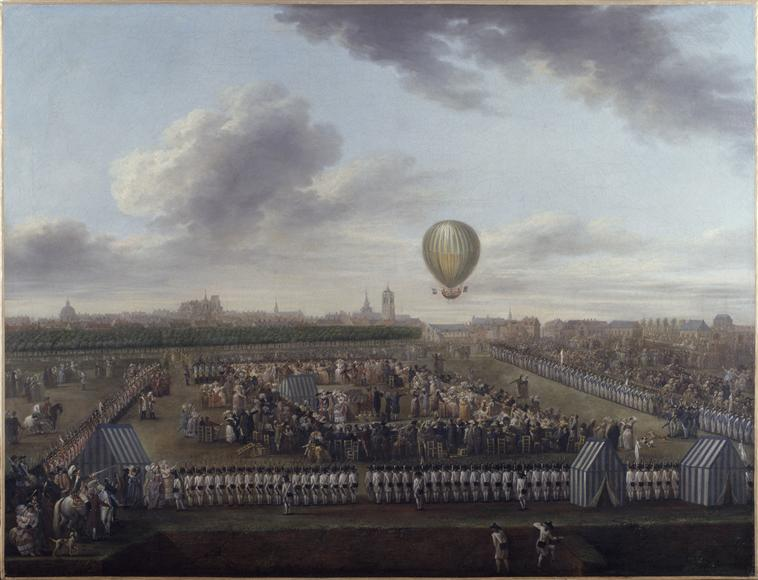
La 14e expérience aérostatique de Monsieur Blanchard accompagné du Chevalier Lépinard, Lille, 26 août 1785, painting by Louis Joseph Watteau

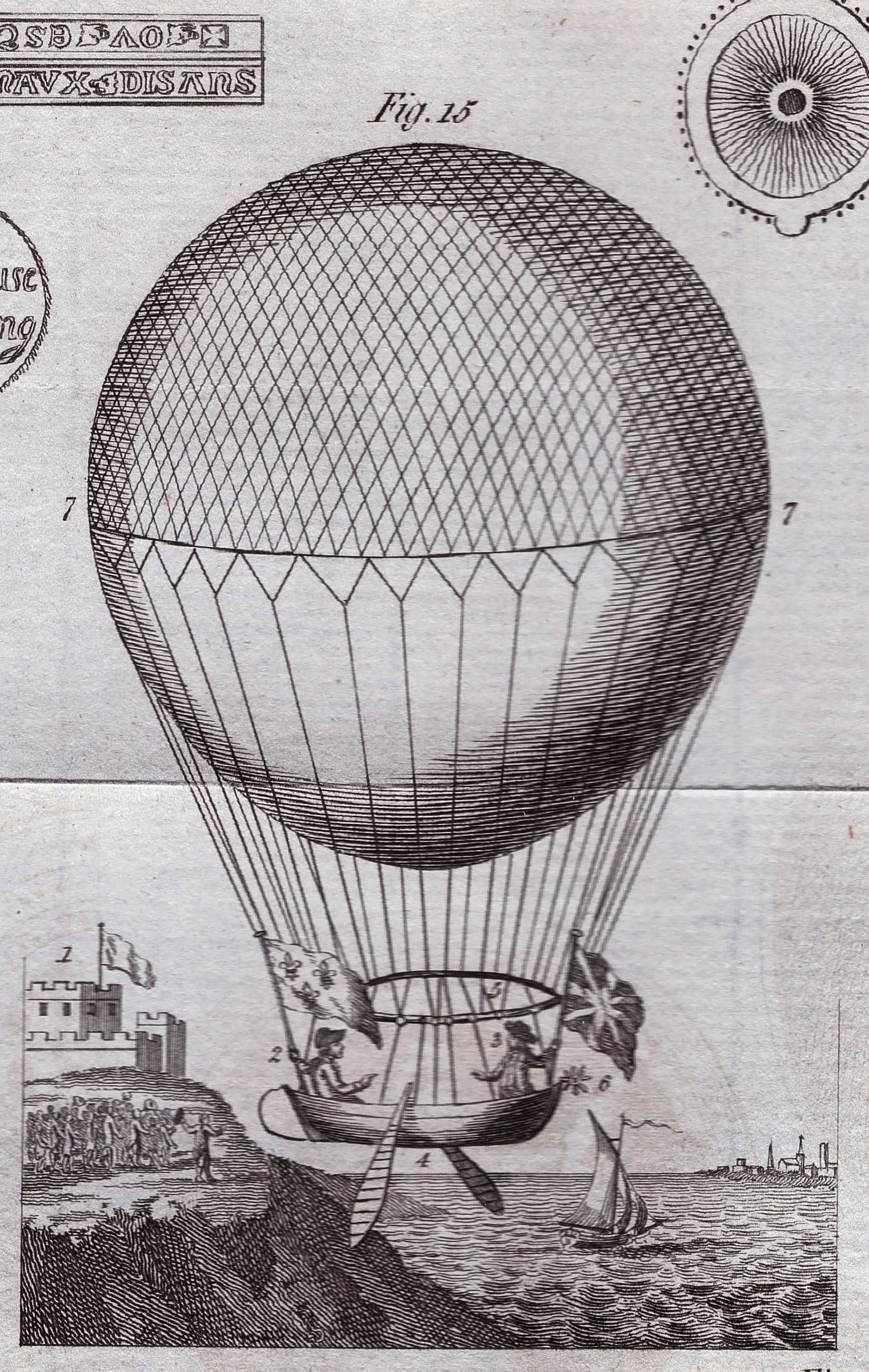
Blanchard and Jeffries Crossing the English Channel in 1785

== See also ==
- List of firsts in aviation
- Timeline of hydrogen technologies
