= Quartier de la Muette =

Coordinates: 48.8579754°N 2.274062°E

La Muette
- Quartier de la Muette
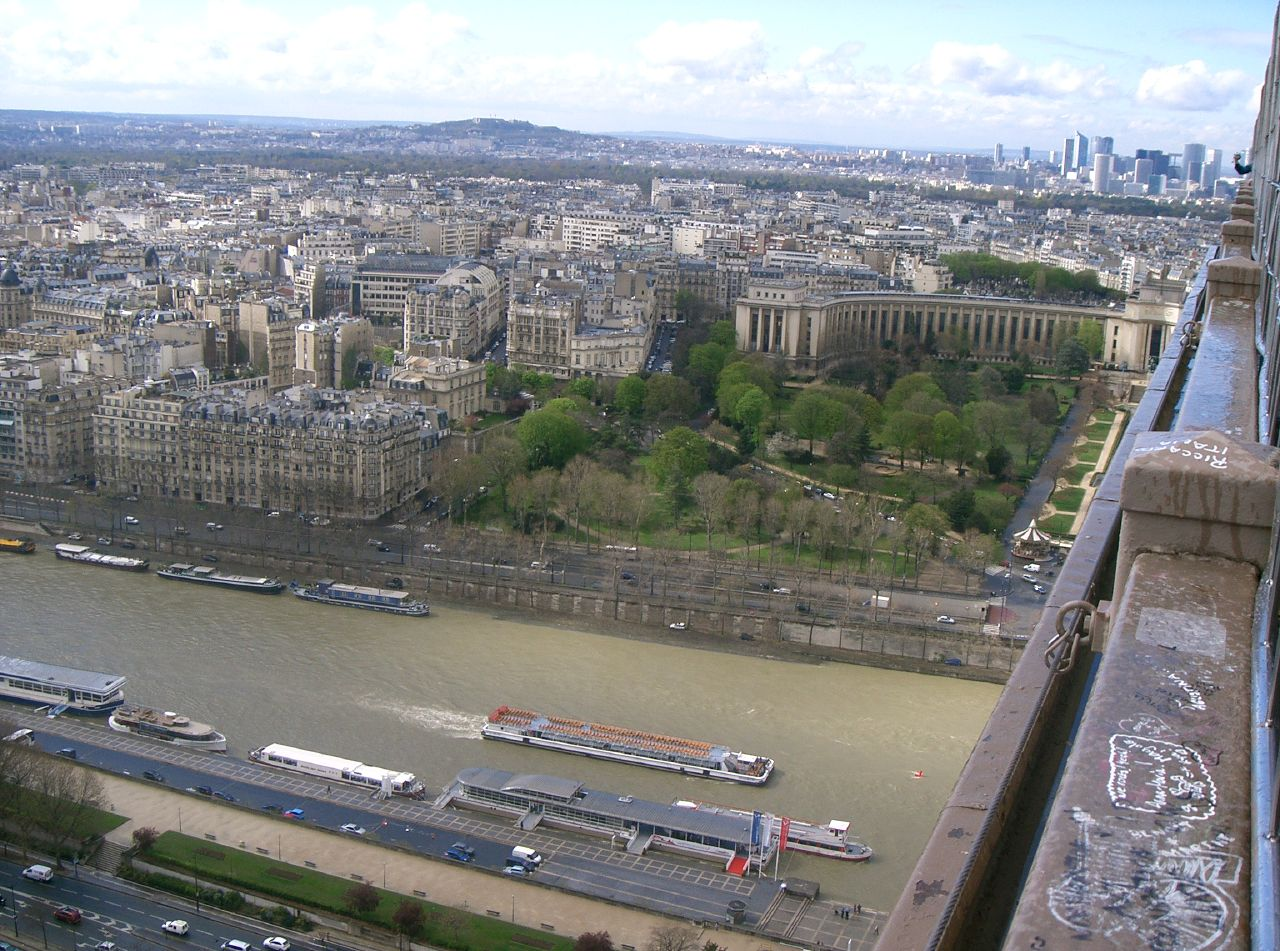
- La Muette
- Interactive map of La Muette
- Country: France
- Region: Île-de-France
- Ville: Paris
- Arrondissement: 16th

Area
  - Total: 2.037 km^{2} (0.786 sq mi)

Population (2016)
  - Total: 22,882
  - Density: 46,611/km^{2} (120,720/sq mi)

The Quartier de la Muette is the 62nd of the 80 quarters of Paris, located in the 16th arrondissement.

The Quarters of the 16th arrondissement

== Location ==
The administrative district in the 16th arrondissement of Paris is situated within a bend of the Seine and is bounded by the following streets: to the west and north, the district borders the Hauts-de-Seine department (Allée du Bord de l’Eau, Boulevard Richard Wallace). It reaches the Seine (Avenue de New York, Avenue du Président Kennedy) via the Avenue Henri Mandel, the Allée Maria Callas, and by passing through the Jardins du Trocadéro. To the south, the Quartier d’Auteuil forms the boundary.

== Origin of the name ==
The neighborhood that developed around the Château de la Muette was named after it.

== History ==
The château was frequently used by French kings when they went hunting for roe deer and stags in the nearby Bois de Rouvray. The hunting lodge included a facility for the pack of hounds—referred to in French as a meute. Over time, this term evolved in common usage into muette (meaning "the mute one").

The district actually consists of two parts: in the southwest, a section of the Bois de Boulogne is included within its boundaries, while the inhabited area surrounding the château is situated on the southern slope of the Colline de Chaillot.

== Sightseeing features ==
- Château de la Muette
- Maison de Balzac
- Maison de la Radio et de la Musique

=== Green Gardens ===
- Passy Cemetery
- Jardins du Trocadéro, South Half with a View of the Eiffel Tower
- Jardin du Ranelagh

=== Museums ===
- Musée Clemenceau
- Musée de l'Homme
- Musée du Vin
- Musée Marmottan Monet
- Musée national de la Marine

== Aviation History ==
The history of ballooning began in Europe in 1783 with the paper manufacturers Joseph Michel Montgolfier and his brother Jacques Étienne Montgolfier. Following an initial attempt in Annonay in June 1783, they repeated their endeavor—at the invitation of King Louis XVI—on November 21, 1783, in the gardens of La Muette. The flight that took place that day, carrying the physicist Jean-François Pilâtre de Rozier (1757–1785) and the Marquis d’Arlandes, was the first to be witnessed by members of the royal family as well as the future United States President Benjamin Franklin (1706–1790), who was living in Passy at the time.
