= Adélaïde Gavaudan =

French lyrical artist (1767–1805)

Marie-Françoise-Adélaïde Gavaudan, called Mlle Gavaudan cadette and nicknamed Spinette (1767–1805), was a French operatic soprano.

== Life ==
Gavaudan is the daughter of Denis Gavaudan and Catherine Calmen, a member of the Gavaudan family, which reigns at the Opéra-Comique; sister of Anne-Marie-Jeanne, Jean-Baptiste-Sauveur and Émilie.

In 1780, she was hired with her sister Émilie, by Madame Donvilliers, of the Petits Comédiens de la Muette.

She was a chorister in 1778, at the Académie royale de musique. She already sang important roles, such as that of Angélique in the revival of Roland by Piccinni in October 1782. On 8 July 1782, she made her debut at the Comédie-Italienne, as Mme Saintclair, in La Fausse Magie by Gretry; then as Alix, in Les Trois fermiers de Dezède; as Aline, in la Belle Arsène, but she was not hired by this company.

She was coryphée in 1784, at the Académie Royale de Musique. She became an assistant in 1786. She came to prominence in 1787 with the role of Spinette in Tarare by Salieri, she retained the sobriquet of "Spinette" During the Revolution, she fled Paris for Germany, then returned. In 1793, she remained at the Opéra; as a singing artist, attached to this company at least until 1798.

In 1796, she joined the troupe of the Théâtre Feydeau, where she created Ziméo (Martini, 1800). In 1802, when Feydeau's troupe was combined with that of the Opéra-Comique, she retired from the stage and emigrated to Hamburg.

== Creations ==
At the Académie royale de musique

- 1781: Iphigénie en Tauride, tragédie lyrique by Niccolò Piccinni, libretto by Alphonse du Congé Dubreuil, 23 January, as Elise.
- 1782: L'embarras des richesses, comédie lyrique in three acts, libretto by Jean-Baptiste Lourdet de Santerre, 26 November, as Phénice.
- 1783: Didon, tragédie lyrique in three acts by Niccolò Piccinni, libretto by Jean-François Marmontel, 1 December
- 1784: La caravane du Caire, opéra-ballet in three acts by André Grétry, libretto by Étienne Morel de Chédeville, 15 January
- 1784: Diane et Endymion, libretto by Jean-François Espic de Lirou, music by Piccini, 7 September, as l’Amour
- 1784: Chimène, tragédie lyrique française, by Antonio Sacchini, libretto by Guillard, as Elvire
- 1785: Panurge dans L’Ile des Lanternes, by Grétry, libretto by Étienne Morel de Chédeville, 25 January
- 1785: Pénélope, tragédie lyrique in 3 acts, libretto by Jean-François Marmontel; music by Niccolo Piccinni, 9 December, as Minerve.
- 1786: Œdipe à Colone, by Antonio Sacchini, 4 January
- 1786: Phèdre, opera by Jean-Baptiste Lemoyne, libretto by François-Benoît Hoffman, 26 October, as Œnone.
- 1786: Les Horaces, tragédie lyrique in 3 acts, libretto by Nicolas-François Guillard, music by Antonio Salieri, 2 December
- 1787: Alcindor, opéra-féerie in 3 acts, libretto by Marc-Antoine-Jacques Rochon de Chabannes; music by Nicolas Dezède, 17 April
- 1787: Tarare, opera, music by Antonio Salieri, libretto by Pierre-Augustin Caron de Beaumarchais, 8 June, role of Spinette
- 1789: Les Prétendus de Lemoyne, libretto by Marc-Antoine-Jacques Rochon de Chabannes, 2 June
- 1790: Les Pommiers et le Moulin, by Jean-Baptiste Lemoyne, 22 January

At Théâtre Feydeau

- 1800: Ziméo, opéra comique in three acts, by Jean-Baptiste Lourdet de Santerre, music by Martini, 16 October
- 1801: Le locataire, one act opéra comique by Pierre Gaveaux, libretto by Charles-Augustin de Bassompierre, 17 September, as Apolline.

== Sources ==
- Le Ménestrel,
  1872: n°32, 7 July; n°33, 14 July; n°34, 21 July; n°35, 28 July; n°36, 4 August Read online.
- Arthur Pougin, Figures d’Opéra-Comique : Mme Dugazon, Elleviou, la tribu des Gavaudan, Paris, Tresse, 1875, pp. 143–157 Archive.
- Fétis, François-Joseph (1860–1881). Biographie universelle des musiciens et bibliographie générale de la musique. Deuxième édition, tome 3. Paris. p. 428..
- Sylvie Bouissou; Pascal Denécheau; France Marchal-Ninosque (2019). Dictionnaire de l'Opéra de Paris sous l'Ancien Régime;(1669–1791). Dictionnaires et synthèses (in French). Vol. II – D-G. Paris: Classiques Garnier. p. 935.
- Kutsch, Karl-Josef; Riemens, Leo (22 February 2012). Großes Sängerlexikon (in German). Walter de Gruyter. ISBN 978-3-598-44088-5.
