= Louise Swanton Belloc =

French writer and translator (1796–1881)

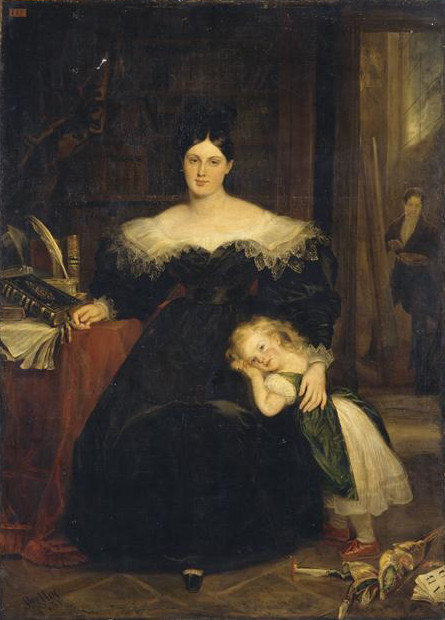
- Born: Anne-Louise Chassériau Swanton; 1 October 1796; La Rochelle
- Died: 6 November 1881 (aged 85)
- Resting place: La Celle-Saint-Cloud
- Known for: translation of Uncle Tom's Cabin

Louise Swanton Belloc (née Anne-Louise Chassériau Swanton; 1 October 1796 – 6 November 1881) was a French writer and translator of Irish descent best known for introducing a number of important works of English literature to France. She is also remembered as a strong proponent of women's education, and was awarded a gold medal by the Institut in her twenties for her literary accomplishments. Marc-Antoine Jullien de Paris, the distinguished founder of the Revue encyclopédique (for which Swanton wrote), once referred to her as "a young person of brilliant talents".

== Life ==
Swanton, one of four children, was born in La Rochelle on 1 October 1796 to James Swanton (an Irish officer in the French service) and Marguérite-Louise-Joséphine Chassériau at her mother's ancestral home. Her parents ensured that she received an excellent education as a child, with a particular focus on English language and literature. Swanton began writing at seventeen, and her first translation — Patriarches, ou la terre de Chanaan (Patriarchal Times, or the Land of Canaan) by Adelaide O'Keeffe — was published in 1818. Shortly thereafter, she was engaged to write for the Revue encyclopédique, encouraged and mentored by its editor and founder Jullien, who praised her "compassionate zeal for the unfortunate".

In 1821, despite the protestations of her father (who considered the Bellocs too bourgeois), Swanton married the French painter Jean-Hilaire Belloc, with whom she had two daughters (Louise, 1822–1895, and Adelaide, 1828–1897) and a son (Louis, 1830–1872). Her son would later marry Bessie Rayner Parkes, a prominent English feminist and personal friend of Swanton's, and have two children, who became prolific writers in their own right: Marie Adelaide Belloc Lowndes (a novelist) and Hilaire Belloc (a poet and historian).

Within Swanton's large circle of acquaintances were to be found such prominent figures as Charles Dickens, Harriet Beecher Stowe, Victor Hugo, Emile Souvestre, Stendhal, Mary Elizabeth Mohl, Barthélemy St Hilaire, Lamartine, and Maria Edgeworth. She amassed a significant correspondence over her life, though much was damaged or destroyed during the Franco-Prussian War.

Some of her most notable literary translations include Stowe's Uncle Tom's Cabin, Elizabeth Gaskell's Cranford, four works by Dickens (who was also a personal friend), Oliver Goldsmith's The Vicar of Wakefield, the works of Walter Scott, Thomas Moore's Irish Melodies, the memoirs of Byron, and a great number of Edgeworth's works. She herself authored over forty books, including a life of Byron that was published with an introduction by Stendhal, and, in collaboration with Edgeworth, a series of early reading books for French children.

Swanton often collaborated on her projects with her close friend Adelaide de Montgolfier, daughter of the famous aeronaut Jacques-Étienne Montgolfier. Shortly after the July Revolution of 1830, Swanton is said to have been engaged by the French government to help General Lafayette establish public libraries in France, but the plan was never brought to fruition. Instead, she and Montgolfier created what the latter called a "choice circulating library" for "sound and healthy reading", geared in particular towards young women and designed to "develop and enkindle the soul, enlighten the mind, and vivify and direct the imagination". The pair also founded La Ruche, journal d'études familière, a monthly magazine dedicated to the education of young women, and co-authored a number of children's books.

After Swanton's death on 6 November 1881, she was buried alongside Montgolfier (and her son, Louis Belloc) at La Celle-Saint-Cloud, France, location of the Swanton-Belloc family home.

== Partial list of works ==
=== Original works ===
- Petit Manuel de morale élémentaire, à l'usage des enfants, contenant douze leçons et trois histoires, avec des séries de questions propres à exercer la mémoire et l'intelligence des enfants. Paris, L. Colas, 1819
- Bonaparte et les Grecs. Paris, Urb. Canel, 1826
- Bibliothèque de famille, ou Choix d'instructions familières sur la religion, la morale, les éléments des connaissances le plus utiles, l'industrie et les arts. Paris, Arth. Bertrand & L. Colas, décembre 1822, 24 issues. [periodical]
- Lettres écrites de Bretagne. Nantes, May 1831 (in the Revue de Paris, vol. XXVII, 1831)
- Contes aux jeunes filles: Simple Suzanne, ou la Reine de mai. Paris, Hachette, 1834
- Corbeille de l'année: Première saison, mélodie du printemps, par Adelaide Montgolfier, avec recueil de mélodies notées. Paris, rue de l'École de Médecine, 1835 [with Adelaide de Montgolfier]
- La Ruche, journal d'études. Paris, rue de l'École de Médecine,1836 [founder and editor, with Adelaide de Montgolfier] [periodical]
- Pierre et Pierrette. Paris, rue de l'École de Médecine, 1838, 1839

=== Translations ===
- Les Patriarches, ou la Terre de Chanaan, histoire en tableaux, tirée des saintes Écritures, by Adelaide O'Keeffe. Paris, Chassériau et Hécart, 1818, 2 vol.
- Petits Coutes moraux, à l'usage des enfants, by Maria Edgeworth. Paris, A. Eymery and L. Colas, 1821, 2 vol.
- Les Amours des anges, et les mélodies irlandaises", by Thomas Moore. Paris, Chassériau, 1823, 2 vol.
- Lord Byron. Paris, A.-A. Renouard, 1824–5, 3 vol.
- Petite Galerie morale de l'enfance, by Maria Edgeworth. Paris, A. Eymery, 1825, 4 vol.
- Grandes routes et chemins de traverse, ou Contes recueillis dans les provinces françaises, par un Irlandais voyageant à pied, by Thomas Colley Grattan. Paris, A. -A. Renouard, 1825, 3 vol.
- Les jeunes industriels, ou Découvertes, expériences, conversations et voyages de Henry et Lucie, by Maria Edgeworth. Paris, Fortic, 1826, 4 vol.
- Éducation familière, ou Séries de lectures pour les enfants, depuis le premier âge jusqu'à l'adolescece, by Maria Edgeworth. Paris, Alex. Mesnier, 1828–34, 12 vol. (in six parts)
- La maison d'Aspen, tragédie, by Walter Scott. Keepsake français, 1830.
- Mémoires de lord Byron, published by Thomas Moore. Paris, Alex. Mesnier, 1830–31, 5 vol.
- Scènes populaires en Irlande, by Schiel (in the Revue éncyclopedique, vol. 46). Paris, Sédillot bros. & Dondey-Dupré, 1830
- Journal d'une expédition entreprise dans le but d'explorer le cours de l'embouchure du Niger, ou Relation d'un voyage sur cette rivière, depuis Yaouric jusqu'à son embouchure, by Richard and John Lander. Paris, Paulin & A. Bertrand, 1832, 5 vol.
- Hélène, by Marie Edgeworth. Paris, Ad. Guyot, 1834, 3 vol.
- Grave et gai: rose et gris, by Anne Fraser Tytler. Paris, L. Janet, 1837, 2 vol. [with Adelaide de Montgolfier]
- Le vicaire de Wakefield, by Oliver Goldsmith. Paris, Charpentier, 1839
- La case de l'Oncle Tom, by Harriet Beecher Stowe. Paris, Charpentier, 1853
