= Adélaïde de Montgolfier =

French author and translator

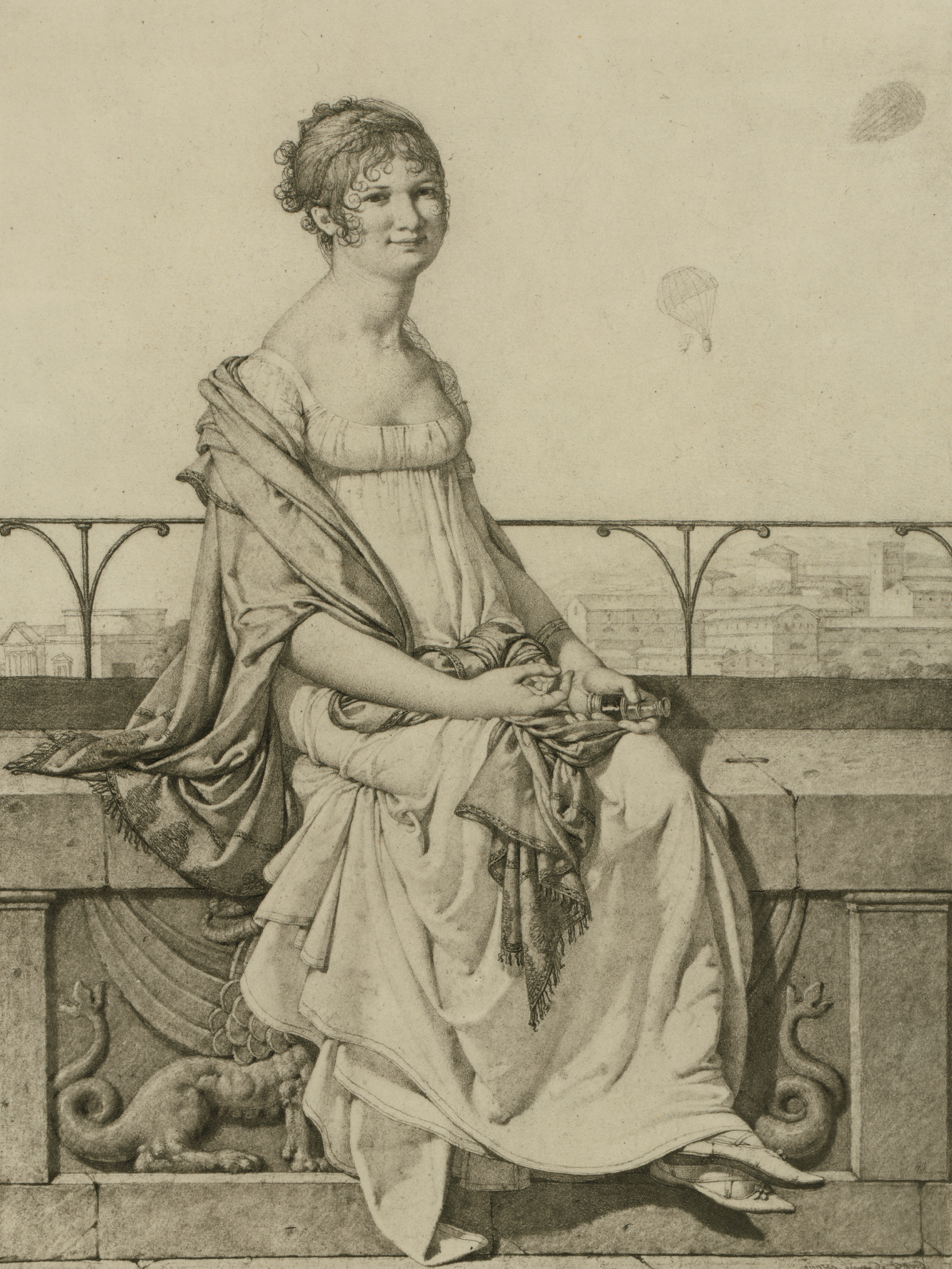
- Born: November 21, 1787 or 1789; Davézieux, France
- Died: December 16, 1880; 2nd arrondisement, Paris, France
- Resting place: La Celle St Cloud
- Occupations: Author, English—French translator
- Father: Jacques-Étienne de Montgolfier

Adélaïde de Montgolfier (21 November 1787 or 1789 — 16 December 1880) was a French author and translator, as well as the daughter of Etienne de Montgolfier. Her most well-known translation is the French-language version of Uncle Tom's Cabin, which she collaborated on with her friend Louise Swanton.

== Early life ==
Adélaïde de Montgolfier was born on 21 November 1787 (although, according to some accounts, 1789) in Davézieux, France to the inventor Etienne de Montgolfier and Adélaïde Bron.

She was close friends with Louise Swanton Belloc, a French writer and translator like herself. Most likely, the two met in Annonay in the 1820s. Over the course of their friendship, Louise and Adélaïde exchanged many letters and collaborated on English to French translations.

In addition to Louise Swanton, Montgolfier was involved in intellectual Parisian circles, leading her to become friends with other contemporary writers like Bianca Milesi, Emma Willard, and Maria Weston Chapman. Montgolfier was a notable salonierre, with her salons reportedly being frequented by contemporaries such as Victor Hugo, Barthelemy-Saint-Hillaire, and Charles Dickens.

== Literary career ==
In May 1830, Montgolfier published an article on Goya in the Revue encyclopédique under the name "Ad.M.". Swanton and Montgolfier edited and directed La Ruche, an educational journal for young adults.

=== Translation ===
As a translator from English into French, Montgolfier published many works, most notably the French-language version of Uncle Tom's Cabin (a collaboration with Louise Swanton). However, Swanton and Montgolfier's 1853 translation of Uncle Tom's Cabin was not the first into French. An earlier translation to French by Émile de Bedolliere was disliked by the original author, Harriet Beecher Stowe, who requested that the duo translate her work instead, and after its completion, Stowe reportedly claimed their version was the best French translation of her novel. Critics of the translation claimed that Swanton and Montgolfier were more faithful to Harriet Beecher Stowe's voice than Bedolliere. According to some accounts, their translation was aided by their friend and American abolitionist Maria Weston Chapman.

== Later life and legacy ==
In 1854, Montgolfier donated 5 francs for the Boston Anti-Slavery Bazaar, organized in part by Chapman.

Montgolfier remained in Paris during the 1870-1871 Siege of Paris, writing to Swanton about her experience.

Montgolfier passed away on 16 December 1880 in the 2nd arrondissement of Paris, and was buried in La Celle St Cloud, the same place her life-long friend Louise Swanton would be buried a year later.

== Selected works ==
- Piccolissima, mid-19th century, translated to English by Eliza Lee Cabot Follen
- La case de l'oncle Tom, (1853), French translation of Uncle Tom's Cabin with Louise Swanton
- Contes devenus histoires (1838)
- Jeux et leçons en images (1855)
- Mélodies du Printemps (1869)
