= Jean-Hilaire Belloc =

French painter (1786–1866)

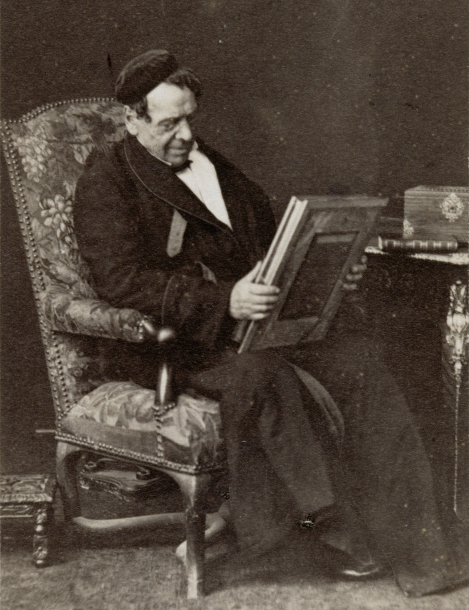

Jean-Hilaire Belloc (French pronunciation: [ʒɑ̃ ilɛʁ bɛlɔk]; 27 November 1786 in Nantes – 9 December 1866 in Paris) was a French painter.

== Life ==
Belloc was a student in the studio of Antoine Gros then of Jean-Baptiste Regnault. He won a medal at the 1810 Paris Salon for his Death of Gaul, friend of Ossian.

He was professor of drawing at the l'École-de-Médecine. He was made a Chevalier of the Legion of Honour in 1864. A bust of him was placed in the cimetière du Père Lachaise in November 2006.

== Family ==
On 2 June 1821 he married Louise Swanton, an accomplished writer and translator of English literature into French. Their son, Louis, would later marry Bessie Rayner Parkes, a prominent English feminist who remained a close personal friend of Swanton's long after the premature death of her husband. Louis Belloc and Parkes had two children who became writers: Marie Adelaide Belloc Lowndes and Hilaire Belloc.

== Works ==
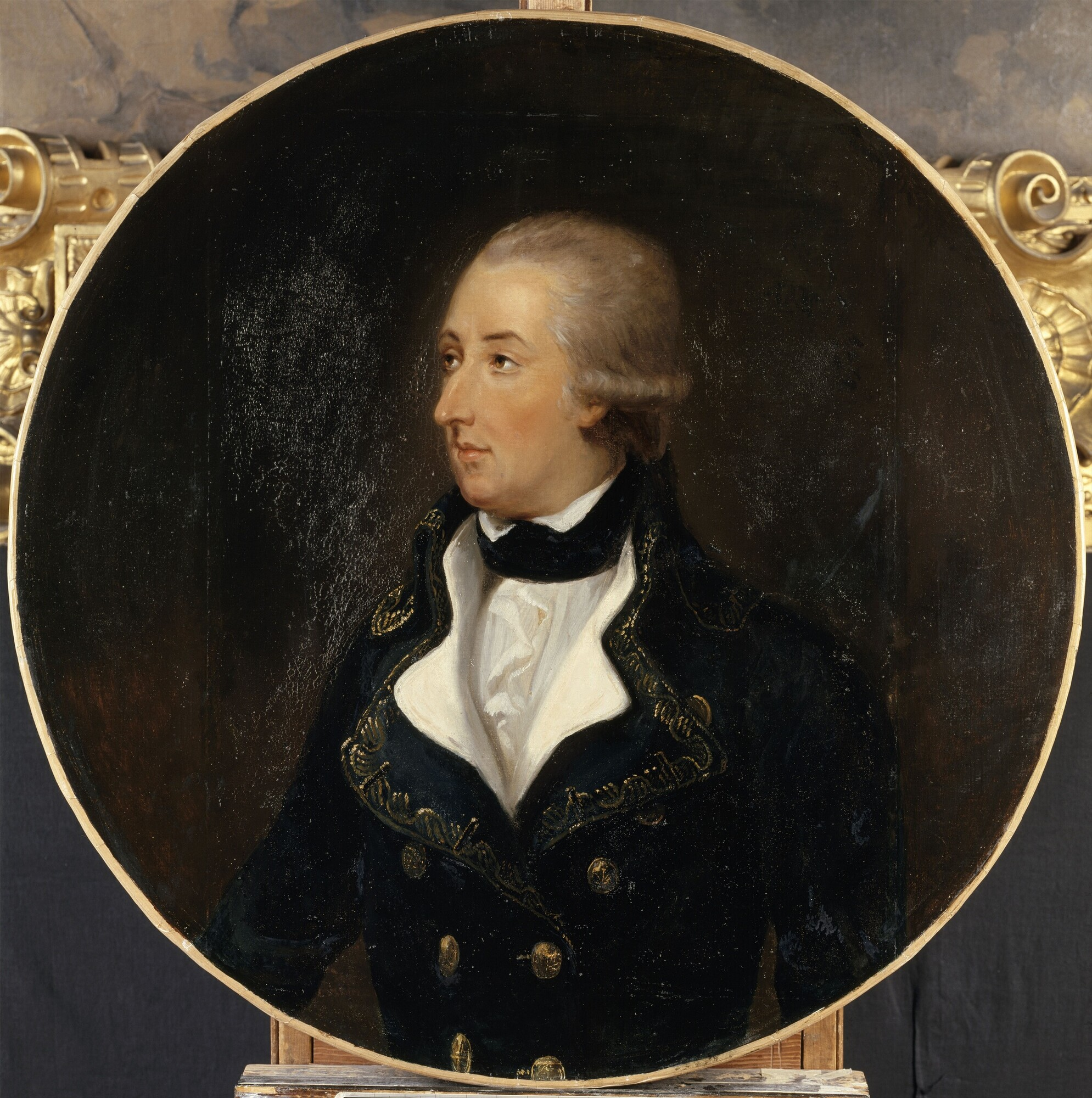
Arthur Dillon, by Jean-Hilaire Belloc

- Death of Gaul, friend of Ossian, 1810
- The Flight into Egypt, 1812
- The Resting of the Holy Family, 1831
- Madame Belloc, His Daughter and the Painter, 1831 (Louvre)
- Portrait of Arthur Dillon, 1834 (museum of Versailles), right
- Death of Saint Louis, 1838
- Portrait of a lady in a chapeau-cloche, (Musée Magnin Dijon)
