= Jean-François Pilâtre de Rozier =

French pioneer balloonist (1754–1785)

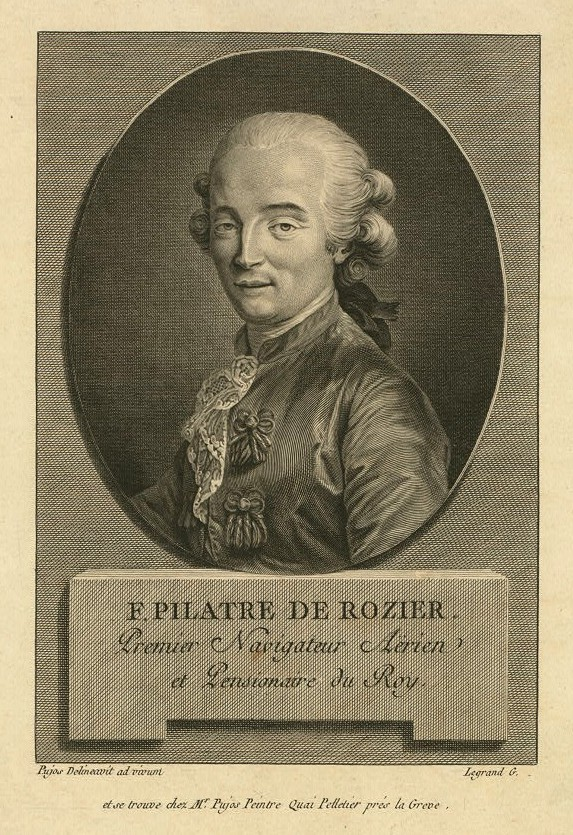
- Born: 30 March 1754; Metz, France
- Died: 15 June 1785 (aged 31); Wimille, France
- Scientific career
- Fields: Chemistry, Physics

Jean-François Pilâtre de Rozier (French pronunciation: [ʒɑ̃ fʁɑ̃swa pilɑtʁ də ʁozje]) (30 March 1754 – 15 June 1785) was a French chemistry and physics teacher, and one of the first pioneers of aviation. He made the first crewed free balloon flight, and first confirmed human flight of any kind, with François Laurent d'Arlandes on 21 November 1783, in a Montgolfier balloon. He later died when his balloon crashed near Wimereux in the Pas-de-Calais during an attempt to fly across the English Channel. He and his companion Pierre Romain thus became the first known fatalities in an air crash.

== Early life ==
He was born in Metz, the third son of Magdeleine Wilmard and Mathurin Pilastre, known as "de Rozier", a former soldier who became an innkeeper. His interests in the chemistry of drugs had been awakened in the military hospital of Metz, an important garrison town on the border of France. He made his way to Paris at the age of 18, then taught physics and chemistry at the Academy in Reims, which brought him to the attention of the Comte de Provence, brother of King Louis XVI.

He returned to Paris, where he was put in charge of Monsieur's cabinet of natural history and made a valet de chambre to Monsieur's wife, Madame, which brought him his ennobled name, Pilâtre de Rozier. He opened his own museum in the Marais quarter of Paris on 11 December 1781, where he undertook experiments in physics, and provided demonstrations to nobles. He researched the new field of gases, and invented a respirator.

== Flight pioneer ==
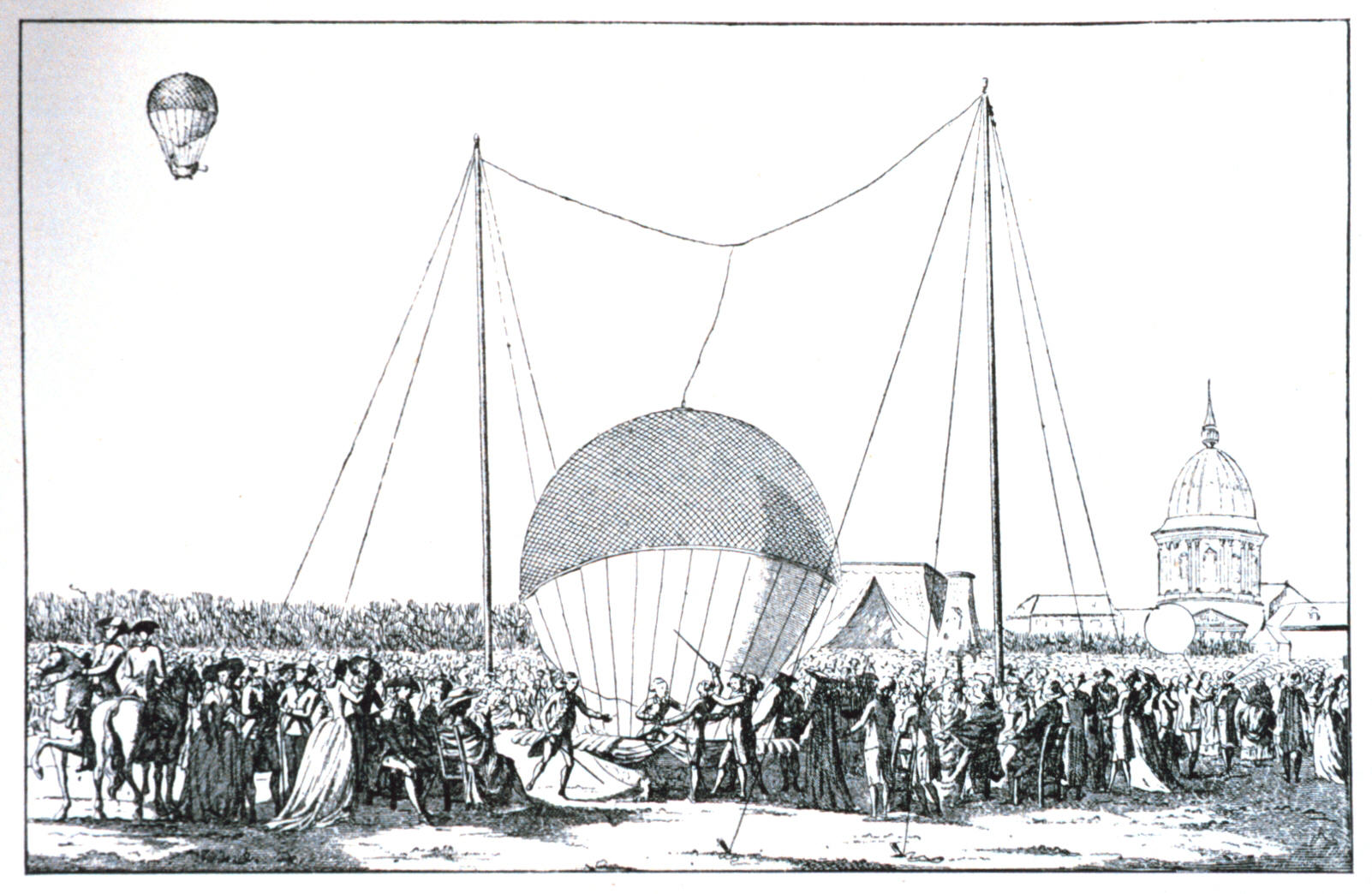
The first tethered balloon ascent on 15 October 1783 by Rozier

In June 1783, he witnessed the first public demonstration of a balloon by the Montgolfier brothers. On 19 September, he assisted with the untethered flight of a sheep, a cockerel, and a duck from the front courtyard of the Palace of Versailles. French King Louis XVI decided that the first manned flight would contain two condemned criminals, but de Rozier enlisted the help of the Duchess de Polignac to support his view that the honour of becoming first balloonists should belong to someone of higher status, and the Marquis d'Arlandes agreed to accompany him. The king was persuaded to permit d'Arlandes and de Rozier to become the first pilots.

After several tethered tests to gain some experience of controlling the balloon, de Rozier and d'Arlandes made their first untethered flight in a Montgolfier hot air balloon on 21 November 1783, taking off at around 2 pm from the garden of the Château de la Muette in the Bois de Boulogne, in the presence of the king. Their 25-minute flight travelled slowly about 5½ miles (some 9 km) to the southeast, attaining an altitude of 3,000 feet, before returning to the ground at the Butte-aux-Cailles, then on the outskirts of Paris.

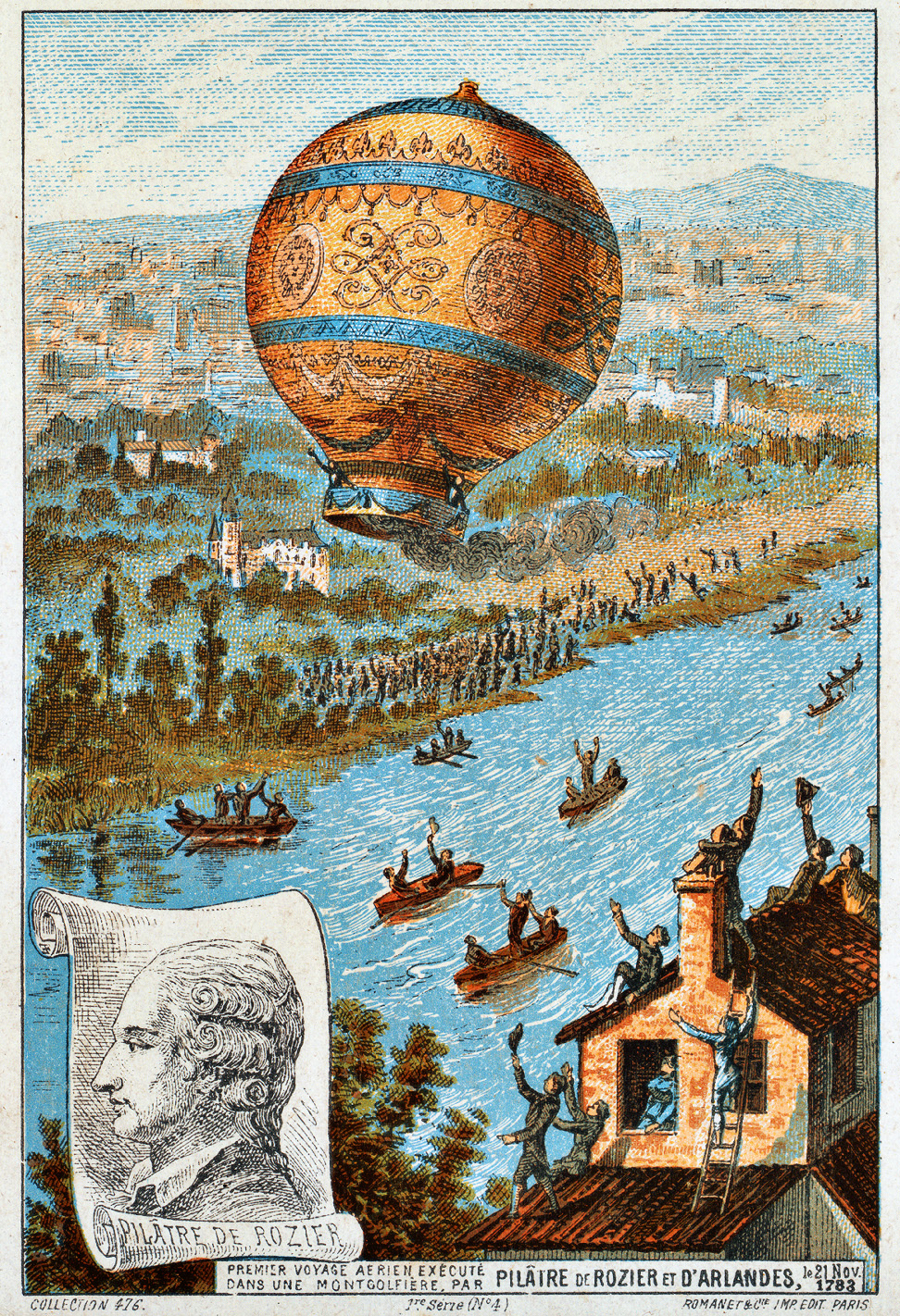
The first untethered balloon flight, by Rozier and the Marquis d'Arlandes on 21 November 1783.

Along with Joseph Montgolfier, he was one of six passengers on a second flight on 19 January 1784, with a huge Montgolfier balloon Le Flesselles launched from Lyon. Four French nobles paid for the trip, including a prince. Several difficulties had to be overcome. The wallpaper used to cover the balloon's envelope became wet because of extreme weather conditions. The top of the balloon was made of sheep- or buckskin. The air was heated by wood in an iron stove: to start, the straw was set on fire with brandy. (In other tests, charcoal or potatoes were used). The balloon had a volume around 23,000 m³, over 10 times that of the first flight, but it only flew a short distance. The spectators kneeled down when the balloon came down too quickly. That evening, the aeronauts were celebrated after listening to Gluck's opera, Iphigénie en Tauride.

Rozier took part in a further flight on 23 June 1784, in a modified version of the Montgolfiers' first balloon christened La Marie-Antoinette after the queen, which took off in front of the King of France and King Gustav III of Sweden. Together with Joseph Proust, the balloon flew north at an altitude about 3,000 metres, above the clouds. They travelled 52 km in 45 minutes before cold and turbulence forced them to descend past Luzarches, between Coye and Orry-la-Ville, near the Chantilly forest. They set records for speed, altitude, and distance travelled.

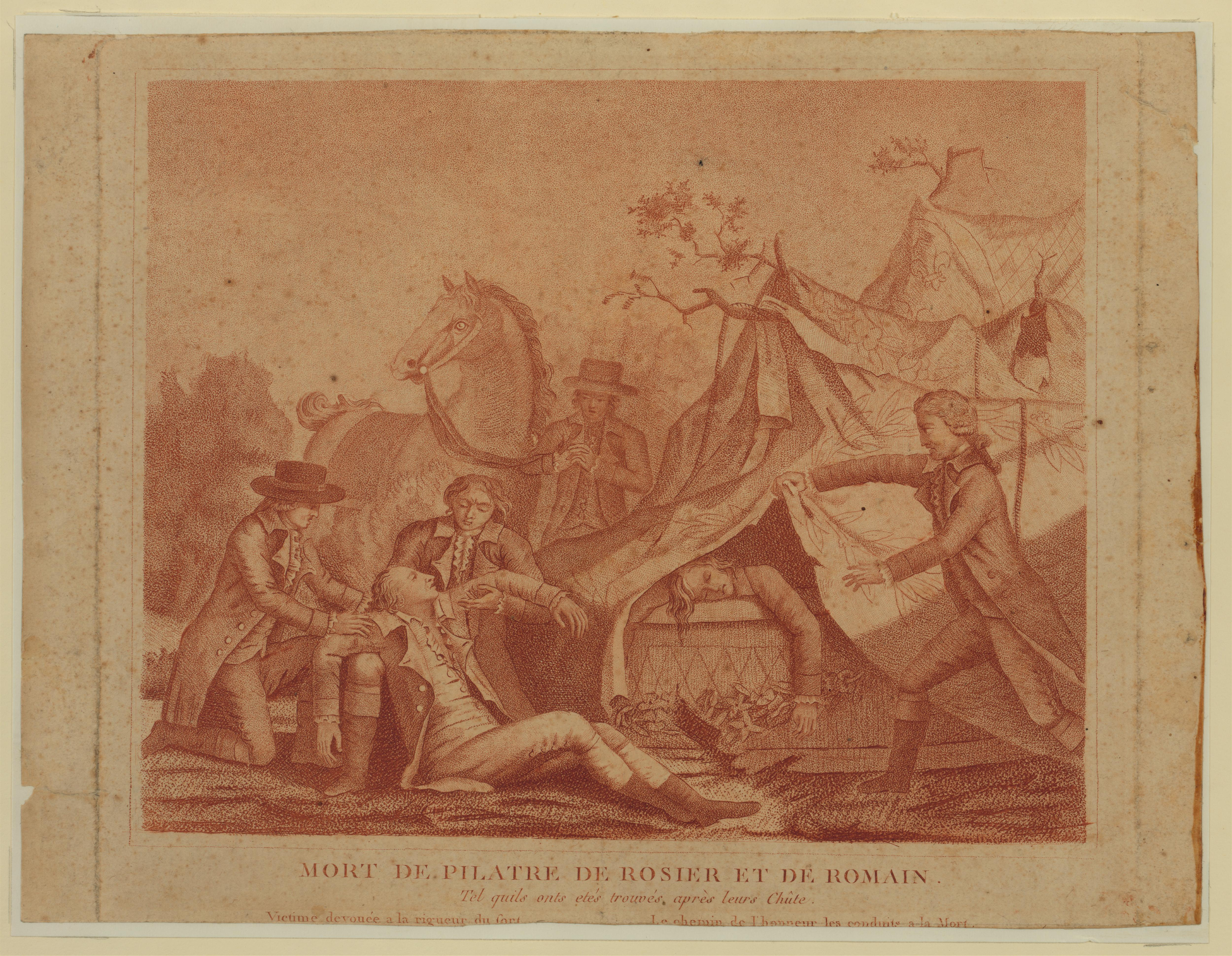
Fatal accident at Wimereux, 15 June 1785.

== Final flight ==
De Rozier's next plan was an attempt to cross the English Channel from France to England. A Montgolfier balloon would not be up to the task, requiring large stocks of fuel for the hot air, so his balloon, the Rozière balloon, was a combination of a hydrogen and hot air balloon. It was prepared in the autumn of 1784, but the attempt was not launched until after another Frenchman, Jean-Pierre Blanchard, and his American companion, Dr. John Jeffries, flew across the channel in a hydrogen gas balloon from England to France on 7 January 1785.

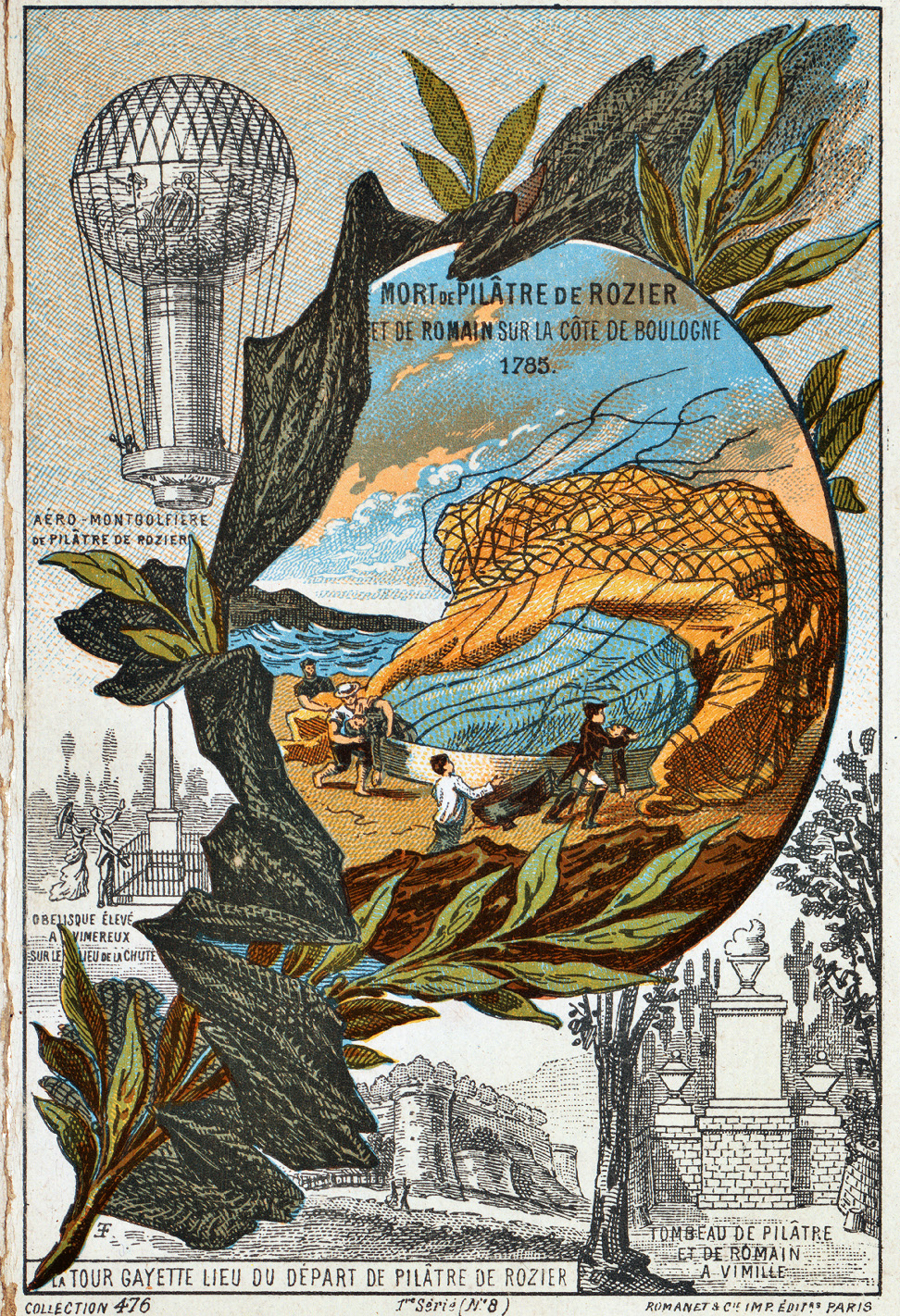
Deaths of Rozier and Romain

Despite several attempts, De Rozier and his companion Pierre Romain were not able to set off from Boulogne-sur-Mer until 15 June 1785. At the take off, a nobleman tried to climb in the balloon with them, but Rozier persuaded him not to, saying it was too dangerous. After making some progress, a change of wind direction pushed them back over land some 5 kilometres (3.1 miles) from their starting point. According to contemporary accounts, the balloon caught fire in midair before suddenly deflating and crashing near Wimereux in the Pas-de-Calais, from an estimated height of 450 m (1,500 ft). Both occupants were killed. Eight days later, his former fiancée died, possibly having committed suicide. A commemorative obelisk was later erected at the site of the crash. The King had a medal struck and gave his family a pension.

The modern hybrid gas and hot air balloon is named the Rozière balloon after his pioneering design.

== See also ==
- List of firsts in aviation
- Timeline of hydrogen technologies
- List of inventors killed by their own inventions
