= Château de la Muette =

OECD headquarters in Paris

Coordinates: 48°51′41″N 2°16′10″E

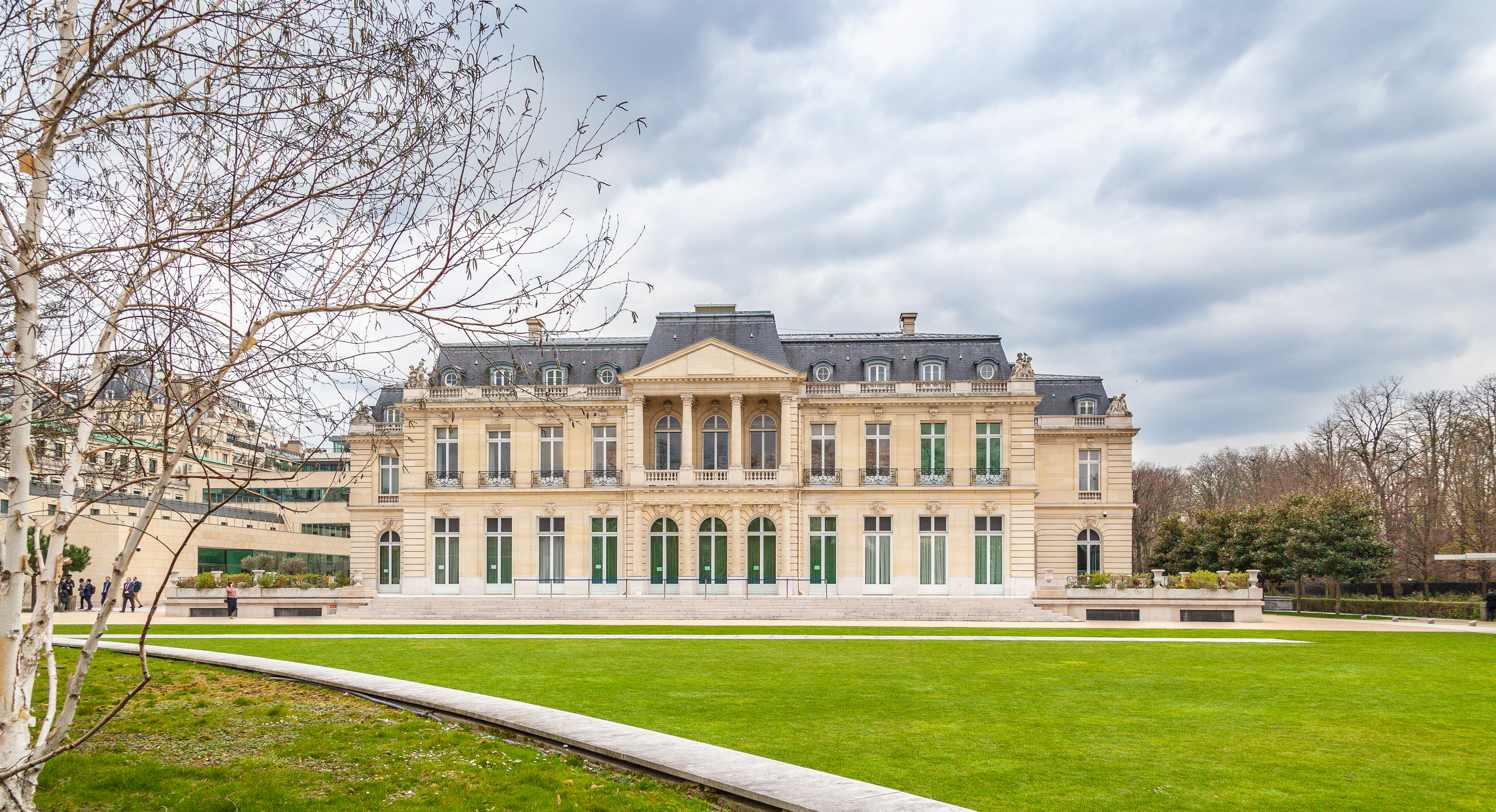
Rothschild's Château, at Château de la Muette, Paris in 2019

The Château de la Muette (French pronunciation: [ʃato də la mɥɛt]) is a château located on the edge of the Bois de Boulogne in Paris, France, near the Porte de la Muette. It is the OECD's headquarters.

Three châteaux have been located on the site since a hunting lodge was transformed into the first château for Princess Marguerite of Valois, favorite daughter of King Henry II, sister of Kings Francis II, Charles IX and Henry III and the first wife of King Henry IV, in the 16th century. The first château was extended and substantially reconstructed by Louis XV. Louis XVI and Marie Antoinette lived at this second château, and the first manned flight, in a hot air balloon, set off from the château in 1783.

The old château was demolished in the 1920s to make room for substantial houses, including a new château built by Henri James de Rothschild, which now serves as the OECD's headquarters.

== Name ==
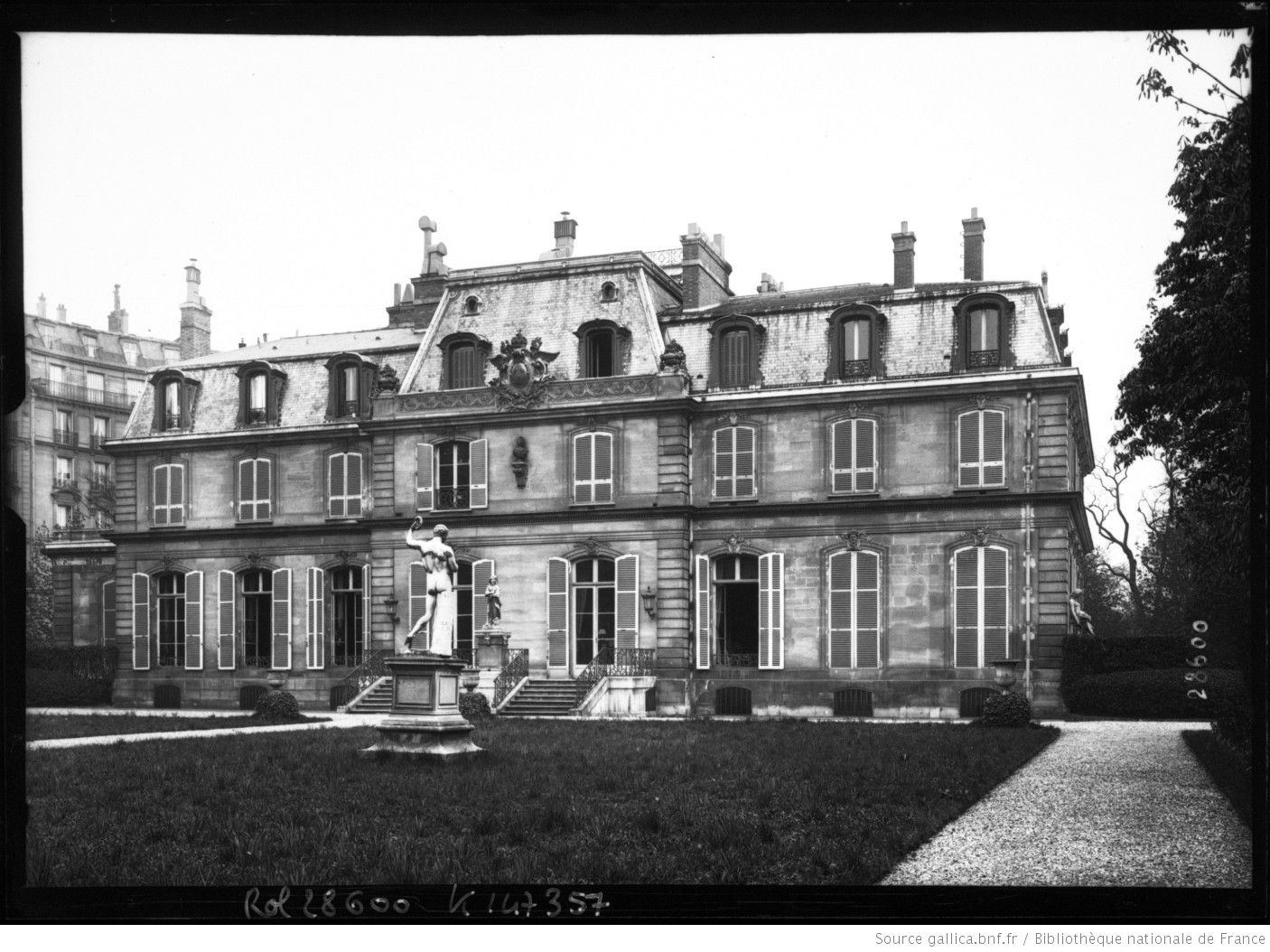
The 18th-century Château de la Muette of Louis XV, photographed in 1900.

The meaning of muette is not certain. In modern French, it denotes a mute woman. However, the name of the château may be derived from several words in the French language:

- muete, a spelling which appears frequently up to the end of the 18th century and signifies a pack of deerhounds;
- mues, the antlers shed by stags in the autumn; or
- mue, the moulting period of hunting hawks (related to the English word mews).

It is clear that the name was connected with the hunting lodge in the Bois de Boulogne, which mediaeval French kings used when they hunted deer in the forest.

== History ==
=== First château ===
Near the end of his reign, Charles IX had a royal hunting lodge on the site transformed into a small château for Marguerite de Valois, later the first wife of Henry IV. Although their marriage was always rocky and eventually annulled, they became friends late in life and she was able to return to Paris and set up house in the château. Marguerite bequeathed her château to the little Dauphin, later Louis XIII, in 1606.

From 1606 to 1792, the property remained part of the royal estates. In 1716, the château became the home of the Duchess of Berry, Marie-Louise Elisabeth d'Orléans, daughter of Philippe II, Duke of Orléans, Regent of France. Antoine Watteau decorated the rooms with chinoiserie. Tsar Peter the Great of Russia visited her here. When welcoming the Russian tsar, the Duchess appeared "stout as a tower" (“puissante comme une tour”). By early July, Madame de Berry, who was by then kept fully secluded in her castle at La Muette. In January 1716, she had secretly borne a girl at her Luxembourg Palace. Unable to recover from a difficult delivery, the Duchess expired on 21 July 1719 in the Château de la Muette

=== Second château ===
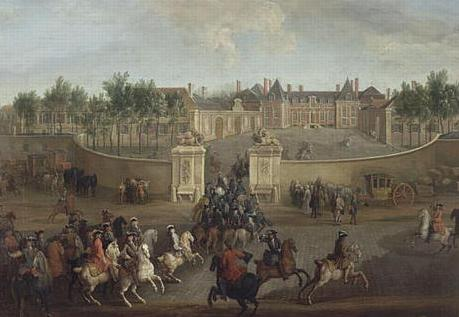
La Muette in the time of Louis XV

On the Duchess of Berry's death in 1719, the château passed to the nine-year-old king, Louis XV. The king used the château to entertain his mistresses, including the three de Nesle sisters, Madame de Pompadour and Madame du Barry.

Louis XV had the château entirely rebuilt by the architects Jacques Gabriel and Ange-Jacques Gabriel between 1741 and 1745. The new, much larger, building was flanked by two large wings with many smaller outlying buildings. The Duke of Berry, later King Louis XVI, took possession of La Muette in 1764, and his future wife, Marie Antoinette, lodged there on her arrival in France.

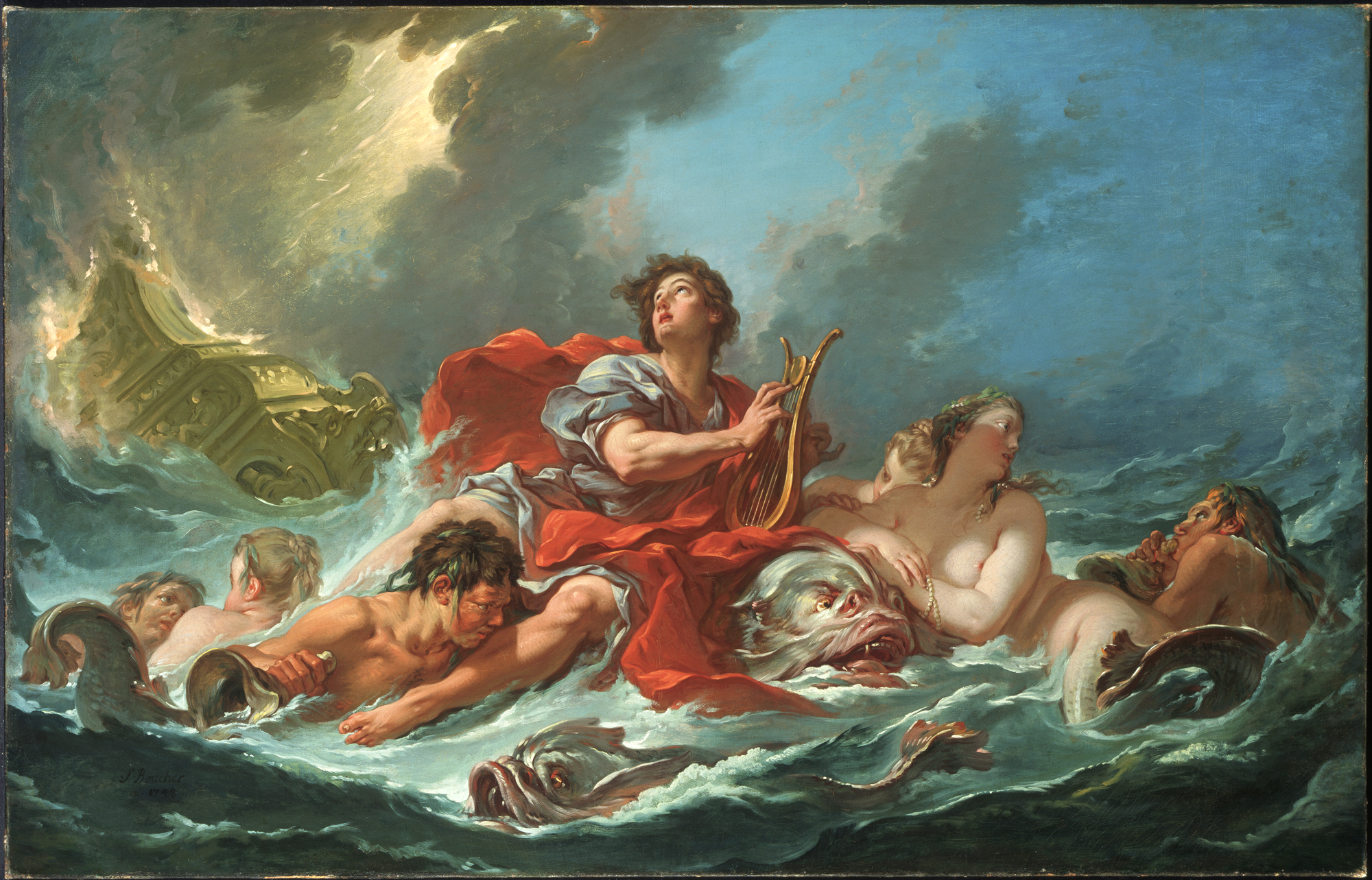
François Boucher, Arion on the Dolphin, 1748, Princeton University Art Museum, intended as an overdoor in the château

=== Louis XVI and Marie-Antoinette ===
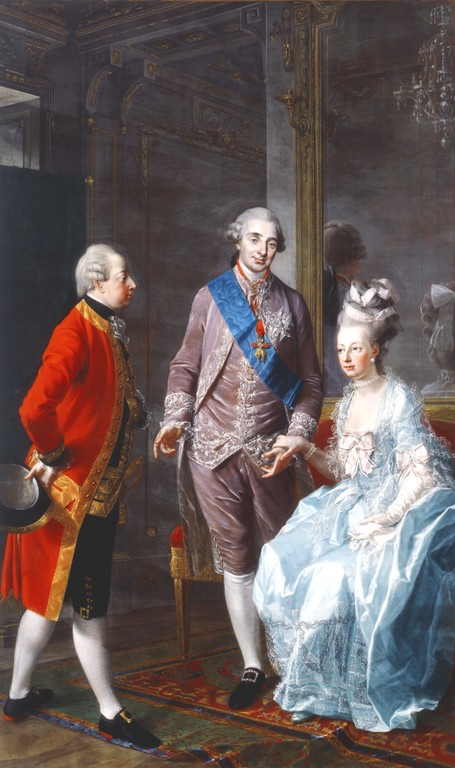
Archduke Maximilian Francis of Austria visits Marie Antoinette and Louis XVI on 7 February 1775 at the Château de la Muette (painting by the Austrian portraitist Josef Hauzinger)

Louis XVI is said to have spent the happiest days of his life at the château with his young bride, although they had no knowledge of sexual matters and thus did not have children for seven years. During this period Louis abolished certain royal taxes, and he opened the gates of the Bois de Boulogne to the populace. The Emperor Joseph II, Marie-Antoinette's brother (travelling incognito under the name of "Count Falkenstein") visited the couple here in April 1777.

Louis granted a small area of sandy ground of the château's estate at les Sablons (near les Sablons metro station) to Antoine-Augustin Parmentier (1737–1813) to demonstrate the growing of potatoes, which had not previously been considered in Europe, other than in Ireland, as safe for human consumption. Indeed, they were considered to be a source of leprosy among other things. Parmentier carried out a series of publicity stunts, which led to the acceptance of potatoes in France and then throughout Europe.

The château, together with the Château de Madrid and other properties, were put on sale in February 1788, with a view to demolition. The castle fell into disrepair, and the main building was demolished in 1793.

=== Montgolfier brothers ===
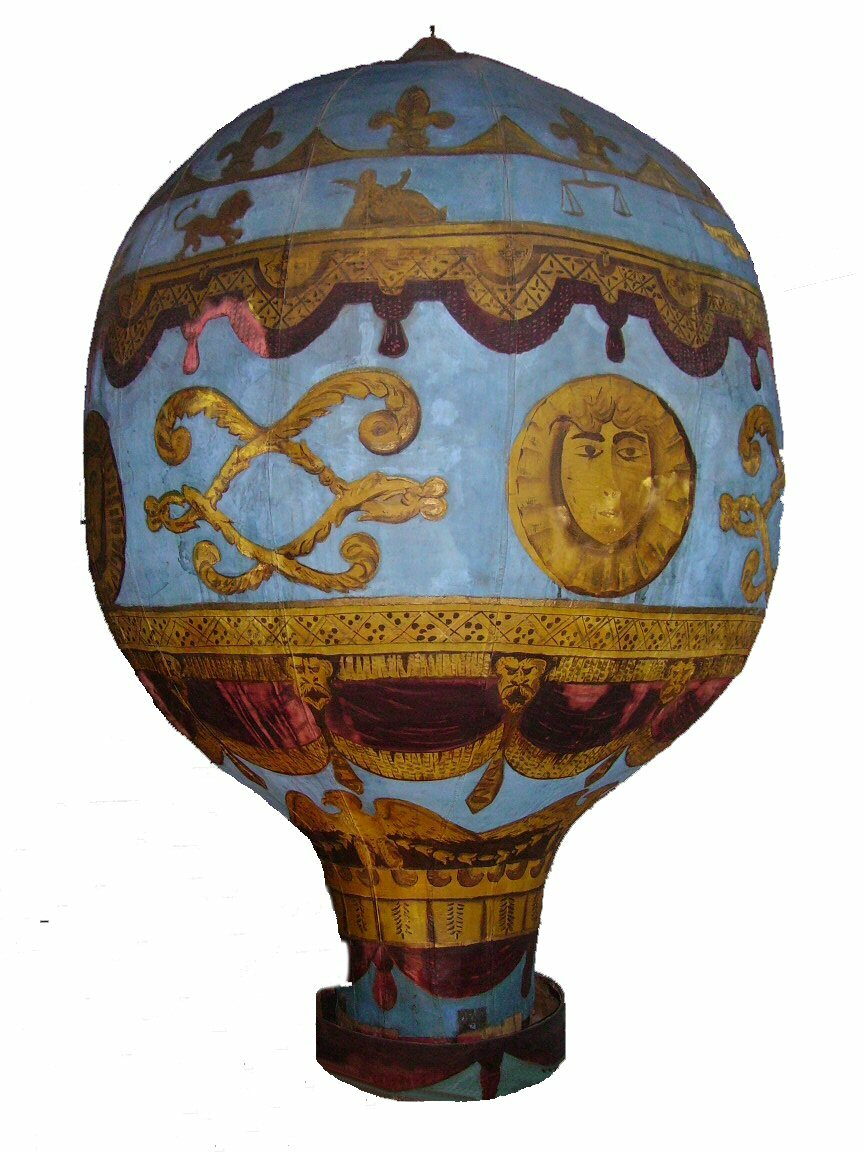
A model of the Montgolfier brothers balloon at the London Science Museum.

The first manned flight commenced from the château on 21 November 1783, with a hot air balloon manufactured by the Montgolfier brothers lifting off from the garden of La Muette carrying Pilâtre de Rozier and the Marquis d'Arlandes. Among the crowd who observed this feat were the royal family and Benjamin Franklin. They flew for 25 minutes, travelling almost 300 metres above Paris and covering a distance of about nine kilometres, before landing between the windmills on the Butte-aux-Cailles. Enough fuel remained on board at the end of the flight to have allowed the balloon to fly four to five times as far. However, burning embers from the fire were scorching the balloon fabric and had to be extinguished with sponges, and so the pilots decided to land as soon as they were over open countryside.

=== Post revolutionary history ===
During the French Revolution, the Château de la Muette became state property. The property was split up into several lots and sold at auction. The château returned to the royal family in 1816. One wing was given to the Minister for Finance, Louis Emmanuel Corvetto. The other wing, and most of the grounds, were purchased in 1820 by Sébastien Érard, who manufactured pianos used by Frédéric Chopin and Franz Liszt. In 1821, Sébastien Érard invented the double escapement action, which permitted a note to be repeated even if the key had not yet risen to its maximum vertical position, a great benefit for rapid playing.

In 1912, the château's then owner, the Franqueville family, sold much of the remaining property, and the former estate developed into a fashionable residential area.

=== Third château ===
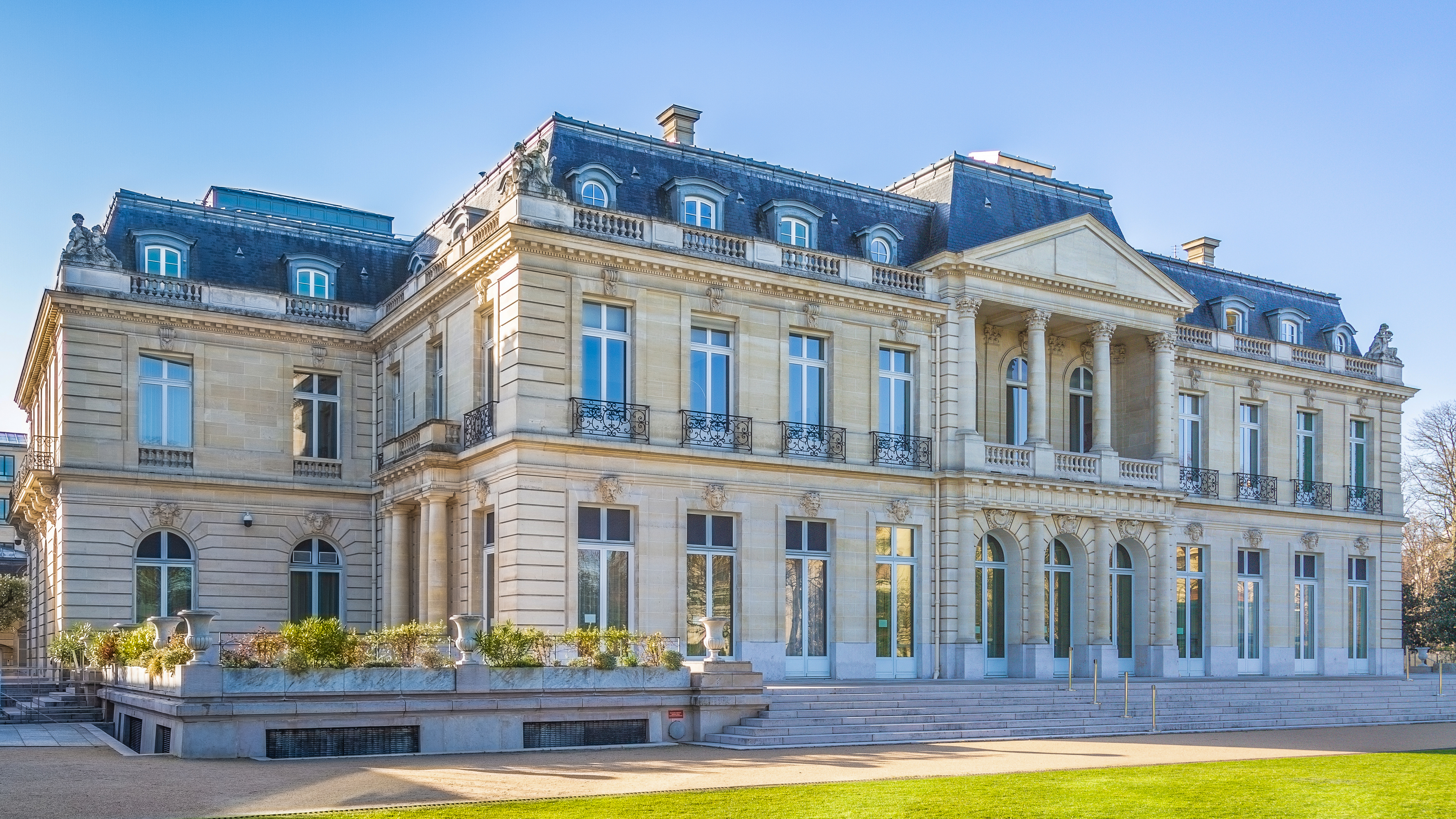
Rothschild's château in 2019

Two large lots were sold to Baron Henri James de Rothschild, who built a new château in 1921 and 1922 as his Paris residence to a 19th-century design by Lucien Hesse. By the beginning of World War II, the old château had been completely demolished and replaced by mansions.

The new château was appropriated by Nazi Germany's Kriegsmarine during the Second World War. During the Liberation of Paris in August 1944, the château was captured after a brief gunfight by the British '30 Assault Unit' keen on gathering vital intelligence. In late 1945 United States Army took over the buildings to organise operations in the aftermath of the war. In 1949, it became the headquarters of the Organization for European Economic Co-operation (OEEC) set up under the Marshall Plan to help administer funds provided by the United States to promote post-war recovery and to encourage European economic cooperation. The OEEC developed into the Organisation for Economic Co-operation and Development in 1961, with the new Château de la Muette as its headquarters.

The "Rue André Pascal" street on which the cour d'honneur of the château opens is named after one of the pseudonyms under which Henri de Rothschild published his literary works.

== See also ==
- List of firsts in aviation
- Pavillon de la Muette
