= François Laurent d'Arlandes =

18th-century French nobleman, soldier, and hot balloon pioneer

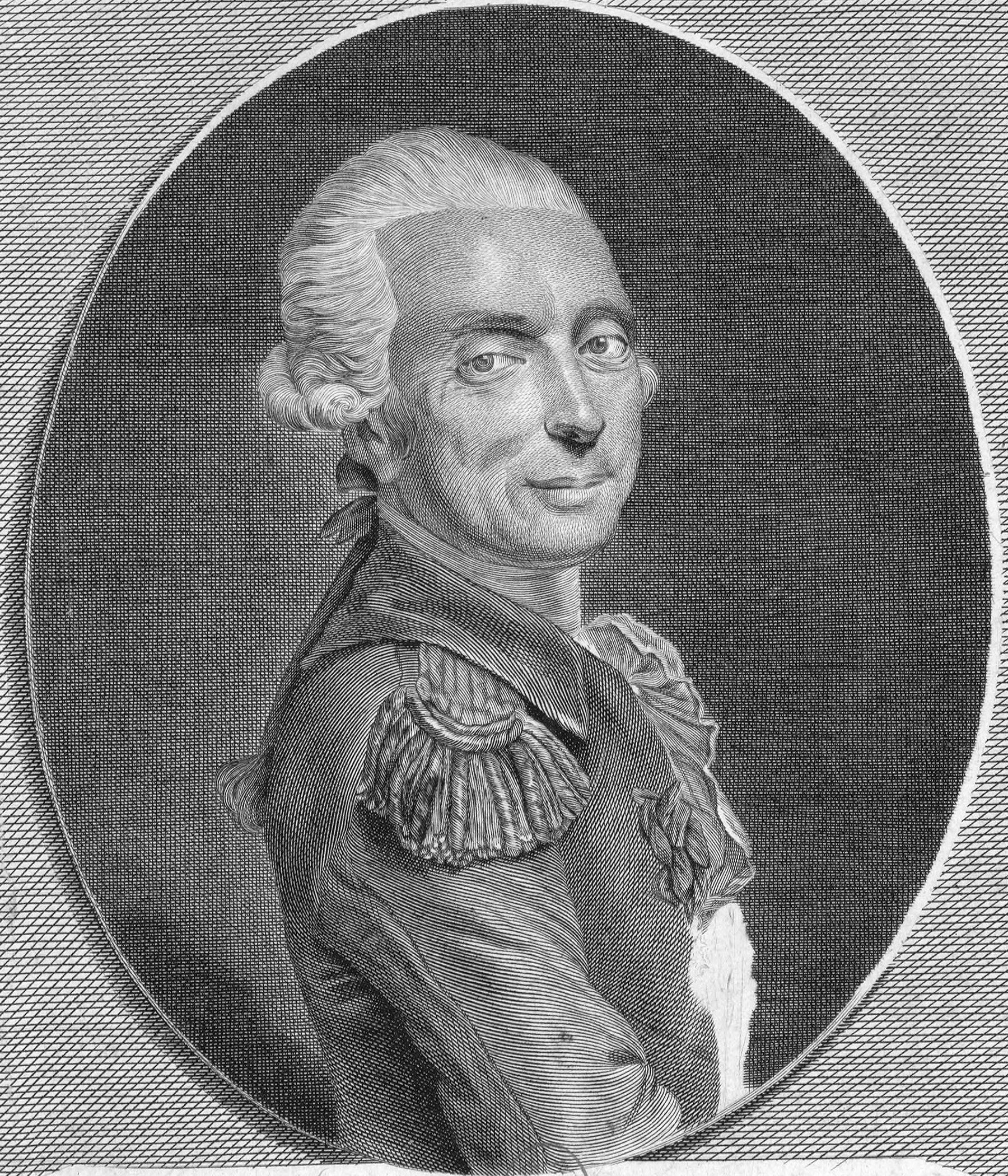
- le marquis d'Arlandes
- Born: 1742
- Died: May 1, 1809 (aged 66–67)

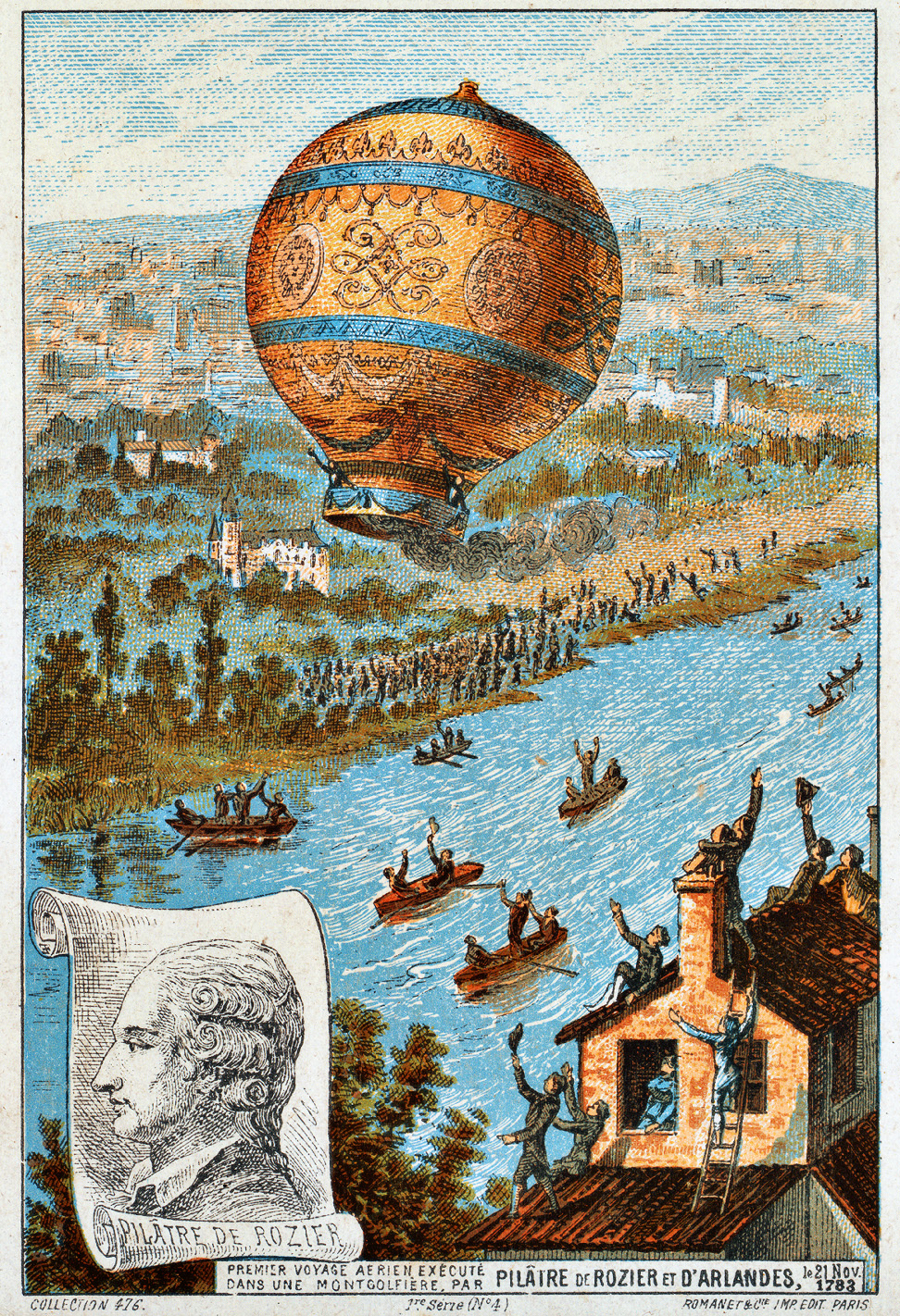
First untethered voyage by Pilâtre de Rozier and d'Arlandes, November 21, 1783. Illustration from the late 19th Century.

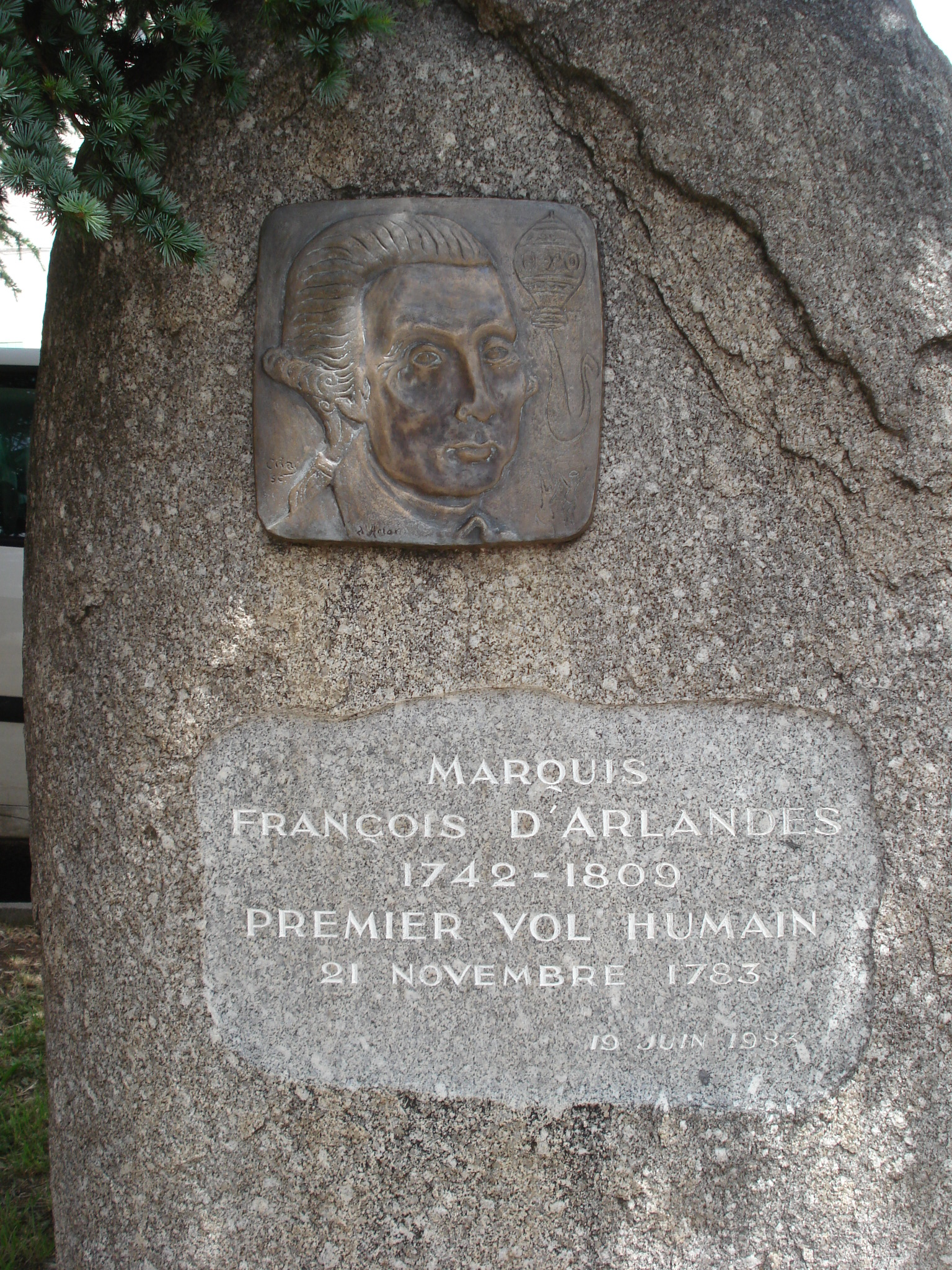
Memorial to François d'Arlandes in Anneyron

François Laurent d'Arlandes (French pronunciation: [fʁɑ̃swa loʁɑ̃ lə vjø daʁlɑ̃d]; 1742 – 1 May 1809) was a French marquis, soldier and a pioneer of hot air ballooning. He and Jean-François Pilâtre de Rozier made the first crewed free balloon flight, and first confirmed human flight of any kind, on 21 November 1783, in a Montgolfier balloon.

D'Arlandes was born in Anneyron in the Dauphiné. He met Joseph Montgolfier at the Jesuit college of Tournon. He became an infantry officer in the French royal guard.

The first public demonstration of a balloon by the Montgolfier brothers took place in June 1783, and was followed by an untethered flight of a sheep, a cockerel and a duck from the front courtyard of the Palace of Versailles on 19 September. The French King Louis XVI decided that the first manned flight would contain two condemned criminals, but de Rozier enlisted the help of the Duchess de Polignac to support his view that the honour of becoming first balloonists should belong to someone of higher status, and d'Arlandes agreed to accompany him. The King was persuaded to permit d'Arlandes and de Rozier to become the first pilots.

After several tethered tests to gain some experience of controlling the balloon, de Rozier and d'Arlandes made their first untethered flight in a Montgolfier hot air balloon on 21 November 1783, taking off at 1:54 p.m. from the garden of the Château de la Muette in the Bois de Boulogne, in the presence of the King. Also watching was U.S. envoy, Benjamin Franklin. Their 25-minute flight travelled slowly about 5½ miles (some 9 km) to the southeast, attaining an altitude of 3,000 feet, before returning to the ground at the Butte-aux-Cailles, then on the outskirts of Paris. After the flight, the pilots drank champagne to celebrate the flight, a tradition carried on by balloonists to this day.

D'Arlandes proposed a flight to cross the English Channel in 1784, but the plan came to nothing.

He was dismissed from the army for cowardice after the French Revolution, and died in his castle of Saleton near Anneyron. Some sources suggest that he committed suicide.

== See also ==
- List of firsts in aviation
