= Par Bricole =

Swedish Bacchanalian society

- P.B.
- Founded: May 16, 1779; 246 years ago Stockholm, Sweden
- Type: Bacchanalian fraternity
- Affiliation: Independent
- Status: Active
- Scope: National
- Chapters: 8 lodges
- Headquarters: Urvädersgränd 3 Stockholm; Sweden
- Website: parbricole.se

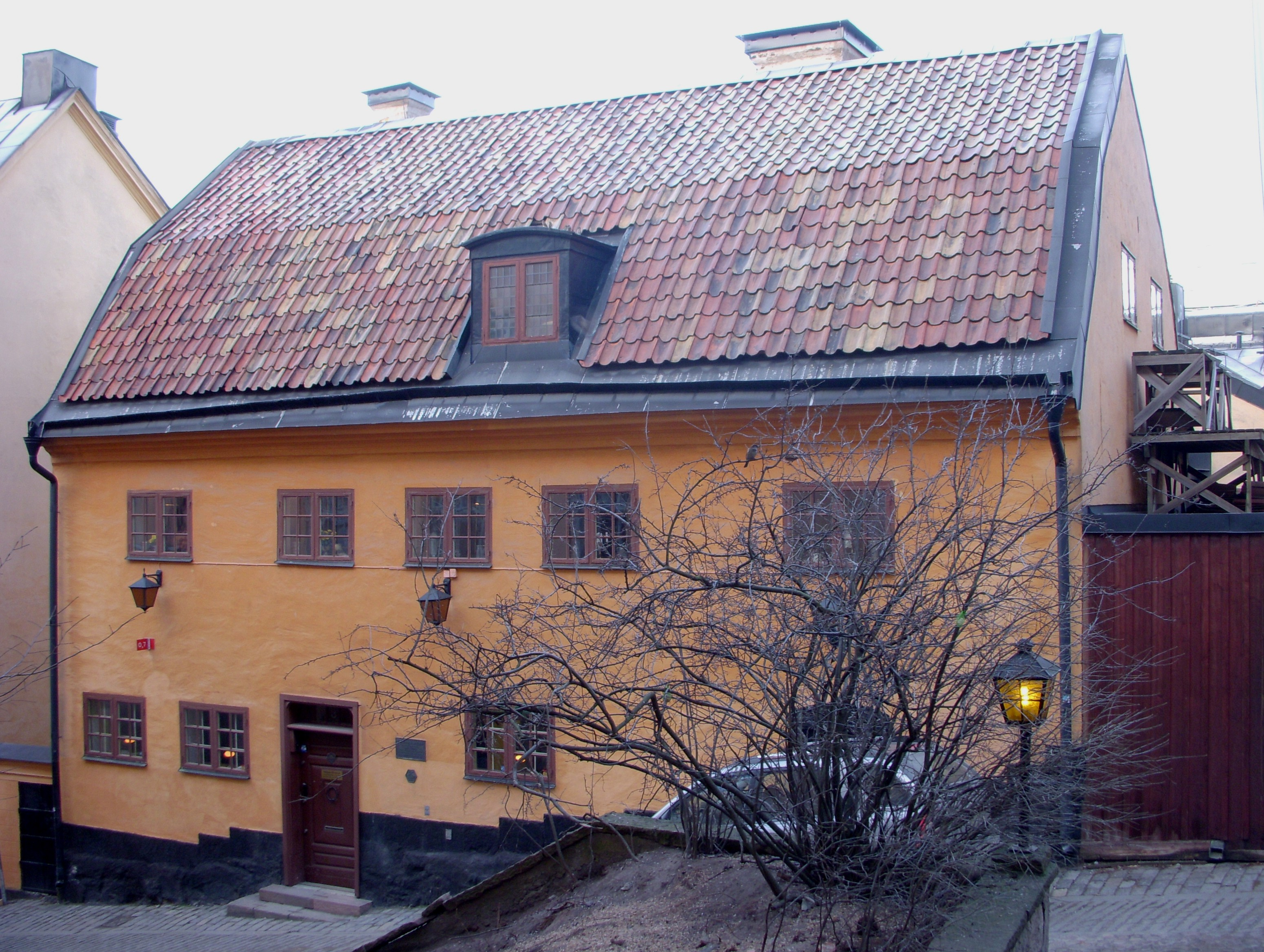
Par Bricole's mother lodge is the Bellman House in Stockholm.

Par Bricole is a Swedish Bacchanalian order society for men only, founded in Stockholm on 15 May 1779 in Källaren Kejsarkronan at Drottninggatan 6. The main sources of inspiration were the Freemasons and Carl Michael Bellman's sayings about Bacchus.

The name Par Bricole comes from a French billiards term, meaning "with bounce". Within the society, it is traditionally and a bit improperly interpreted instead as "by chance", actually "by detours", "indirectly", and is usually abbreviated "P.B."

Par Bricole's mother lodge is still in Stockholm and is housed in the order's "tribal house" Bellmanhuset by Urvädersgränd. The order also has subsidiary lodges in Gothenburg (Göta Par Bricole), Vänersborg, Borås, Malmö, Jönköping, Sundsvall, and Örebro.

== Prehistory ==
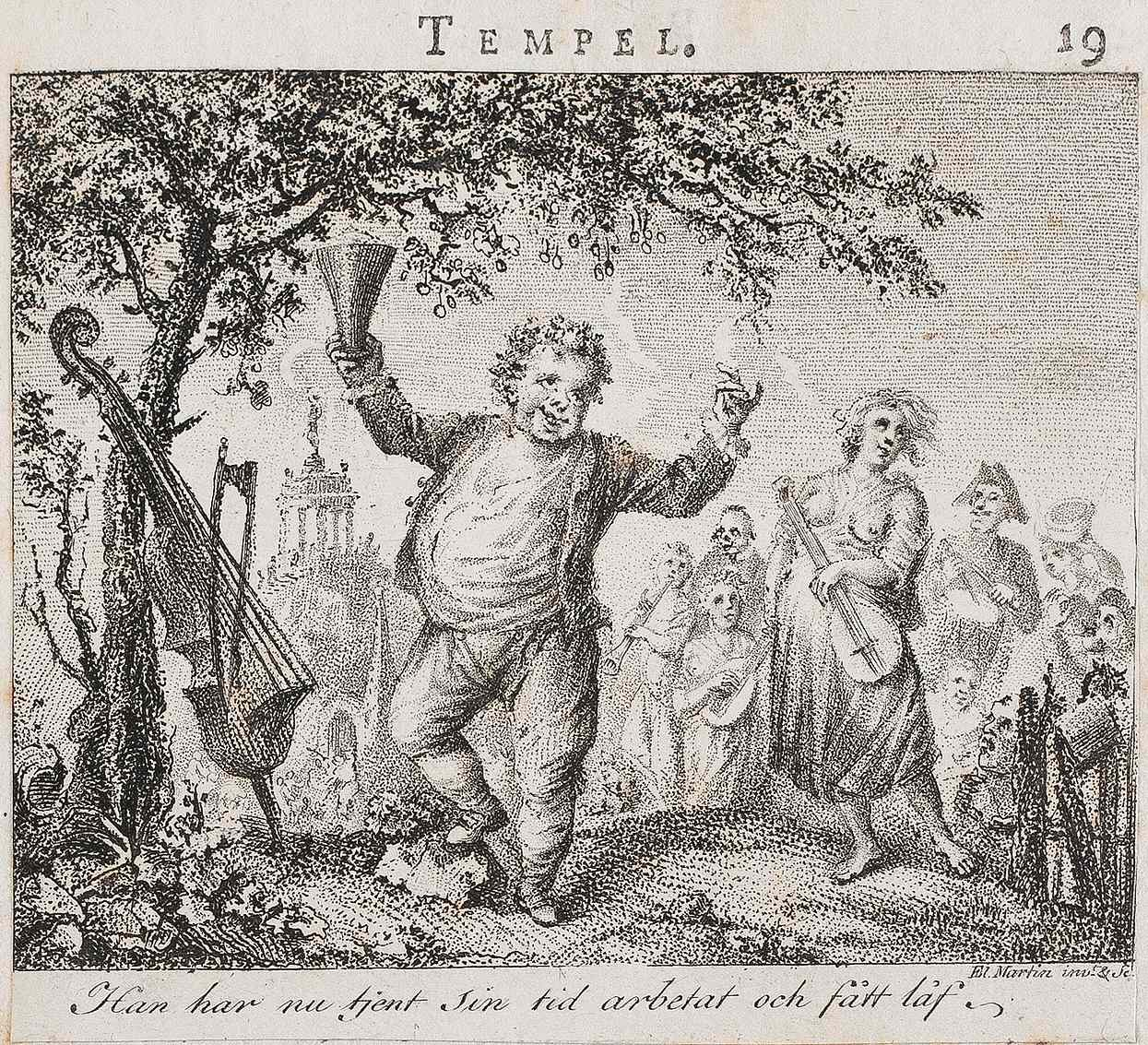
Illustration by Elias Martin of drunken celebrations by the "Order of Bacchus", Par Bricole's precursor, from Carl Michael Bellman's Bacchi Tempel, 1783

The first origin of the society was in a small circle of cheerful associates (among them Carl Israel Hallman), for whom the poet Carl Michael Bellman preferred his parody-humorous Acts concerning the Order of Bacchus, as described in his poems in Bacchi Tempel and his Fredman's Epistles. He seems in part to have intended to have fun both with the pursuit of titles and stars of the order as well as with Freemasonry's mysterious ceremonial nature. Numerous certificates suggest that Bellman established three "knighthoods" by 1774, from which Par Bricole immediately developed. However, the official existence of the society has usually been counted from 1779, when Olof Kexél was summoned and prepared the ritual for several new, higher, degrees. At the same time, Duke Charles of Södermanland (the future Charles XIII) became the patron of the Order.

== Members and lodges ==
Among the members of Par Bricole during the 18th century are such well-known figures as Elis Schröderheim, Nils von Rosenstein, Johan Henrik Kellgren, Johan Gabriel Oxenstierna, Bengt Lidner, Abraham Niclas Edelcrantz, A.A. Stjerncrantz, Johan Magnus Lannerstierna, Olof Åhlström, Francesco Antonio Uttini, Christopher Christian Karsten, Carl Stenborg and Edouard Du Puy. Until his death, Kexél was master of ceremonies and Bellman was the first poet. 1799 takes the second period of the order with the establishment of new offices, among others the office of Grand Master. In 1801 a branch lodge was established in Gothenburg (Göta Par Bricole); since then, such have occurred in Vänersborg (1839), Borås (1860), Malmö (1878), Jönköping (1879), Sundsvall (1985) and Örebro (2017).

== Early 19th century ==
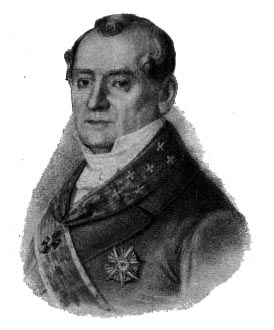
Pehr Westerstrand, Grandmaster 1832-1857, wearing Par Bricole insignia

In the early 19th century, the seriously mysterious, "higher" bricolerie threatened to take over, but from 1820 the words again took a happier turn, and "Nachspiel" or "after parties" were introduced. Among active members at this time are Lars Hjortsberg, archbishop Valerius, J.M. Stjernstolpe, J.V. Berger, J.H. Pettersson, Bernhard Crusell, Franz Berwald, Johann Franz Brendler, Andreas Randel, the Bellman singer Axel Arvid Raab, Lars Adolf Kinmansson, the poet Fredrik August Dahlgren, Clas Livijn, Bernhard von Beskow, Johan Anders Björck, H.M. Munthe, Olof Strandberg and Pehr Westerstrand (Grandmaster 1832-1857). During the 1850s and 1870s, the Royal Swedish Opera's foremost singer took an active part in the order's activities.

== Grandmasters ==
Among the recent grandmasters of the order are the surgeon Professor Carl Jakob Rossander (1892-1900) and the regimental doctor H. Sundberg (1910-1925). The current Grand Master is Henrik Mickos (since 2016). In 1829, Par Bricole celebrated its 50th anniversary, and on July 26 of the same year, Johan Niclas Byströms, who was paid for by the company, unveiled Bellman's bust at Bellmansro in Royal Djurgården. Since then, Bellman's Day (July 26) has been celebrated annually there as a folk festival under the leadership of P.B. The order's feast days are also May 15 and Barbara's Day, December 4 (chosen by Bellman in honour of his grandmother, Barbara Klein; Barbara is usually glorified fantastically as a kind of Dionysian goddess, the "aunt" of all bricolists). In 1874, the order celebrated its 100th anniversary with a festive cantato by Talis Qualis and Ludvig Norman.

== The modern order ==
Par Bricole counts a large number of members united in their interest in the arts of speech, music and theatre. The king of Sweden stands as the protector of the order. The song plays a big role in the company. During its first half-century it was cultivated in the form of the company song; then this has been succeeded by the quartet and later the choir. Par Bricole has an excellent choir, and its leaders have been Frans Preumayr (1832–1853), Eduard Brendler and (1853–1862) Andreas Randel, who both composed the company's ceremonial choirs, during the 1860s August Söderman, August Melcher Myrberg and Olle Strandberg, 1869–1880 Joseph Dente, 1880–91 Ludvig Ohlsson, and 1891–1915 Erik Åkerberg. The choir's conductors from the 1970s were Håkan Sund, Hans Lundgren and Hans Kyhle (1979–2007). Since 2010, the choir has been led by Ian Plaude.

== Sources ==
- "Käraste Bröder, vi ses på Kejsarkronan!" [Dearest Brothers, See You at Kejsarkronan!] (in Swedish). Par Bricole. August 2019.
- Sällskapet Par Bricole 200 år: en jubileumsskrift [Par Bricole Society 200 years: a Jubilee Record] (in Swedish). Stockholm: Par Bricole Society. 1978.
- Lönnroth, Lars (2005). Ljuva karneval! : om Carl Michael Bellmans diktning [Lovely Carnival! : about Carl Michael Bellman's Verse]. Stockholm: Albert Bonniers Förlag. ISBN 978-91-0-057245-7. OCLC 61881374.
- Mattsson, Gottfrid (1946). Sällskapet Par Bricole. Stockholm: AB Biografiskt Galleri.
- Kinberg, August (1903). Par Bricoles Gustavianska Period. Stockholm: Hasse W. Tullbergs Forlag.
- Åkerberg, Eric (1910). Musiklifvet inom Par Bricole, 1779-1890. Stockholm: Albert Bonniers.
