= Ljuva karneval! =

2005 book about Carl Michael Bellman by Lars Lönnroth

Ljuva karneval! Om Carl Michael Bellmans diktning
- Cover of 1st edition
- Author: Lars Lönnroth
- Illustrator: various artists
- Cover artist: Antoine Watteau
- Language: Swedish
- Subject: Carl Michael Bellman
- Genre: Literary criticism
- Published: 2005
- Publisher: Albert Bonniers Förlag
- Media type: hardback
- Pages: 405
- ISBN: 978-9100572457

Ljuva karneval! (Sweet Carnival!) is a 2005 book about the work of Sweden's national bard, the 18th-century poet and performer Carl Michael Bellman, by the Swedish literary scholar Lars Lönnroth. Bellman is the central figure in Swedish song, known in particular for his 1790 collection, Fredman's Epistles. Lönnroth, who has studied Bellman since the 1960s, aims to give an overview of Bellman's work, describing the essence of Bellman's art: giving a frolicking one-man performance, religious or profane, through adapted tunes, imitated crowd sounds and speech in different languages, and songs in varied genres. He distinguishes carefully between the art and the person of Bellman, who in his view was by no means as drunken and debauched as the cast of his Epistles.

The text is illustrated with a selection, admired by critics, of halftone images of drawings, engravings, paintings, and sculptures.

The book has been well received by critics, who write that Lönnroth brings Bellman to life as a performance artist. They have praised its coverage of the Epistles as well as of Bellman's lesser-known works, and suggested that it will become the standard reference on his poetry.

== Context ==
Carl Michael Bellman is the central figure in Swedish song, known principally for his 1790 Fredman's Epistles and his 1791 Fredman's Songs. Bellman played the cittern, accompanying himself as he performed his songs at the royal court.

Fredman's Epistles is a collection of 82 poems set to music; it depicts everything from Rococo-themed pastorale with a cast of gods and demigods from classical antiquity to laments for the effects of Brännvin-drinking, tavern-scenes, and apparent improvisations. The lyrics, based on the lives of Bellman's contemporaries in Gustavian-age Sweden, describe a gallery of fictional and semi-fictional characters and events in Stockholm. Jean Fredman, an alcoholic former watchmaker, is the central character and fictional narrator.

Fredman's Songs is a mixed collection of songs, some on the same themes as the Epistles – love, drinking, and death, some loyally royalist, some to his friends, some pastoral, and some humorously biblical.

Lars Lönnroth is a Swedish literary scholar who has studied Bellman for over 40 years, having gained his PhD at the Stockholm University in 1965. He has been a professor of literature at the University of California Berkeley, the University of Aalborg and the University of Gothenburg.

== Book ==
=== Overview ===
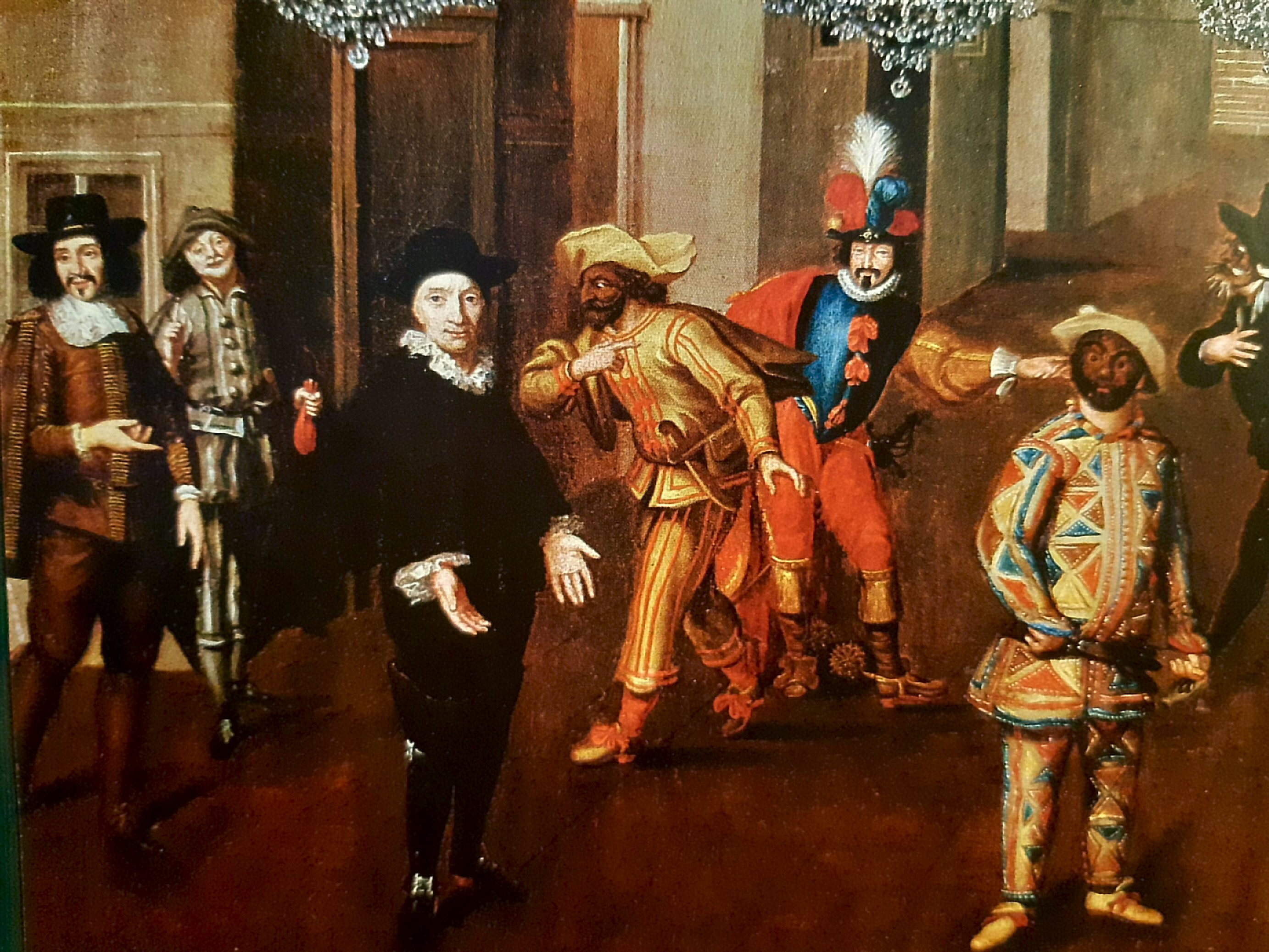
Lönnroth views Bellman as depicting life as a carnival, choosing this painting attributed to Antonio Verrio, Comédie-Française, 1670 for the inside front cover.

Lönnroth states that his book has two goals: to give an overview of Bellman's work in the light of modern scholarship, and to point up what he believes essential in Bellman's art: "a way of combining different genres, whether religious or profane, into a wholly new type of one-man performance, a frolicking masquerade with continuous switching between forms of expression."

In Lönnroth's view, the popular opinion that Bellman was always portraying himself in his work, so that he must have been a riotously drunken and debauched character like the cast of Fredmans Epistles, is mistaken. Instead, Bellman depicted his world as a sort of carnival. People play at worshipping Bacchus, the god of wine, and Venus, the goddess of love, splendidly attired in masquerade costume, but grief-stricken at life's sorrows under their painted masks. In Lönnroth's opinion, Bellman too concealed himself behind many masks, working as a troubadour to entertain people with songs and imitated voices in drinking-places, accompanying himself on his cittern, but also taking on other roles such as satirist, religious poet, and court playwright. Lönnroth describes how Bellman's varied performance skills enabled him to construct the highly original and complex Fredman's Epistles, ingeniously contrasting the classically sublime and romantic with the mundane and absurd world of 18th-century Stockholm.

=== Table of contents ===
1. The world as a masquerade
2. Pupil in the temple
3. Satirical moralist
4. Swedish Anacreon
5. In company with Old Man Noah
6. Musical comedy on shepherds and antiheroes
7. The Order of Bacchus
8. Fredman, the apostle of brandy
9. Fredman's transformations
10. Court poet
11. Bacchi Tempel
12. Blind alleys
13. Fredman's Epistles completed
14. End of the masquerade
15. Epilogue

=== Illustrations ===
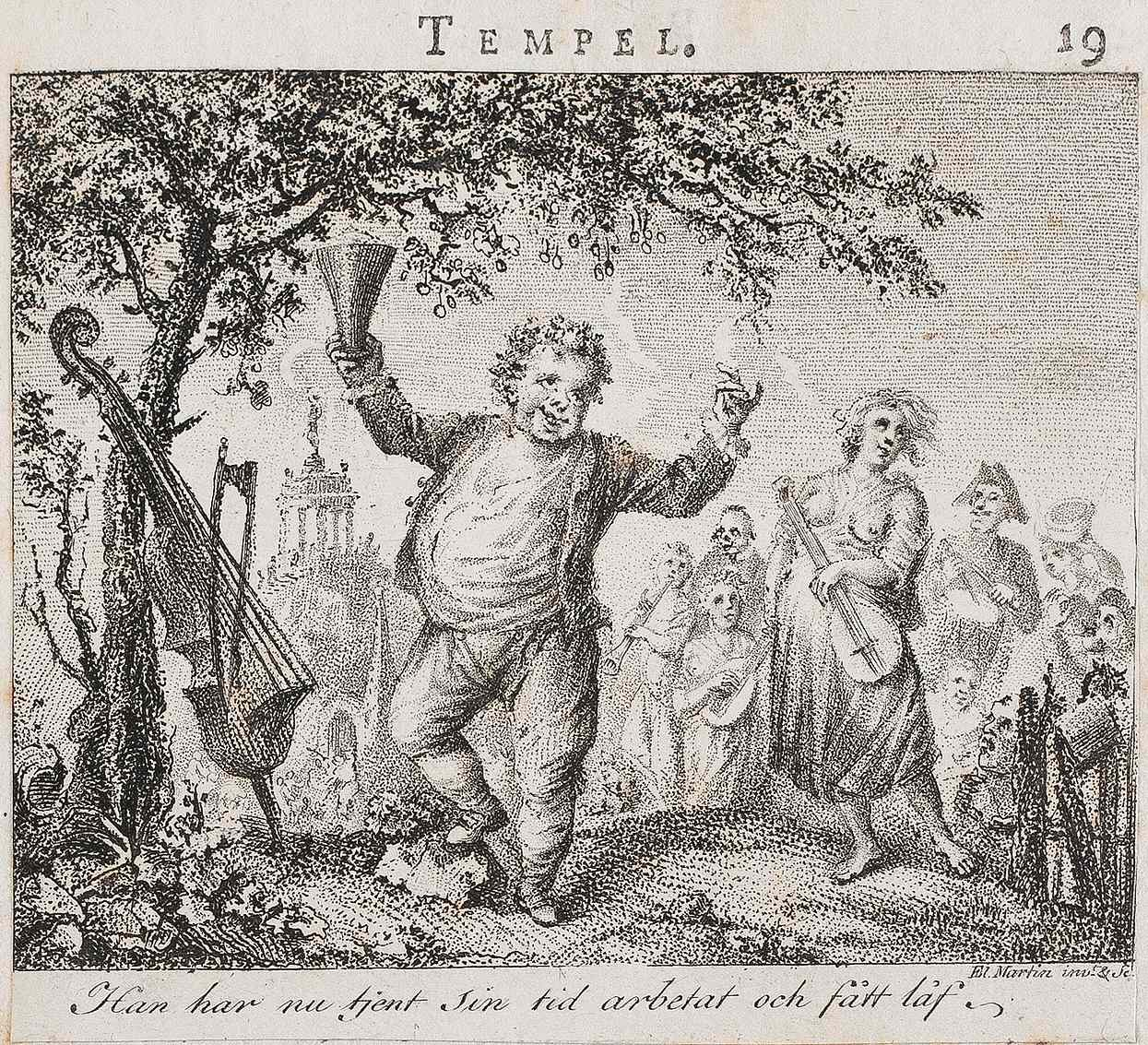
Illustration by Elias Martin of drunken celebrations by the "Order of Bacchus" from Bellman's Bacchi Tempel, 1783, engraved by his brother Johan Fredrik Martin.

The book is illustrated with halftone plates in the text, mostly of contemporary paintings of Bellman and his world by artists such as Elias Martin and Johan Tobias Sergel. The Epilogue is illustrated with a double-page spread of halftone photographs of musicians such as Fred Åkerström, Sven-Bertil Taube, Cornelis Vreeswijk and Martin Bagge interpreting Bellman's work. Inger Dahlman, reviewing the book, describes the collection of images illustrating the book as "fabulous".

The dust jacket shows Antoine Watteau's 1717 painting The Embarkation for Cythera. Additional colour plates are inside the front and rear covers, showing the Comedie Francaise by an anonymous artist in 1670, and Elias Martin's 1792 illustration of Bellman welcoming Erik and Gustava Palmstedt on Gustava's birthday.

=== Publication history ===
The book was published in 2005 as a 405-page hardback by Albert Bonniers Förlag.

== Reception ==
Reviewing Ljuva karneval! for Gotlands Allehanda, Inger Dahlman wrote that Lönnroth was dispelling the dominant 200 year old myth created by Johan Henric Kellgren that Bellman was always speaking for himself in Fredman's Epistles, whereas the reverse was the case, he uninterruptedly played carefully-crafted roles. Dahlman comments that Lönnroth appears to be irritated by people who imagine they can write biographies of Bellman from the bard's own writings, and that he is certainly right about that; but that all the same, one can still glimpse a "careless, friendly, proud, ingenious and tormented man" behind the many masks.

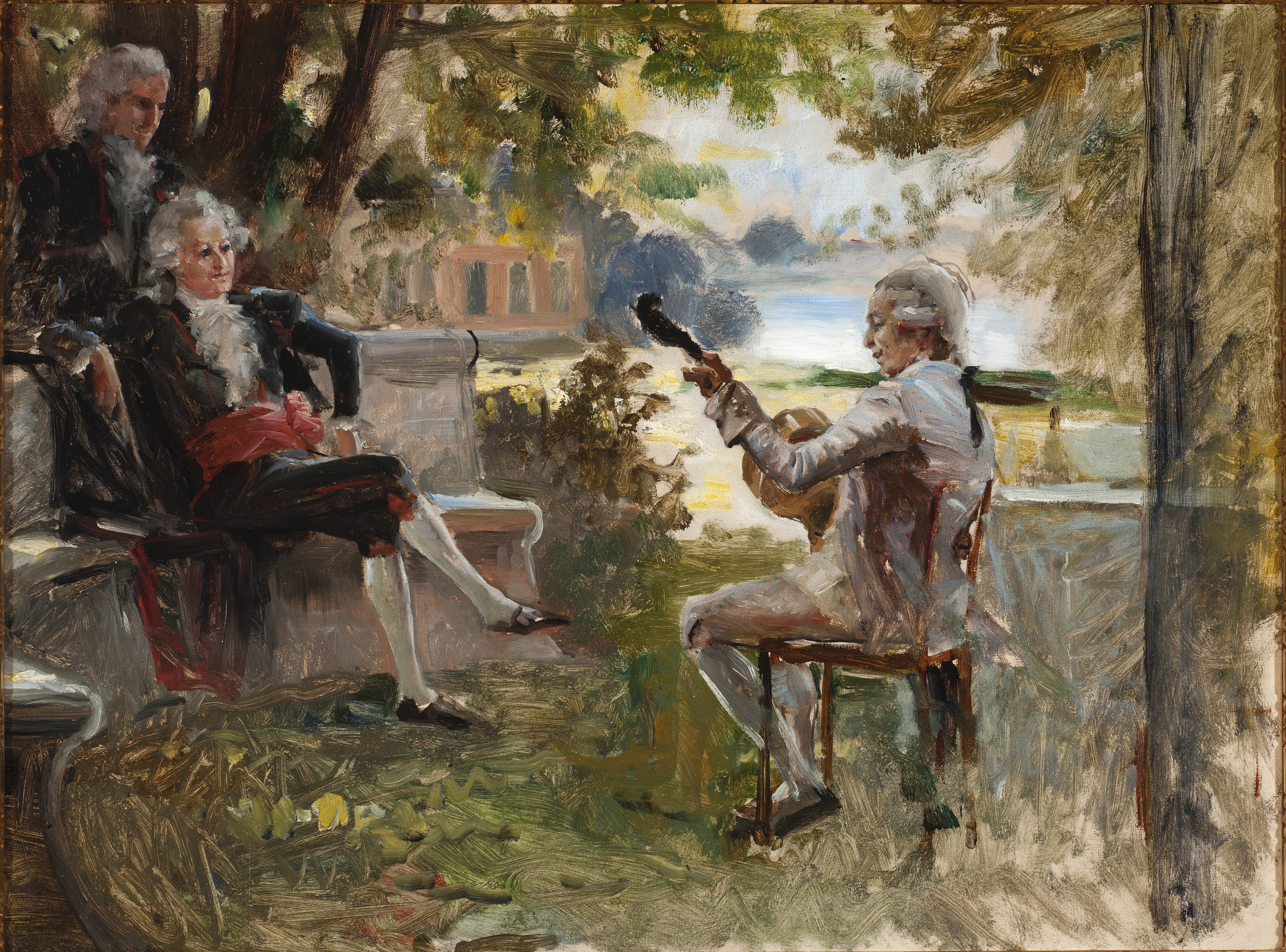
Lönnroth shows that Carl Michael Bellman was above all an entertainer, playing many roles. Painting of Bellman entertaining King Gustav III, by Albert Edelfelt, 1884.

Anders Cullhed, writing in Dagens Nyheter, notes that Bellman was not just a poet but a skilled mimic and bard, and that in the book, Lönnroth brings to life Bellman as a performance artist. Cullhed calls it remarkable that a "small land on Europe's cultural periphery" should have so many fine poets, of whom Bellman was the greatest; only Gunnar Ekelöf outgrew his boundaries in a comparable way, and scholars had struggled to capture Bellman's chameleon-like nature. Cullhed comments that Lönnroth touches so briefly on so many texts that depth can be lacking; and his attempt not to make the book a biography hadn't worked as the path of Bellman's life is visible from start to end. But overall, in his view, Lönnroth brings to light Bellman's experimental, genre-crossing creativity, in a book that is "a pleasure to read" and clearly the product of decades of research.

Torkel Stålmarck writes in Samlaren that Lönnroth had contributed to Bellman research since the 1960s. In his view, the "carnival" of the title sums up the book's view of Bellman's life and times, a constant masquerade, central to his art, a one-man exhibition "where the bard performs a kind of musical comedy for the audience with scenes depicting both 'high' and 'low' characters". Stålmarck states that Fredmans Epistles rightly take a central place in the book, but that Bellman's lesser-known works, like Bacchi Tempel, are also covered, offering the reader something new and surprising.

Per Olsen, reviewing the book for the Danish Bellman Society, calls it an ambitious, synoptic, and successful decoding of the whole of Bellman's varied output, its genres, themes, language and style. Olsen notes that the title alludes to an early poem by Bellman from 1763, containing the lines "Du liufva carnaval,/Du lindrar sorg og kval" (You sweet carnival, you heal sorrow and pain), and "Vår värld är en maskrad,/Där mången synes glad,/Men gråter under masken…" (Our world is a masked ball, where many look happy, but are crying under their masks).

Johan Stenström, reviewing the book for Svenska Dagbladet, wrote that Lönnroth's book on the national bard would become the standard reference for understanding Bellman's poetry.

== Bibliography ==
- Lönnroth, Lars (2005). Ljuva karneval! : om Carl Michael Bellmans diktning (in Swedish). Stockholm: Albert Bonniers Förlag. ISBN 978-91-0-057245-7. OCLC 61881374.
