= Anna Oscàr =

Swedish actress

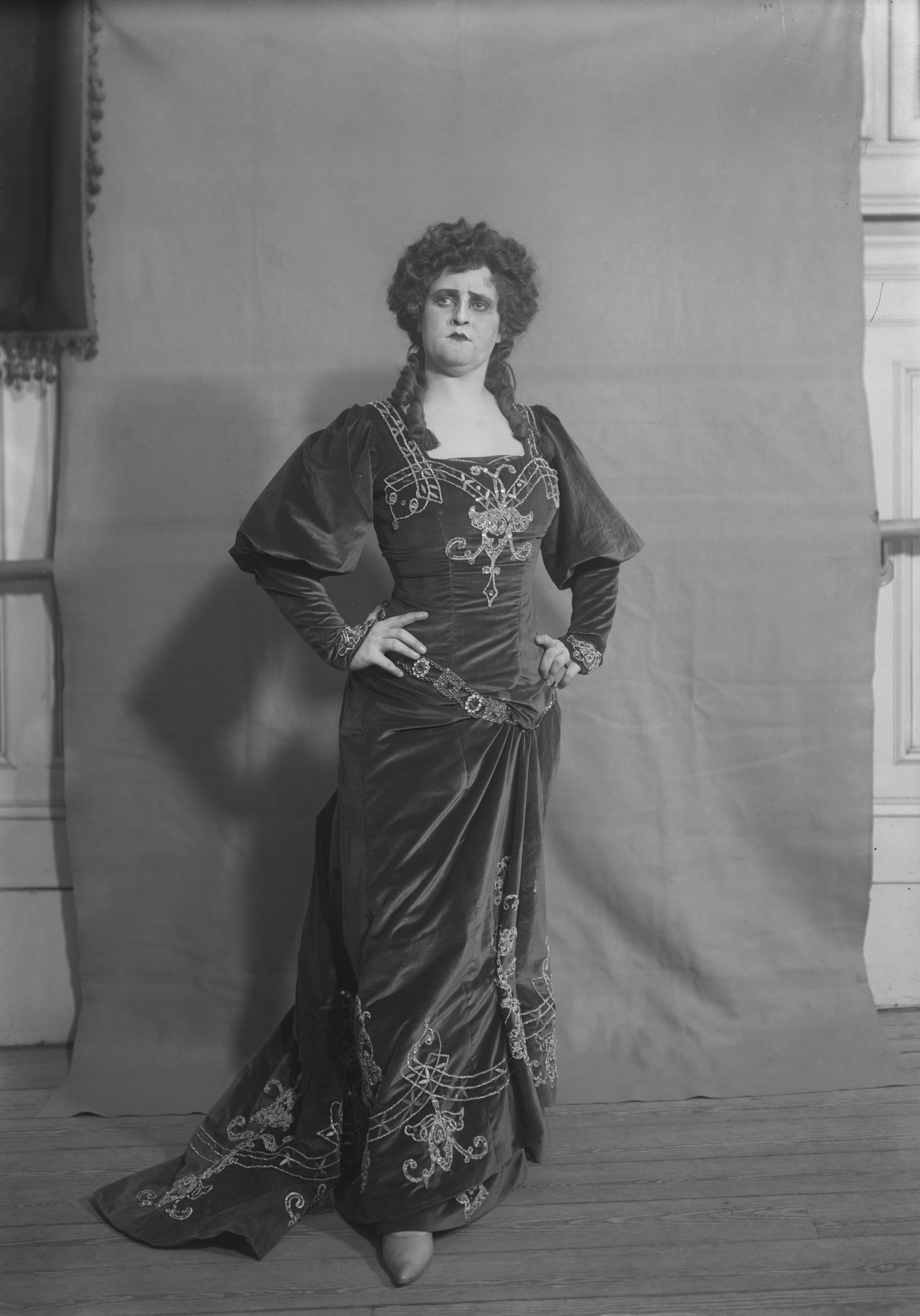
Anna Oscàr in Don Giovanni at the Royal Swedish Opera in 1914

Anna Dorothea Oscàr (1875–1915) was a Swedish opera singer. Considered to be Sweden's leading soprano of the period, she made her debut using her maiden name, Anna Thulin, at the Royal Swedish Opera as Papagena in Mozart's The Magic Flute when she was 16. Engaged by the company in 1896, she remained there for the rest of her life singing some 60 different roles in the major German, Italian, French and Swedish operas. Apart from three successful summer tours to the United States in the 1900s, she was otherwise based in Sweden. Married twice, she performed under the name Anna Hellström during her first marriage from 1900 through 1905, and after her second marriage in 1907 to the baritone Martin Oscàr, as Anna Oscàr. In 1908 she was elected a member of the Royal Swedish Academy of Music.

== Biography ==
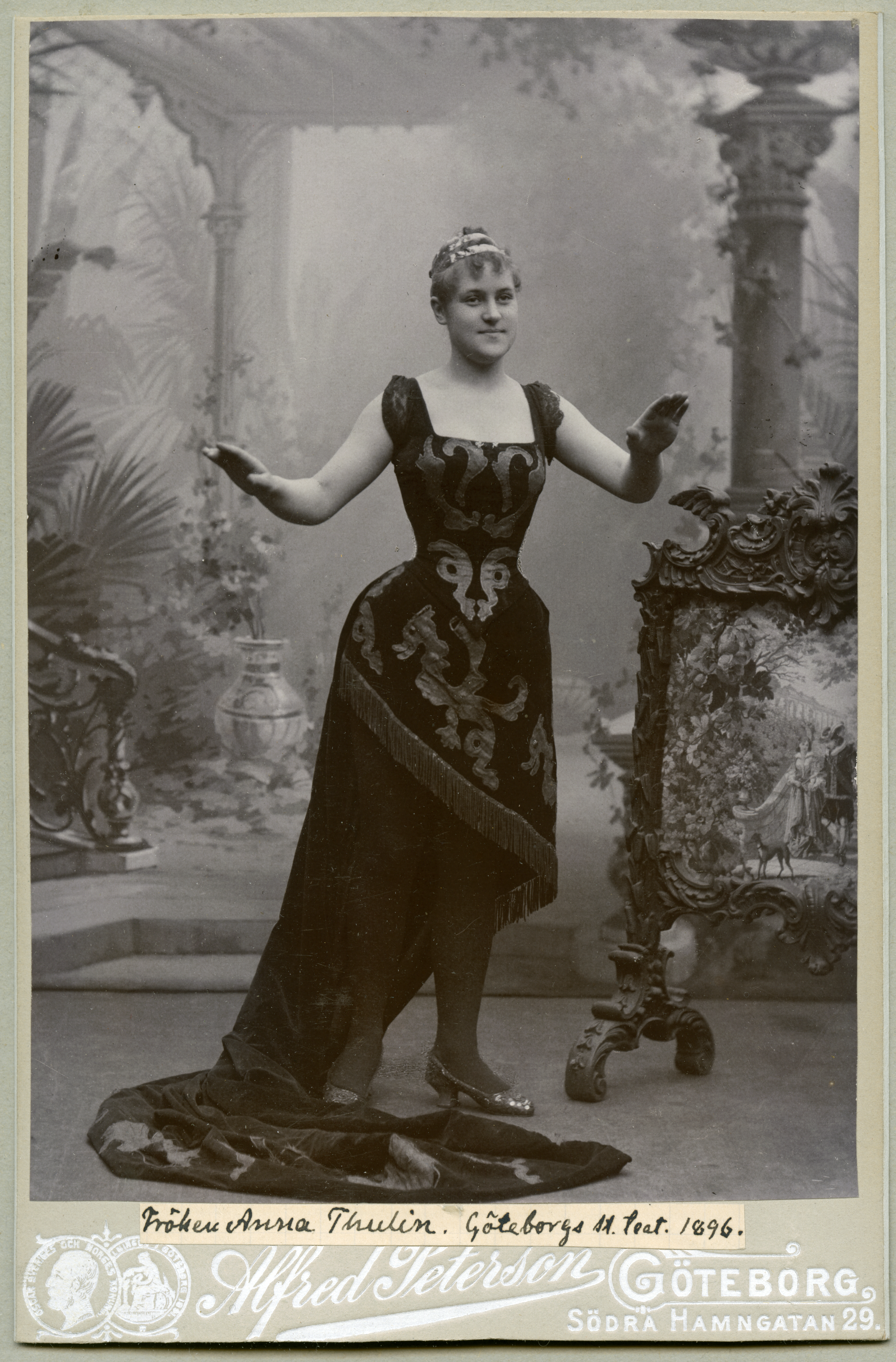
Oscàr, then known by her maiden name Thulin, performing in 1896

Born in Stockholm on 29 April 1875, Anna Dorothea Thulin was the daughter of the tailor Sven Tufvesson Thulin and his wife Catharina Carolina Andersdotter Sahlin. After attending the Royal Theatre's ballet school, she turned to singing, receiving instruction from the baritone Isidor Dannström and the soprano Signe Hebbe.

She made her debut when she was 16 as Papagena in The Magic Flute which was performed in the Royal Opera's former theatre building. She went on to play Gerda in Ivar Hallström's Den bergtagna (The bride of the mountain king) and Anna in Andreas Randel's Värmlänninger. From 1896, she performed regularly at the Royal Opera. She performed as Anna Thulin until her first marriage to Carl Olof Teodor Hellström, a bank clerk, in 1900 when she began performing as Anna Hellström. After divorcing Hellström in 1905, she married the baritone Martin Oscàr in 1907; after which point she performed under the name Anna Oscàr.

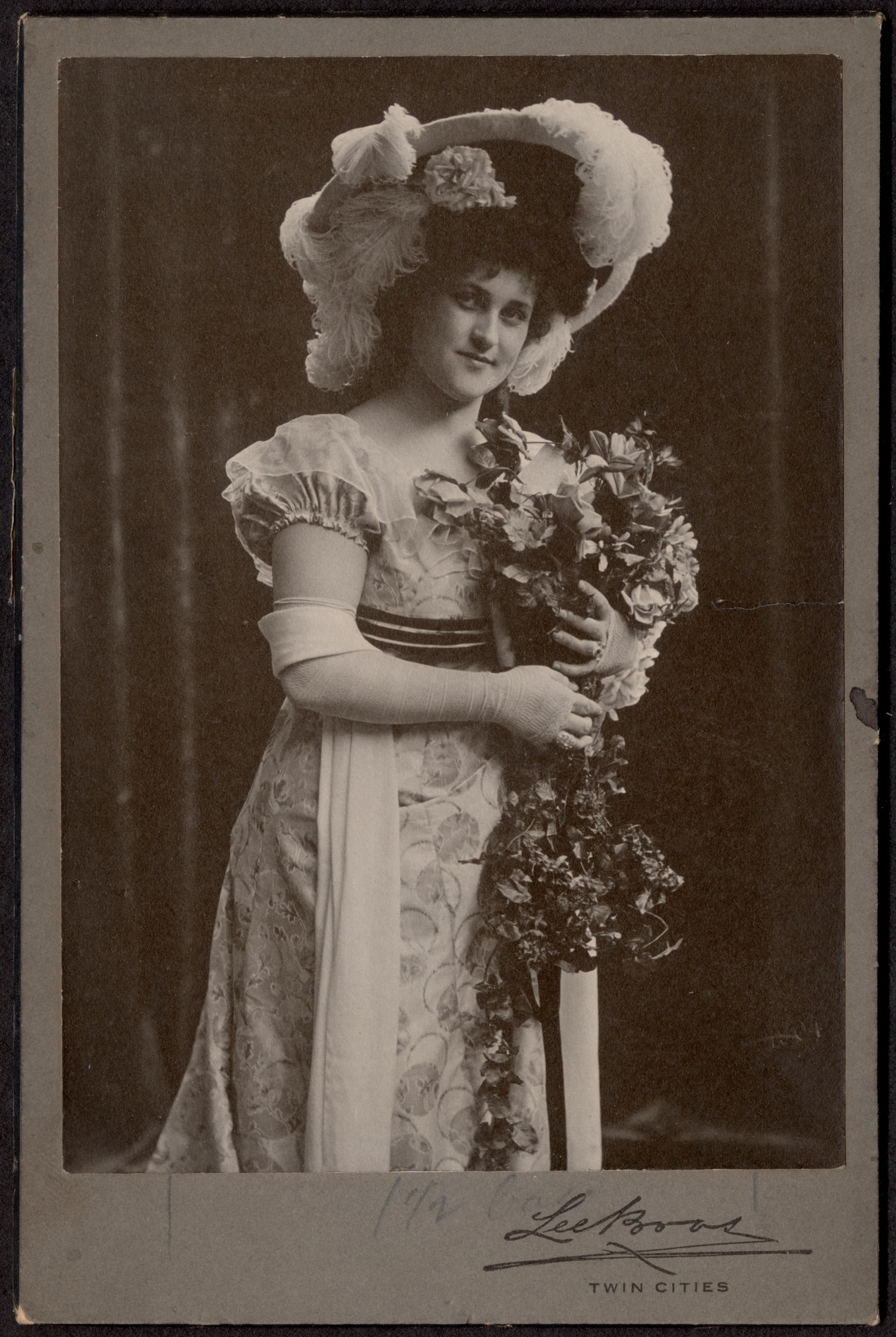
Mde. Anna Hellstrom, ca. 1890-1915; from the Philip Hale Collection of the Boston Public Library

She remained with the Royal Opera for the rest of her life, becoming one of the most successful singers of the period with enthusiastic support from the critics. She took the lead soprano roles in both Swedish works and the popular romantic operas, playing Susanna in The Marriage of Figaro, Violetta in La traviata and the title role in Carmen. In addition, she performed as a concert and oratorio singer throughout the country.

Anna Oscàr died in Stockholm on 10 September 1915.

== Awards ==
Oscàr was awarded the Litteris et Artibus medal in 1915. In 1908, she was elected a member of the Royal Swedish Academy of Music.
