= Andreas Randel =

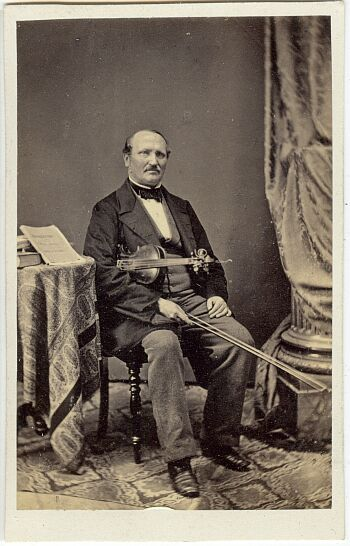
Andreas Randel

Andreas Randel (6 October 1806 – 27 October 1864) was a Swedish composer and violinist. The overture to his The People from Vårmland was recorded by Kungliga Hovkapellet Stig Westerburg.

== Biography ==
Randel got his last name from Ramdala parish; he was originally called Pettersson. He worked as a concertmaster at the Royal Swedish Opera, regiment musician and was a professor at the Royal Swedish Academy of Music when he died. Randel learned to play pole shoes and hymns on a violin he got from a wandering player. In 1818 he came to Karlskrona where he was noted for his talent, among others by free lord Gerhard De Geer, who raised him together with his own sons. In 1821, with the support of Crown Prince Oscar, he traveled to Paris to study violin playing for Pierre Baillot and composition for Luigi Cherubini.

He returned to Stockholm with a high rating in 1828, and immediately got a position as violinist. In 1838 he became second concertmaster in the court chapel and in 1861 first chaplain. Since 1844 he had been a violin teacher and from 1859 a professor at the Royal Swedish Academy of Music, where he had become a member in 1837. For several years he worked as music director of the 2nd Life Grenadier Regiment and between 1853 and 1862 he was leader of the Par Bricole singing choir. In 1858 he made a concert tour to Germany and France.

Randel composed and arranged music for 20 dramatic pieces, including Macbeth, Deborah, Torkel Knutsson, Ung-Hanses daughter and Fredrik August Dahlgren's Värmlänninger, to which he contributed by arranging the music and composing several of the songs in folkton as well as the overture. He also wrote several orchestral works, including a mourning march at Oscar I's funeral and a jubilee overture at Charles XV's wedding. In addition, he wrote three violin concerti, two fantasies of Swedish folk songs, three string quartets and several solo pieces for violin as well as toned Fast are the moments of life, Ren himself the evening seems to raise and several man quartets as well as a lot of solo songs.

Andreas Randel is buried at Norra begravningsplatsen in Stockholm.

In 1994, the Randel Society was founded in Ramdala with the aim of keeping his name alive in his birthplace.

== Works ==
- Violin Concerto No. 1 in D minor
