= Anders Abraham Grafström =

Swedish historian, priest and poet (1790–1870)

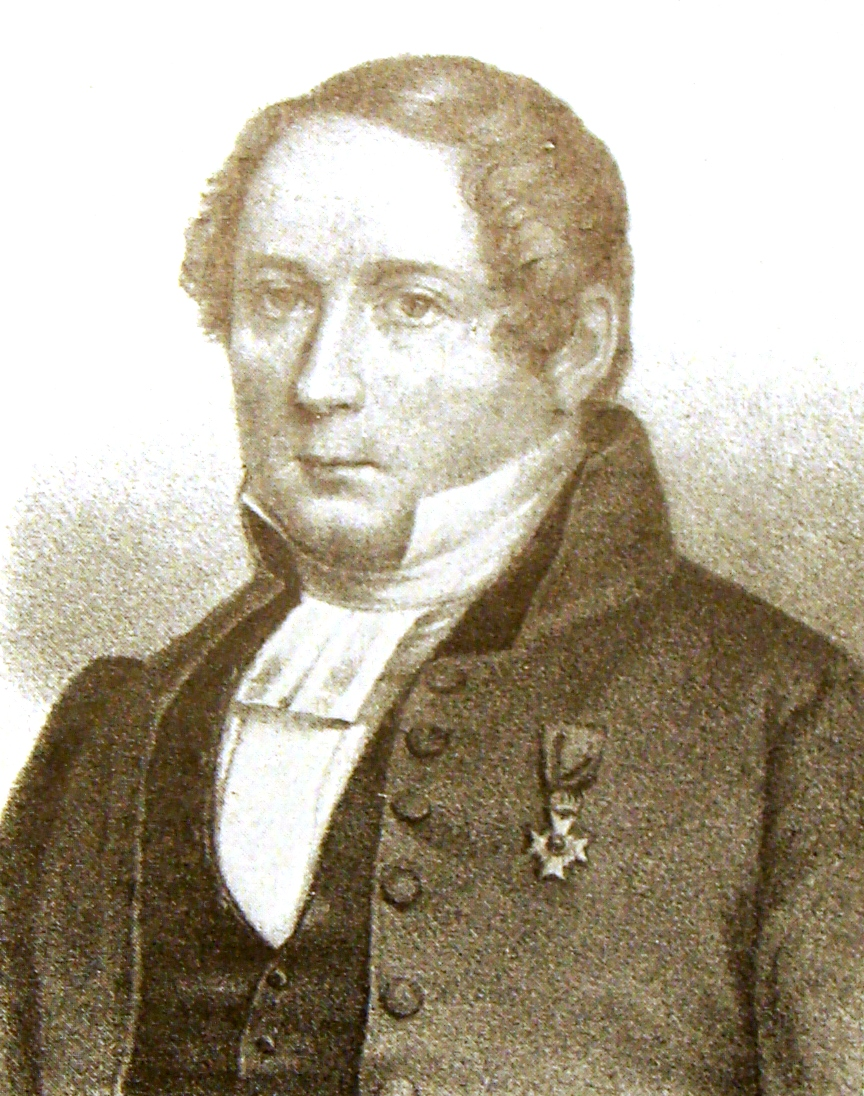
- Born: 10 January 1790; Sundsvall, Sweden
- Died: 24 July 1870 (aged 80); Umeå, Sweden
- Occupations: Professor; parish priest
- Writing career
- Language: Swedish
- Genres: Poetry; history

Anders Abraham Grafström (10 January 1790 – 24 July 1870) was a Swedish historian, priest and poet.

== Life ==
Grafström was born in Sundsvall in Västernorrland County, Sweden. He studied at Uppsala University, where he was enrolled in 1809 and became a master's degree in 1815. In 1819, he was the library secretary of Uppsala University. The following year he was named as a lecturer in history at the university, and he later taught at the Military Academy Karlberg. In 1830 he was ordained and in 1835 he was appointed as a parish priest at Umeå in Västerbotten where he lived until his death. In 1825, he received the grand prize from Swedish Academy for a poem about the wedding of Crown Prince Oscar and was admitted into the academy in 1839, occupying Seat 6.

Grafström belonged to the literary circle centred on salon hostess. Malla Silfverstolpe (1782–1861). He wrote a famous biography of poet Frans Michael Franzén. Some of Grafström's poetry was set to music by the composer Johan Erik Nordblom (1788–1848).

== Personal life ==
He was married in 1822 to Henriette Elisabeth Franzén (1803–1833) and after her death to her half-sister Helena Sophia Franzén (1813–1891). His father-in-Law was Bishop Frans Michael Franzén (1772–1847).

His daughter Sofia Elisabeth Grafström (1839–1874) married teacher and folklorist Artur Hazelius (1833–1901) .

In his later years, Grafström was a vocal exponent of the expansion of the railway network into Norrland. He died at Umeå, aged 80.

== Bibliography ==
- De lingua, originis gentis Sviogothicae indice. Upsala, 1811.
- Tal öfver Högstsalig Hans Majestät Konung Carl XIII, hållet på Gustavianska Lärosalen i Upsala, den 6 maj 1818. Stockholm, 1818.
- De Statu Rerum Sveciarum ad Mortem Ingialdi Illråda Dissertatio Historica. (Beteiligt Petrus Ephraim Oldberg und Johannes P. Bosén). Dissertation Upsala 1820.
- De reformatione religionis christianae post Lutherum continuata. Upsala, 1829.
- Skalde-försök. Stockholm, 1826–1832.
- Ett år i Sverige. Stockholm, 1827-35 (Ed. Christian Didrik Forssell).
- Sånger från Norrland. Stockholm, 1841.
- Nya sånger från Norrland. Stockholm, 1848.
- Samlade skaldestycken. Stockholm, 1864.

Cultural offices
Preceded by Adolf Göran Mörner	Swedish Academy, Seat No 6; 1839-1870	Succeeded by Fredrik August Dahlgren
