= Tingvallagymnasiet =

Secondary school in Karlstad, Sweden

Coordinates: 59°22′50.7″N 13°30′17.7″E

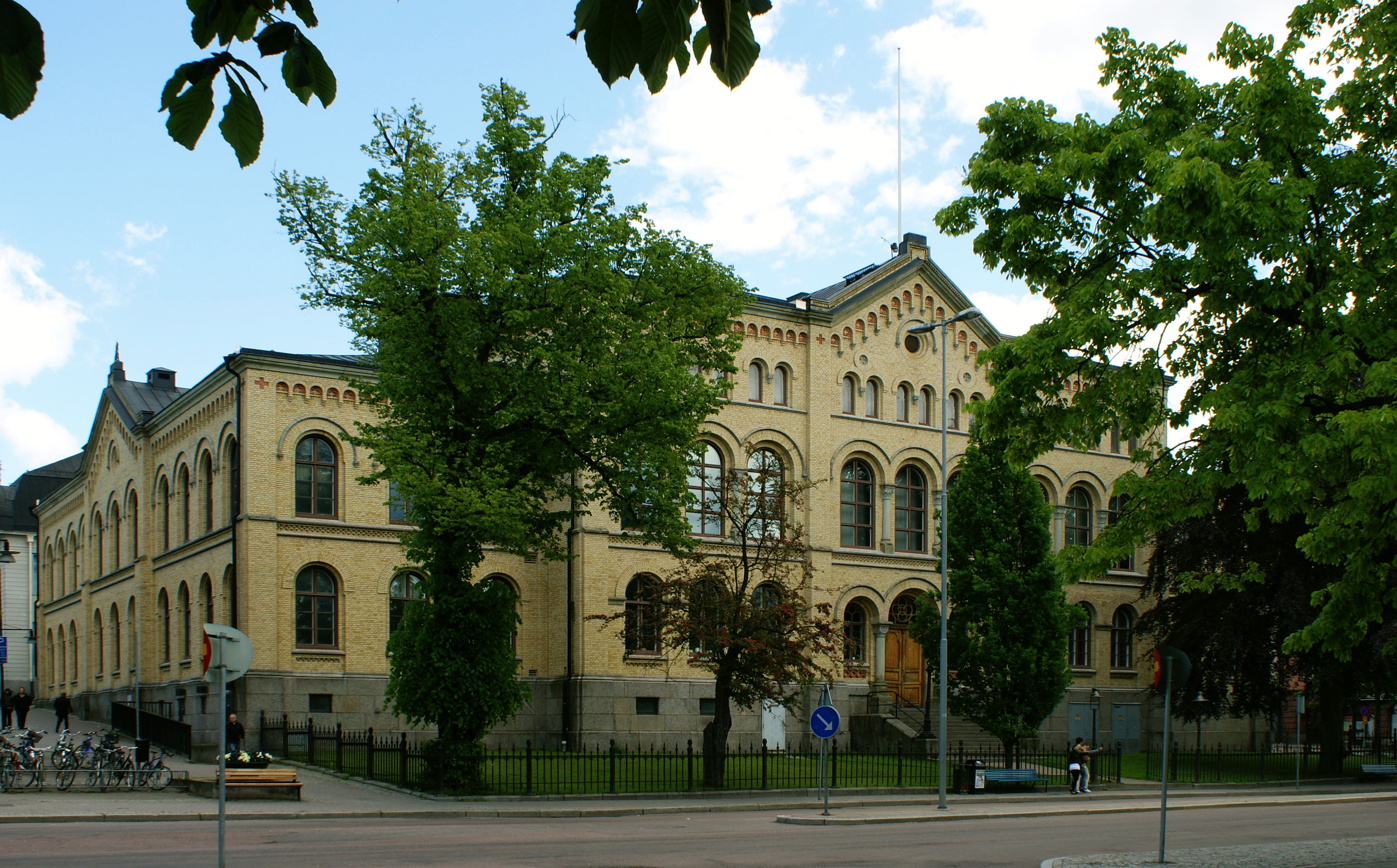
Tingvallagymnasiet, Gamla läroverket

Tingvallagymnasiet (Tingvalla upper secondary school) is an upper secondary school in Karlstad, Sweden, offering education programmes both in the social and natural sciences.

== History ==
Construction of the school started after Karlstad was granted its Royal charter in 1584, and it was most likely to have been completed in 1586, then as a two-story wooden building. As all other Swedish educational facilities it was then dedicated to the teachings of the church. Following the great fire of 1752, the school was relocated to its current position at the East side of the town's main square.

Following the construction of the main building in stone, several new additions have been made, integrating the school premises with several blocks in central Karlstad.

== Notable alumni ==
- Fredrik August Dahlgren
- Tage Erlander
- Anders Fryxell
- Gustaf Fröding
