= Jänta å ja =

Swedish folk song

Jänta å ja' is a folksong from Värmland, published by Fredrik August Dahlgren. It is a common Round dance around the Christmas tree and the Midsummerpole in Sweden.

The song was recorded in 1904, and has also been recorded with lyrics in English, using titles like "My Girl and I", "Me and My Gal", and "Midsummer Eve".
