= Bacchi Tempel =

Book-length poem in alexandrines by Carl Michael Bellman

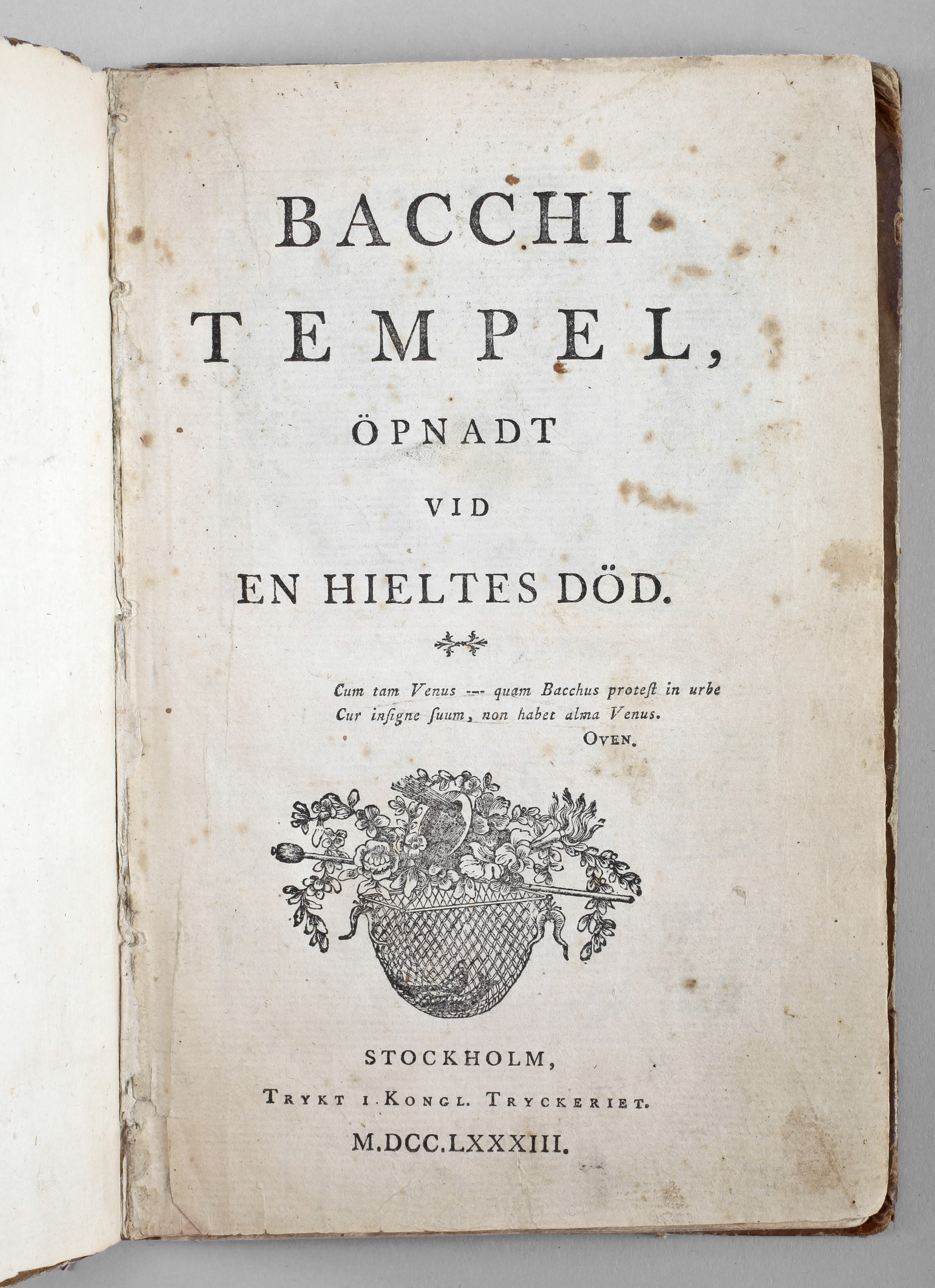
- Title page of first edition
- Author: Carl Michael Bellman
- Illustrator: Elias Martin
- Language: Swedish
- Genre: Song collection
- Publisher: Kongliga Tryckeriet
- Publication date: 1783
- Publication place: Sweden

Bacchi tempel öppnat vid en hjältes död ('The Temple of Bacchus Opened at a Hero's Death'), commonly known as Bacchi Tempel, is a song play, a long poem in two thousand alexandrines, written by Carl Michael Bellman. It was published by Sweden's royal printing press in 1783. The illustrator was Elias Martin. The work had been preceded by a version from 1779 titled "Bacchi Temple opened at the death of Corporal and Order Oboist Father Movitz", but had been reworked and expanded several times.

The work has probably never been performed in its entirety, but individual songs are sometimes performed by the Par Bricole society. It has been described as a curious hybrid, a combination of comic opera and mock-heroic verse, and as a not very satisfactory work, despite the "lovely" song Böljan sig mindre rör ('Still'd is the hasty wave').

== Context ==
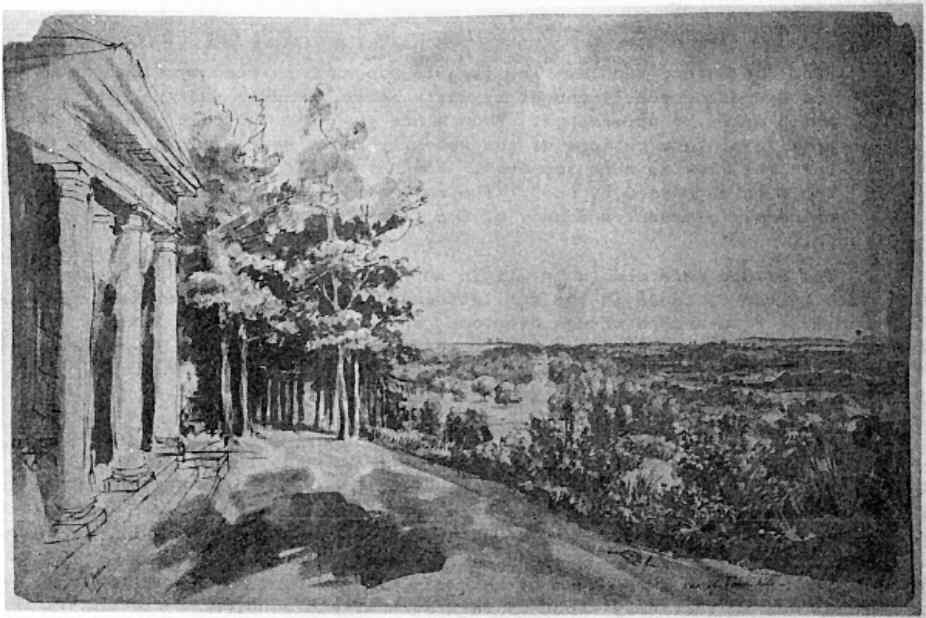
Temple of Bacchus, a folly in Painshill Park by Elias Martin 1770. Martin went on to illustrate Bacchi Tempel for Carl Michael Bellman.

The songs originate in Carl Michael Bellman's performances on the theme The Order of Bacchus (Bacchi Orden), Bacchus being the Roman god of wine, starting in 1769–1771, after which the production was largely unseen until 1777. That the production of song games, of which Bacchi Tempel was the most important, was resumed can probably be linked to the Par Bricole society at the end of the 1770s. In contrast to the previous parodies, the new social life was strictly ritualized with many participants, the style more solemn and the music more ambitious. In addition, several of the figures from Bellman's songbook Fredman's Epistles have now been identified in the cast: both Movitz and Mollberg have minor roles, while Ulla Winblad has taken on a central role as leader of the "Bacchi priestesses".

Bellman began work on what would become Bacchi Tempel soon after the news of the death of the model of his corporal Movitz in May 1779; an initial print was dedicated to the court engraver Pierre Suther at the end of the year with the hope of engaging him for an illustrated edition of the work. This failed, but later he succeeded in getting Elias and Johan Fredrik Martin to illustrate the work. In 1780, extended versions in handwriting were handed over to Elis Schröderheim and Samuel af Ugglas, suggesting that the author had great ambitions with the work, possibly with the aim of improving his reputation after he was attacked by the famous critic Johan Henric Kellgren in 1778 through the derisive Mina löjen ('My Laughter'). Bellman continued to work on it, adding, among other things, long descriptions of nature in alexandrines in the style of James Thomson.

The work was advertised for sale via subscription in Stockholms Posten in September 1782, as a "poetic, comic and musical work". The announcement was aimed at "lovers of madness", which again points to ambitions. However, the work was not printed until the end of 1783, and new advertisements pointed to its suitability as a Christmas present. It was warmly reviewed in Svenska Parnassen.

== Publication ==
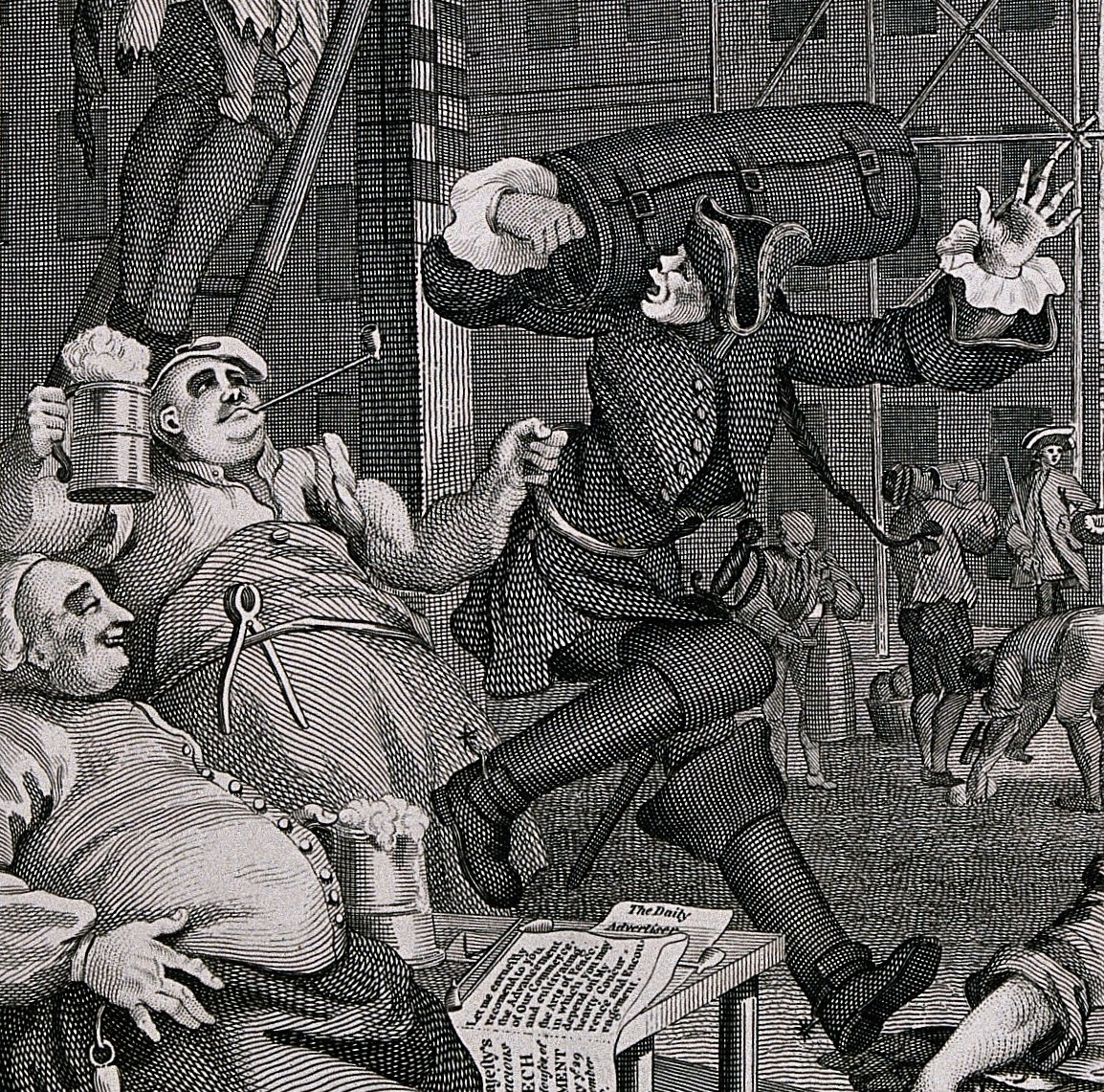
The book's illustrator, Elias Martin, studied William Hogarth's illustrations, such as his 1751 Beer Street (detail shown).

Bacchi Tempel was published in 1783 by Kongliga Tryckeriet, the Swedish royal printing press in Stockholm. It was Bellman's first book. The illustrations were by the landscape painter Elias Martin; they were engraved by his brother Johan Fredrik Martin. The brothers were friends of Bellman's; Elias had studied painting, especially Hogarth's, in London, had visited and painted an ornamental Temple of Bacchus in Painshill Park at Cobham, Surrey, and had come back to Stockholm in 1780. The book had been planned as the first volume of a two-volume set; the second was to have been Fröjas Tempel ('Freya's Temple'), but it never appeared.

== Summary ==
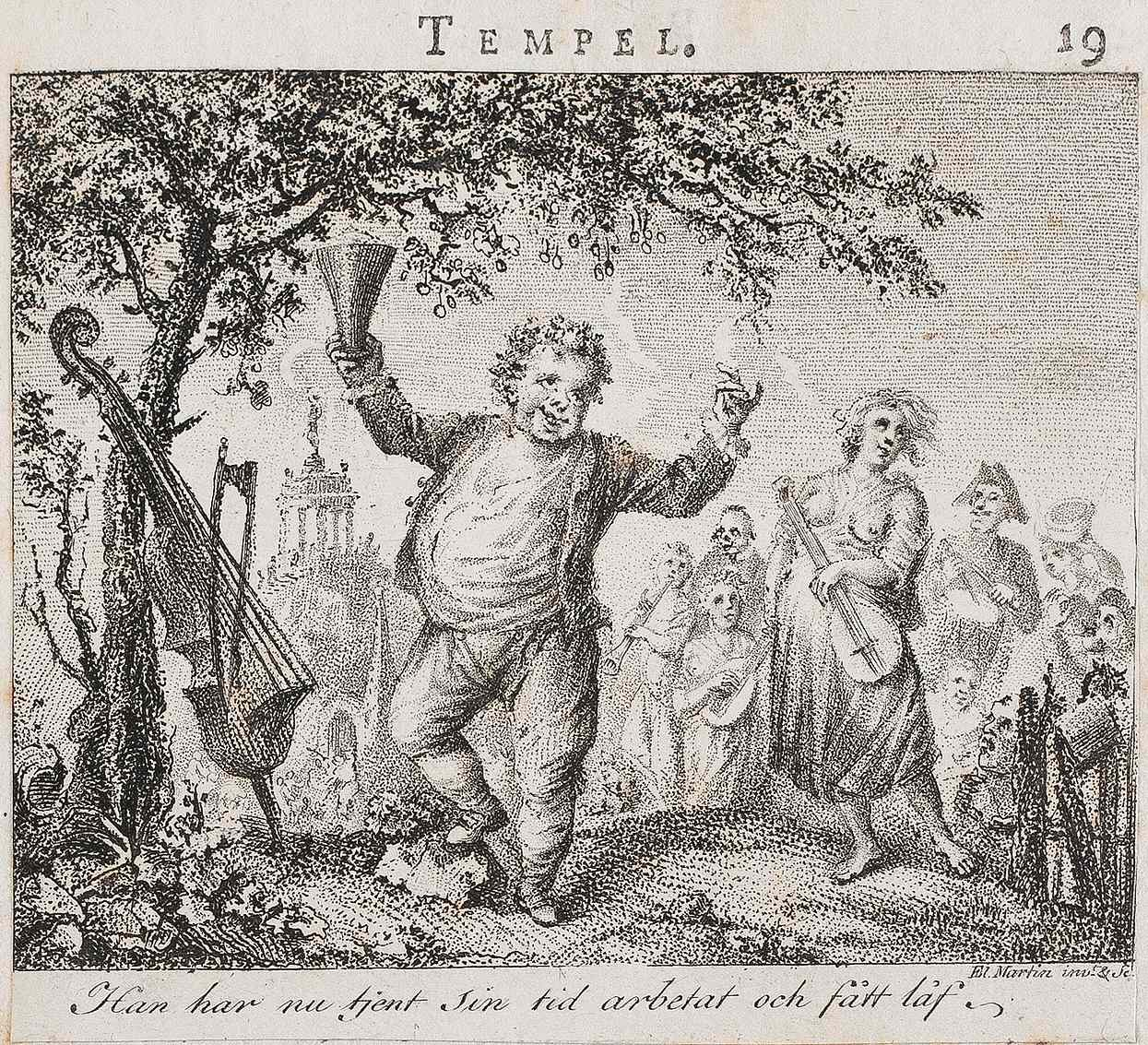
Illustration by Elias Martin of drunken celebrations by the "Order of Bacchus" from Bacchi Tempel, 1783, engraved by his brother Johan Fredrik Martin.

The play takes place around a temple dedicated to Bacchus, the god of wine, on an island of mixed flora and fauna: there are pine trees and crows as well as parrots and almond trees. Somewhere nearby, the goddess of pleasure Fröja also has a temple. Around the temple, a celebration is being commemorated by the dead Movitz, initially by a group of supporters under the leadership of the highly pregnant Ulla Winblad. The work begins with a stormy night, but at dawn the storm passes and everything turns into rural idyll, and the readers are informed that it is Movitz who is the father of Ulla's children, and she describes how it came to be in this particular place. Then the male participants, the "brothers of the order" arrive in boats, led by the order's "grenadier" Mollberg and its sexton Trundman, and march up to the temple. When they arrive, together with barrels of drink, songs and celebrations are held in honour first of the dead, then of Trundman and the brothers, Ulla and the priests, the order's chancellor Planberg, and finally the head of the order, Janke Jensen. The rituals are interrupted from time to time by various intermezzos, but eventually fade out completely as Ulla gives birth to a new Movitz, and everything turns into a happy party.

The extended version seems to have become difficult to play; where the original version could be performed in one hour, the final one required at least two. The entire extension is due to longer monologues and additional pieces of music, making it rather static as a piece of theatre.

The added landscape depictions are partly based on the nature being painted as a picture, which, however, must at the same time be animated and linked together with the speaker's emotions. Thus, when the initial storm is portrayed by the Bacchus priestess, it is not only a storm, but also her own anxiety and terror as described, in pre-romantic style. When the storm has subsided, the priestesses' attitude to the surroundings also changes, and the now pastoral landscape instead evokes happy memories of past happiness, when Movitz with roses in his hair used to honour the wine god with song. Ulla then takes the word, and more and more excitedly she describes his memories of him, before she sees through a telescope both the love goddess in the sky and a young "nymph" named Belinda.

When the men arrive, the women quickly become more crass: they describe the "Knights of Bacchus" in ironic terms as "heroes" who, however, urinate on planks and resemble roast pigs. Sexton Trundman takes over and describes the night's storm, with words taken from Jacob Wallenberg's Min son på galejan ("My son at the galley"), possibly to add an air of authenticity.

In the closing passage, spoken by Janke Jensen, it is no longer a question of depicting nature: now a mythological tableau is painted, with Movitz on Mount Olympus together with ancient gods and heroes such as Mars, Pompey, and Hannibal. Suddenly he turns back to mortality, and goes on to portray Movitz's earthly existence as a drunkard, until he is interrupted by Ulla giving birth to his and Movitz's children, who resemble him right down to his red nose.

== Reception ==
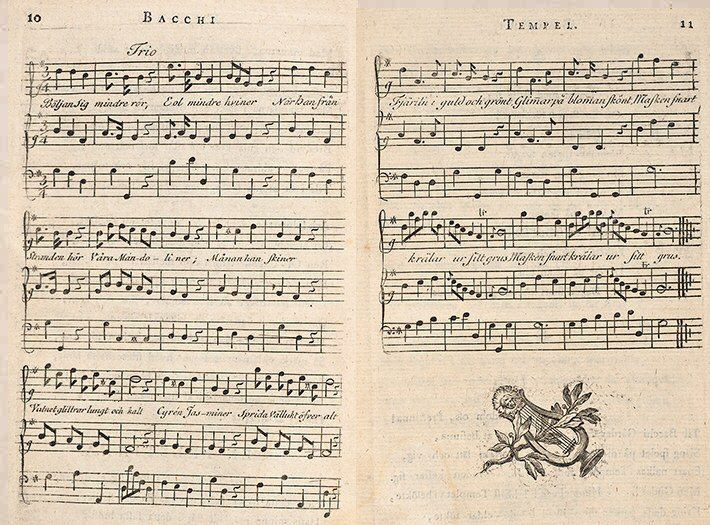
Böljan sig mindre rör ('Still'd is the hasty wave'), one of the songs in the book

The Swedish scholar Lars Lönnroth called the book "a curious hybrid of comic opera and mock-heroic poetry", and one of Bellman's "most ambitious" projects, intended, in response to Kellgren's attack, to prove that he was a serious poet. Lönnroth notes that Lennart Breitholtz "finally" gave the book a thorough scholarly examination; Breitholtz numbered it among the "most interesting literary experiments in 18th century literature".

The English biographer of Bellman, Paul Britten Austin, wrote that Bacchi Tempel was "exhausting" to read, and that while it contained "a few very beautiful lyrics", such as "the lovely Böljan sig mindre rör ('Still'd is the hasty wave') with its butterfly-wing delicacy", the song play was "not a very satisfactory work". The song "Still'd is the hasty wave" was recorded in English by Martin Best in 1975.

Böljan sig mindre rör (first stanza)
Carl Michael Bellman, 1783

Böljan sig mindre rör
Eol mindre viner,
när han från stranden hör
våra mandoliner;
månan han skiner,
vattnet glittrar lugnt och kallt,
syren, jasminer
sprida vällukt över allt,
fjäriln i guld och grönt,
glimmar på blomman skönt,
||: masken snart krälar ur sitt grus. :||

Prose translation

The wave calms down
Aeolus howls less,
when from the beach he hears
our mandolins;
the moon shines,
the water glistens calm and cold,
lilac, jasmines
spread their scent all around,
the butterfly in gold and green,
glimmers lovely on the flower,
||: but the worm will soon crawl from its grit. :||

== Songs included ==
- Flodens sorl och vädrens fläkt
- Böljan sig mindre rör
- Bakom dessa gröna lindar
- Uppå vattnets lugna våg
- Sälla strand, där vi nu landa
- Marsch, över allt, följ Martis spår
- Manskap, giv akt
- Hurra, se min fåla
- Skåden hit, märk och minns
- Om ödet skull' mig skicka
- Sjung mina söner alla tolv
- Sjungom systrar, Fröjas ära
- Tom är min flaska, tunnan utrunnen
- Hvem är, som ej vår broder mins?
- Bort allt vad oro gör

== Sources ==
- Britten Austin, Paul (1967). The Life and Songs of Carl Michael Bellman: Genius of the Swedish Rococo. New York: Allhem, Malmö American-Scandinavian Foundation. ISBN 978-3-932759-00-0.
- Burman, Carina (2019). Bellman. Biografin [Bellman. The Biography] (in Swedish). Stockholm: Albert Bonniers Förlag. ISBN 978-91-0-014179-0.
- Lönnroth, Lars (2005). Ljuva karneval! om Carl Michael Bellmans diktning (in Swedish). Stockholm: Bonniers. ISBN 91-0-057245-4.
