= Fredrik August Dahlgren =

Swedish writer, playwright and songwriter

F. A. Dahlgren (1851)

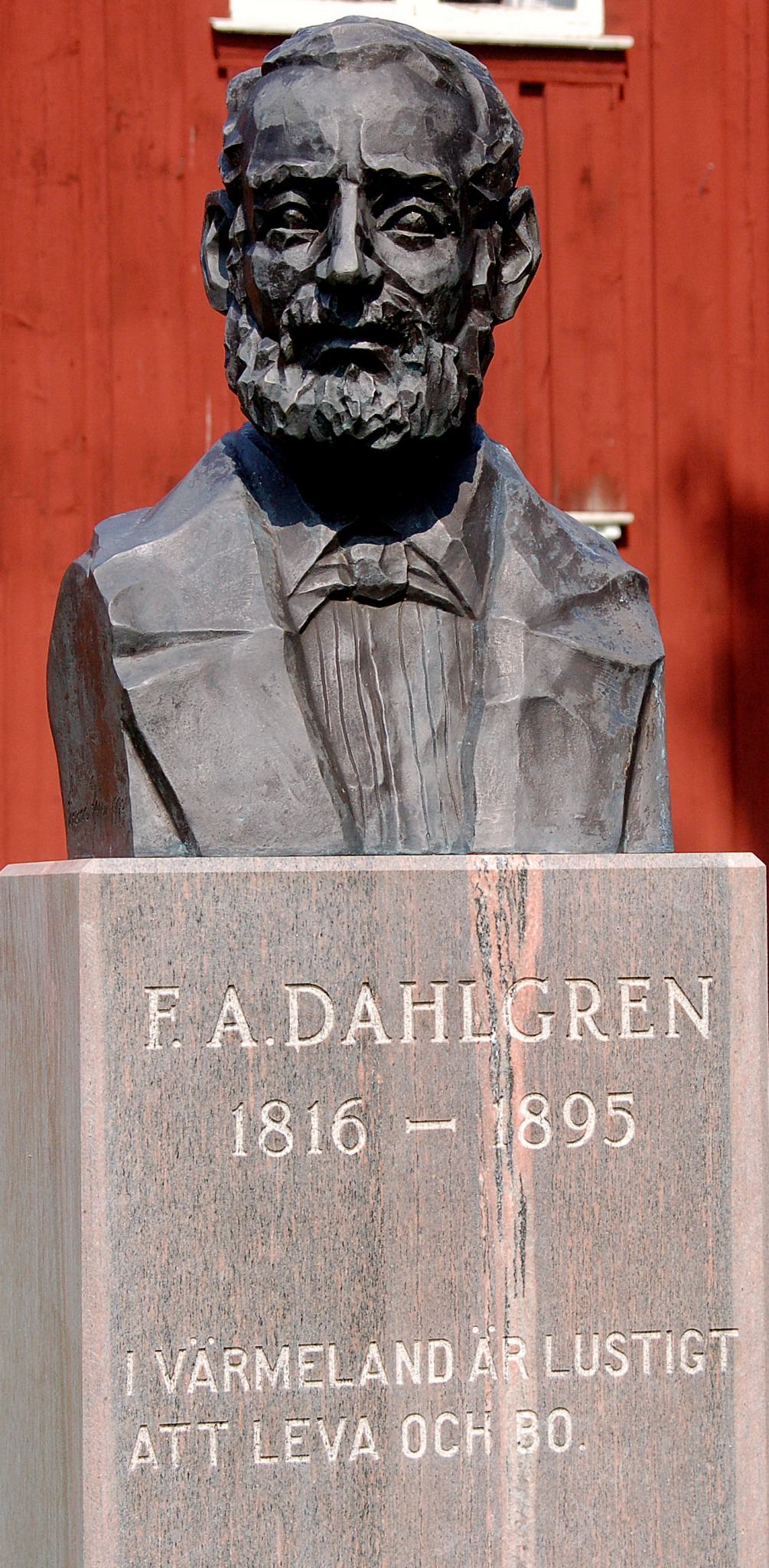
F. A. Dahlgren bust in Ransäter, Värmland

Fredrik August Dahlgren (20 September 1816 – 16 February 1895) was a Swedish writer, playwright and songwriter.

== Biography ==
Dahlgren was born in Nordmark parish in Värmland, Sweden. He was the son of Barthold Dahlgren, the manager of the mines at Taberg, and Anna Carolina Svensson. After finishing school at Karlstads gymnasium in Karlstad, he matriculated at Uppsala University in 1834, completing a filosofie magister degree in 1839.

In 1841, he was hired at the Ministry of Education and Ecclesiastical Affairs where he served until 1848. He served in the National Archives of Sweden from 1848. He became chancellor in 1862 and in 1871 secretary of the ecclesiastical ministry. In 1874, Dahlgren became Acting Head of the Office for Health and Poverty Affairs and Chancellor in 1878. He was a member of the Swedish Academy (1871–1895), where he occupied seat 6.

Dahlgren is best remembered for writing two popular Swedish folk songs. Together with Anders Fryxell (1795–1881), he wrote the lyrics to "Ack Värmeland, du sköna". He wrote the lyrics for the Värmland folk song "Jänta å ja". Dahlgren also wrote the text for the musical drama Värmlänningarna with music by composer Andreas Randel (1806–1864).

== Biography ==
He was married to Ulrika Magdalena von Heland (1818–1900). He was the father of the historian Erik Wilhelm Dahlgren (1848–1934), who became head of the National Library of Sweden, and the writer Lotten Dahlgren (1851–1934).

Dahlgren is buried at the Norra begravningsplatsen in Stockholm.

== Selected bibliography ==
- Wermlänningarne (Värmlänningarna) - 1846
- Viser på varmlanske tongmåle - 1886

Cultural offices
Preceded by Anders Abraham Grafström	Swedish Academy, Seat No.6; 1871 - 1895	Succeeded by Hans Hildebrand
