= Lars Lönnroth =

Swedish literary scholar (born 1935)

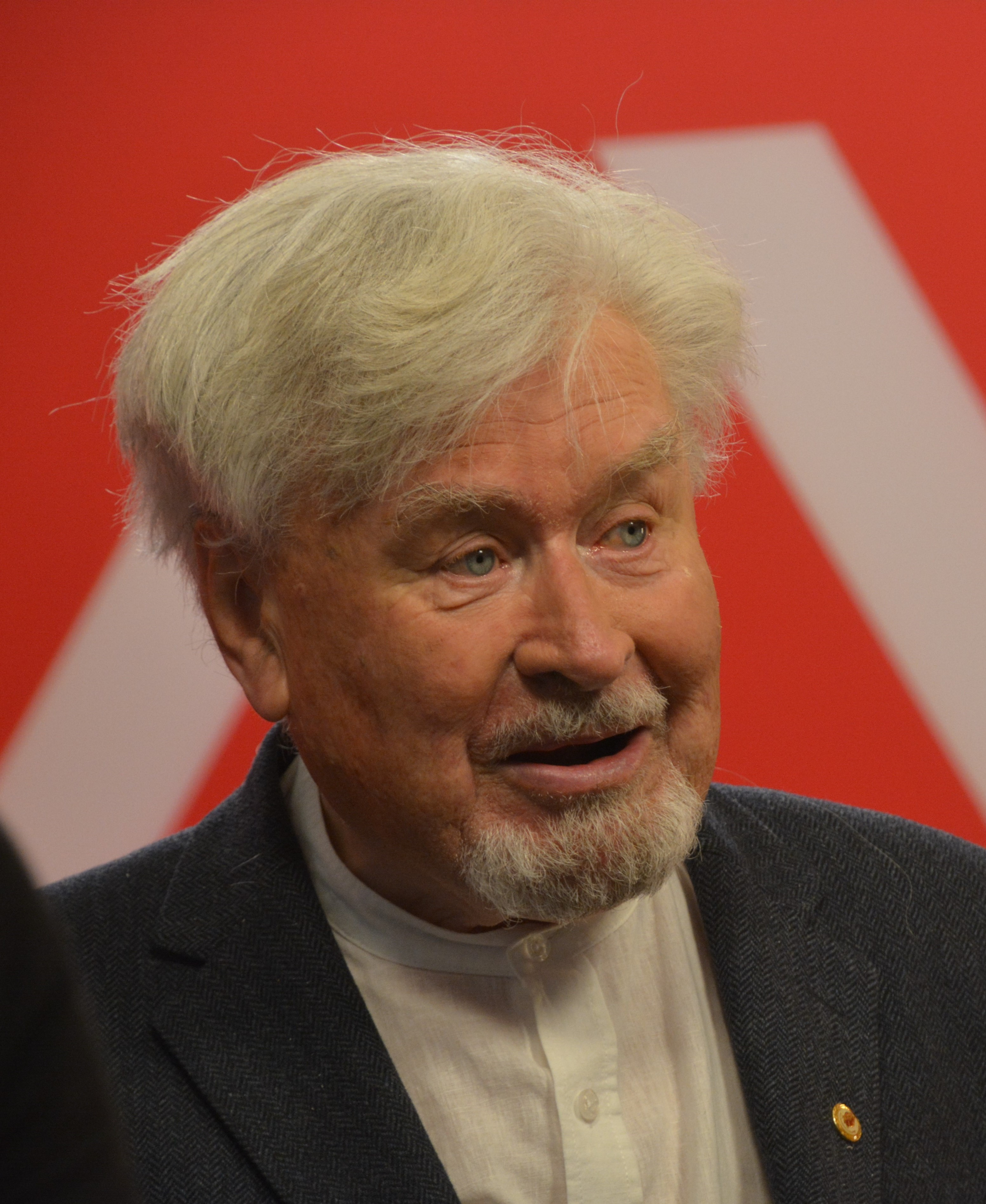
- At Gothenburg Book Fair, 2019
- Born: 4 June 1935 (age 90); Gothenburg, Sweden
- Occupation: literary scientist
- Parent: Erik Lönnroth
- Awards: Dobloug Prize

Lars Lönnroth (born 4 June 1935) is a Swedish literary scholar.

He was born in Gothenburg to Erik Lönnroth and Ebba Lagercrantz.

His academic career includes professorships at the University of California Berkeley, University of Aalborg and the University of Gothenburg.

== Career ==
Lönnroth gained his first degree at Uppsala University in 1961, and his PhD at Stockholm University in 1965. He became associate professor in Scandinavian Studies at University of California, Berkeley in 1965, and professor in literature and text science at Aalborg University in 1974. From 1982 to 2000, he was professor in literary studies at the University of Gothenburg, with a short break when he was Svenska Dagbladet's cultural director from 1991 to 1993. He was chairman of Statens konstnärsnämnd from 1995 to 2001, and chairman of Sällskapet Gnistan from 1999 to 2013.

Lönnroth's research has to a large extent dealt with the Icelandic medieval saga literature. Together with Sven Delblanc, he was editor of the seven-volume work "Swedish Literature" (1987–90). He has written numerous other books including the 2005 Ljuva karneval! on Sweden's 18th century bard, Carl Michael Bellman. He has published his memoirs and a personal book about his family heritage from the nationalist poet, historian and composer Erik Gustav Geijer onwards, a legacy marked by the "poetry and madness" of the book's subtitle.

Lönnroth was installed in 1993 as an honorary member of the Södermanlands-Nerikes nation in Uppsala. He is an honorary member of the Society of Swedish Literature in Finland, a member of the Royal Norwegian Society of Sciences and Letters, the Royal Gustavus Adolphus Academy, and the Royal Society of Arts and Sciences in Gothenburg.

== Reception ==
Reviewing the Festschrift written in his honour in 2000, Ulf Malm described Lönnroth as "the energetically combative and polemically gifted literature professor from Gothenburg".

=== Ljuva karneval! ===
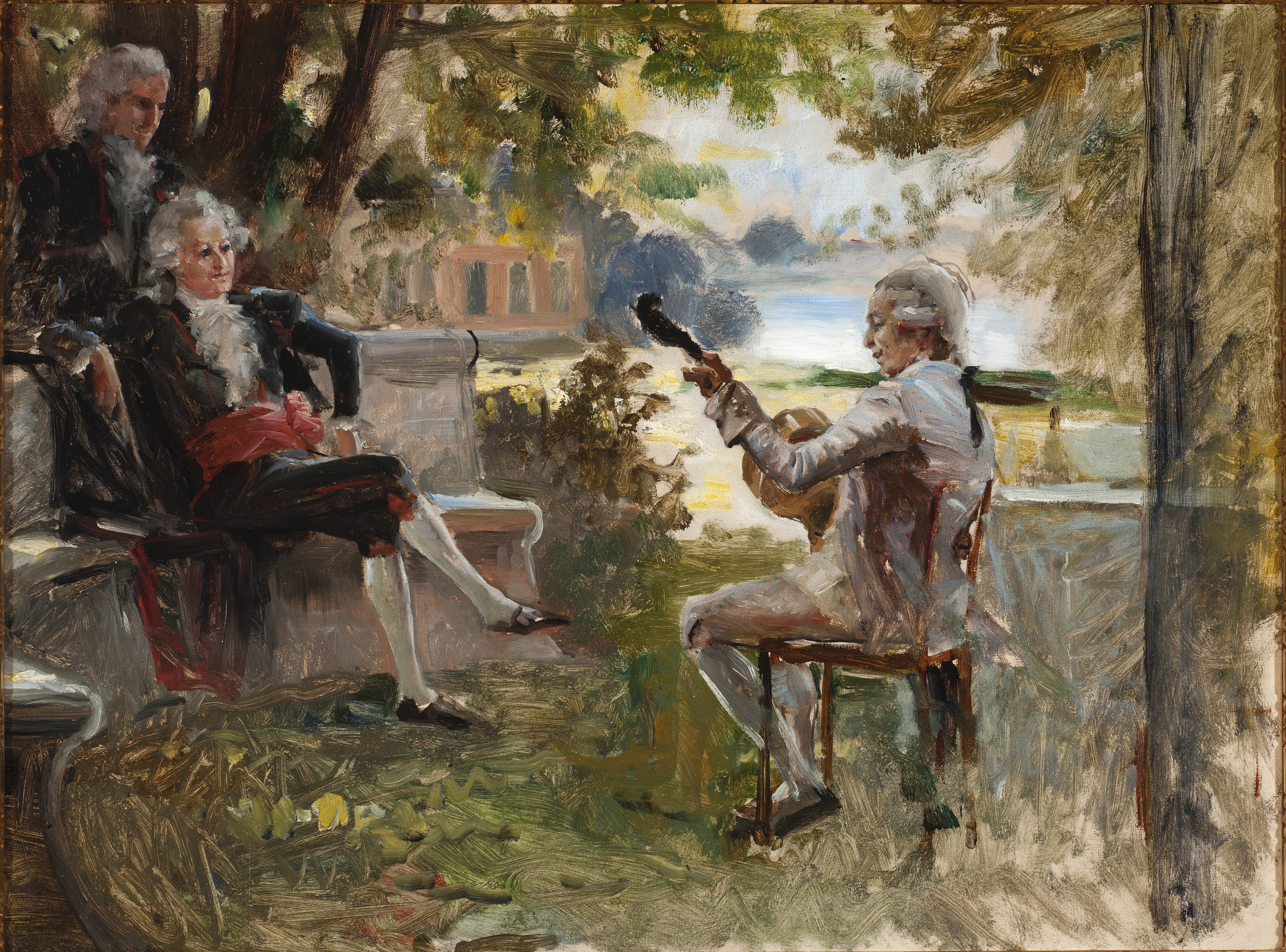
Lönnroth's Ljuva karneval! shows that Carl Michael Bellman was above all an entertainer, playing many roles. Painting of Bellman entertaining King Gustav III, by Albert Edelfelt, 1884

In Ljuva karneval!, written after some 40 years of research, Lönnroth dispels the dominant 200 year old myth created by Johan Henric Kellgren that Bellman was always speaking for himself in his best-known work, Fredman's Epistles. The book explains that the reverse was the case; Bellman uninterruptedly played carefully-crafted roles, including troubadour, court dramatist, and satirist. The book presents Bellman as a skilful performance artist with an experimental, genre-crossing creativity. Fredman's Epistles necessarily take a central place in the book, but it offers much fresh detail on Bellman's lesser-known works, such as Bacchi Tempel.

== Family ==
Lars is the brother of the politician Johan Lönnroth, the nephew of the author Olof Lagercrantz, and cousin of the actress Marika Lagercrantz and the journalist and author David Lagercrantz.

== Works ==
=== In English ===
- 1965 – European Sources of Icelandic Saga-Writing
- 1976 – Njáls saga: A Critical Introduction
- 1977 – The Riddles of the Rök-Stone: A Structural Approach
- 2011 – The Academy of Odin: Selected Papers on Old Norse Literature

=== In Swedish ===
- 1961 – Litteraturforskningens dilemma
- 1978 – Den dubbla scenen
- 1983 – Faust i Göteborg
- 1996 – Skaldemjödet i berget
- 2001 – Tegnér och det nordiskt sublima
- 2005 – Ljuva Karneval! Om Carl Michael Bellmans diktning
- 2006 – Njals saga (translation, introduction)
- 2009 – Dörrar till främmande rum. Minnesfragment
- 2017 – Det germanska spåret. En västerländsk litteraturtradition från Tacitus till Tolkien
- 2019 – Geijerarvet. En släkthistoria om dikt och galenskap

==== Translations ====
- 1995 – Isländska mytsagor (with commentary)
- 2014 – Laxdalingarnas saga
- 2016 – Den poetiska Eddan (with introduction and commentary)

== Awards and distinctions ==
- 1971 – Guggenheim Fellow
- 1986 – Schück prize from the Swedish Academy
- 1995 – Rettig prize
- 2000 – Tegnér prize
- 2005 – Dobloug prize
- 2005 – John Landquist prize
- 2007 – Knight of the Order of the Falcon (Iceland)
- 2008 – Nils Ahnlund prize
- 2016 – Swedish Academy's Extra prize
- 2021 - Honorary doctorate at Háskóli Íslands (Iceland's University)
