= Ramdala =

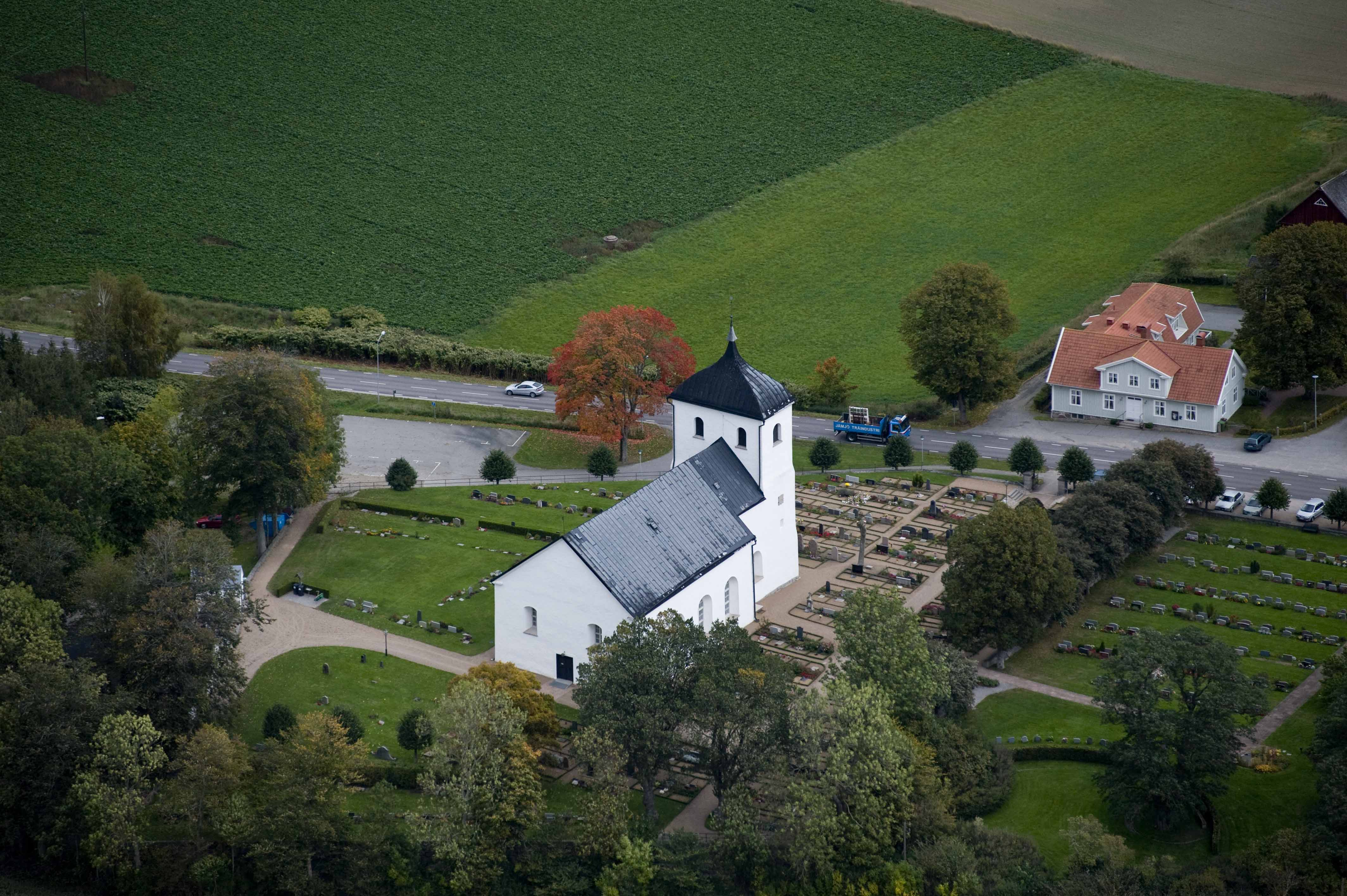
- Ramdala church from above

- Location within Blekinge Location within Sweden
- Coordinates: 56°11′07″N 15°45′49″E
- Country: Sweden
- Province: Blekinge
- County: Blekinge County
- Municipality: Karlskrona Municipality

Area
  - Total: 0.42 km^{2} (0.16 sq mi)

Population (31 December 2010)
  - Total: 217
  - Density: 518/km^{2} (1,340/sq mi)
- Time zone: UTC+1 (CET)
  - Summer (DST): UTC+2 (CEST)

Ramdala (Swedish pronunciation: [ˈrâmːˌdɑːla]) is a locality situated in Karlskrona Municipality, Blekinge County, Sweden with 217 inhabitants in 2010.
