= Johan Fredrik Martin =

18th century Swedish painter and engraver

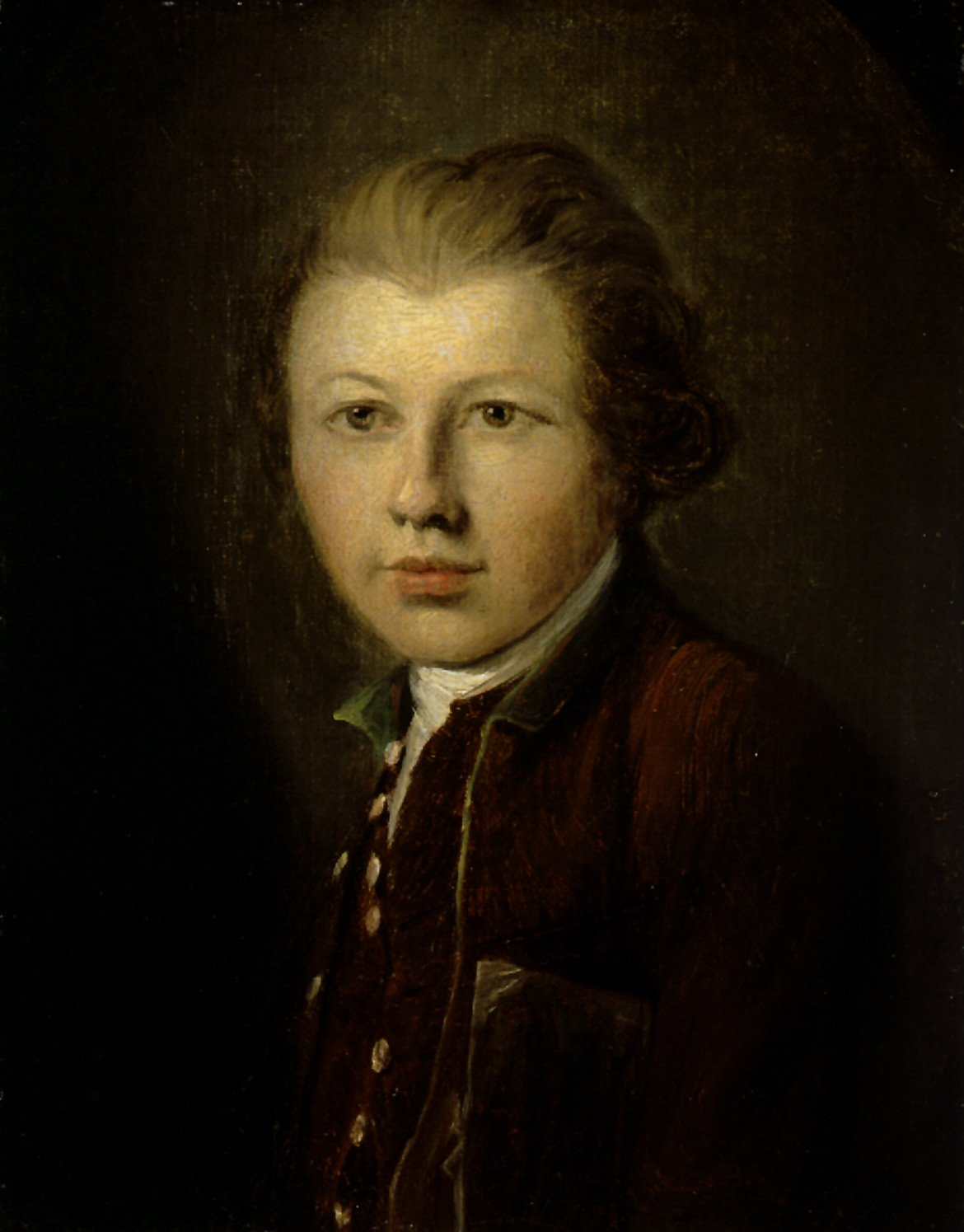
- As a young man, by his brother Elias Martin. Finnish National Gallery
- Born: 6 June 1755; Stockholm, Sweden
- Died: 28 September 1816 (aged 61)
- Resting place: Sankt Johannes churchyard
- Known for: Paintings, drawings, engravings
- Relatives: Elias Martin (brother)

Johan Fredrik Martin (8 June 1755 – 28 September 1816) was a Swedish painter and engraver of the eighteenth century. He worked in a variety of media, especially stipple, contour etching and aquatint.

== Biography ==
Martin was born in Stockholm, Sweden. He was the son of Olof Martin and Ulrika Haupt. The famous landscape painter Elias Martin (1739–1818) was his elder brother; both men had sons who were also painters.

In his youth Martin devoted himself primarily to the art of drawing. He spent the years 1770–1780 in England and received his education there from English graphic artists including William Woollett and Francesco Bartolozzi. At first he worked very close to his brother Elias, but after 1785 he became more independent and made graphic prints for other artists, among them Pehr Hilleström. After his return to Sweden he made graphic works such as Svenska galeriet (2 booklets with 12 portraits and biographies 1782–83). When Elias made a complete set of drawings for Carl Michael Bellman's song play Bacchi Tempel (The Temple of Bacchus), Johan Fredrik engraved them; both were "close friends" with Bellman.

In 1784–87 Martin undertook several journeys through Sweden to subscribe prospects. In 1797 he published the collection Utsigter över Stockholm (Prospects of Stockholm), made with contour etchings which he hand-coloured with watercolours; these were widely sold. In 1805 he began to develop these and similar drawings in aquatint, and his great work, Svenska vyer arose gradually. His other works include the engraved plates to shield Brands Voyage pittoresque au Cap Nord, as well as plates from Louis Masreliez drawings, his brother Elias's landscape paintings and his drawings of the Bacchus temple. He also made many portraits and engravings on a wide variety of subjects.

Martin was technically very skilled, working in several graphic techniques, especially stipple, contour etching and aquatint. Among his works is the "beautifying theatre view" from the Södermalm district of Stockholm with upper-class audience that is a watercoloured etching after a drawing by his brother Elias from about 1790.

== Works ==
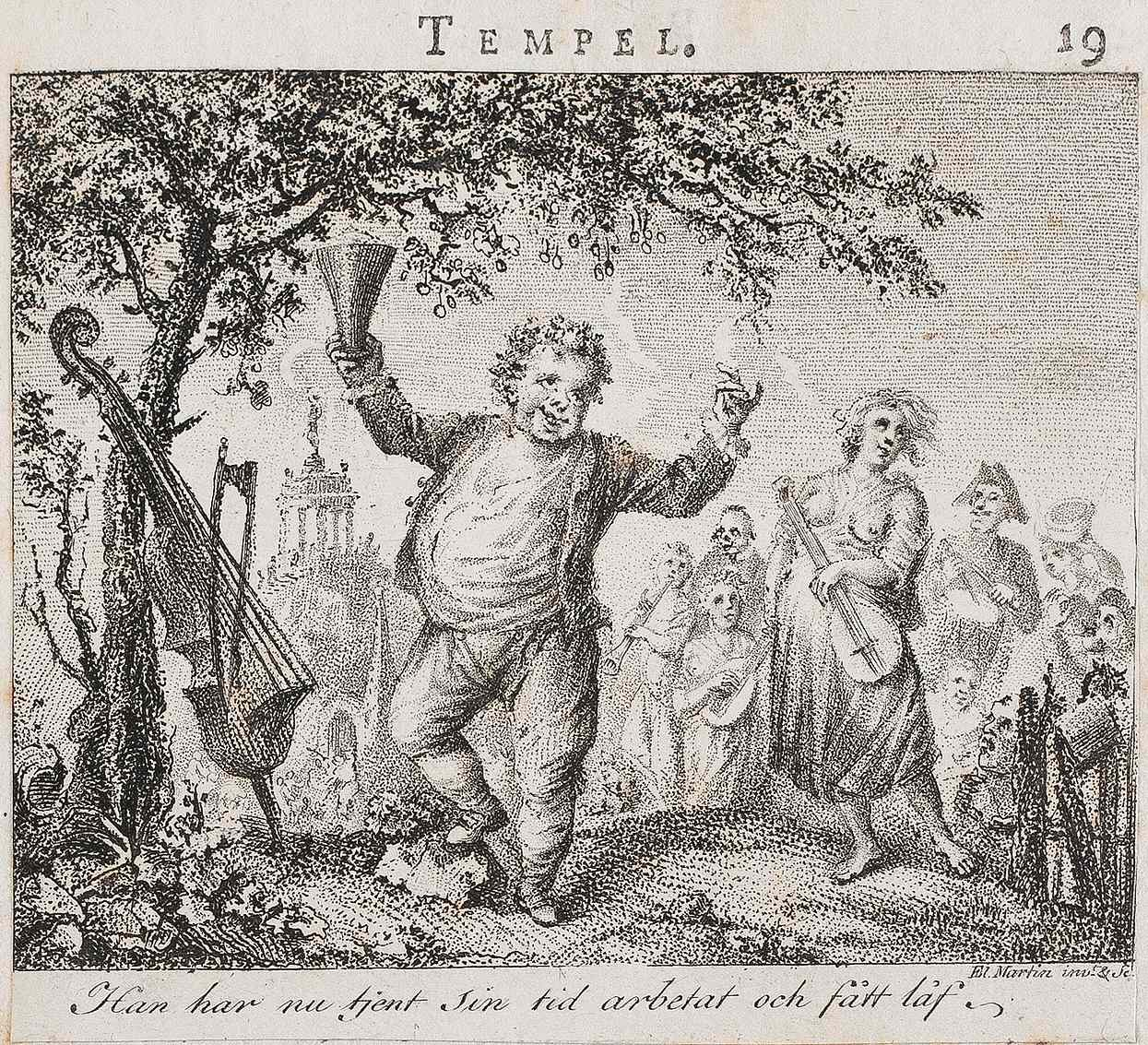
Illustration in Carl Michael Bellman's Bacchi Tempel, 1783, drawn by Elias Martin, engraved by Johan Fredrik

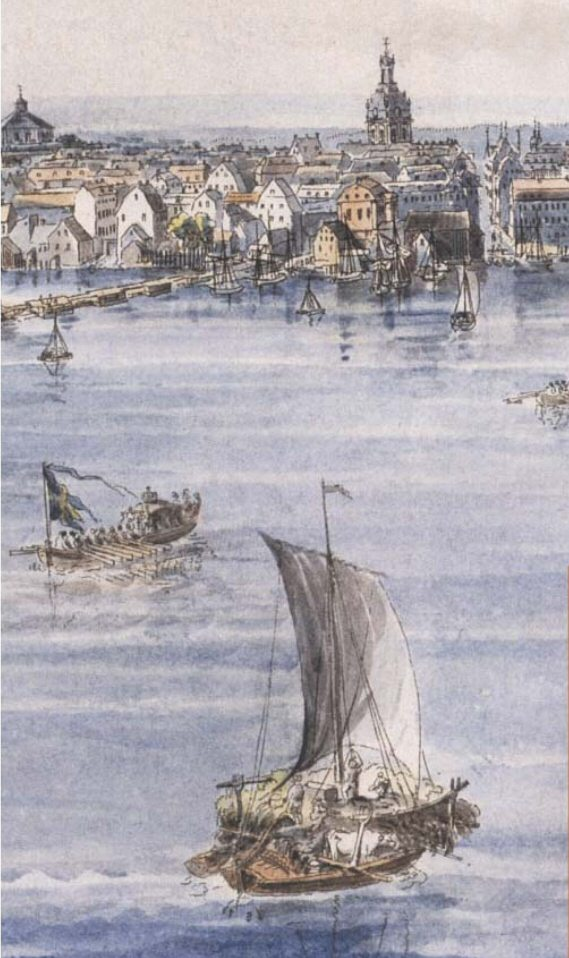
Hayboat coming into Stockholm: detail. 1780s

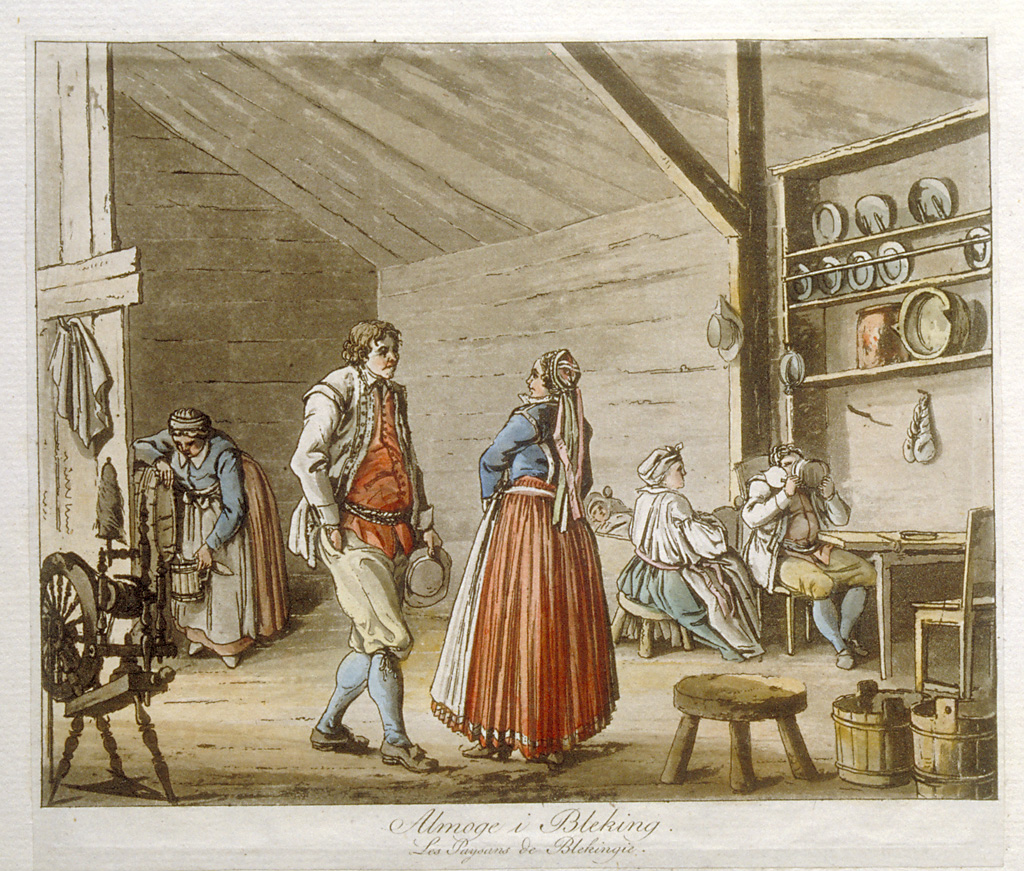
Aquatint over contour etching Country people in Blekinge, c. 1800, after original by Pehr Hilleström

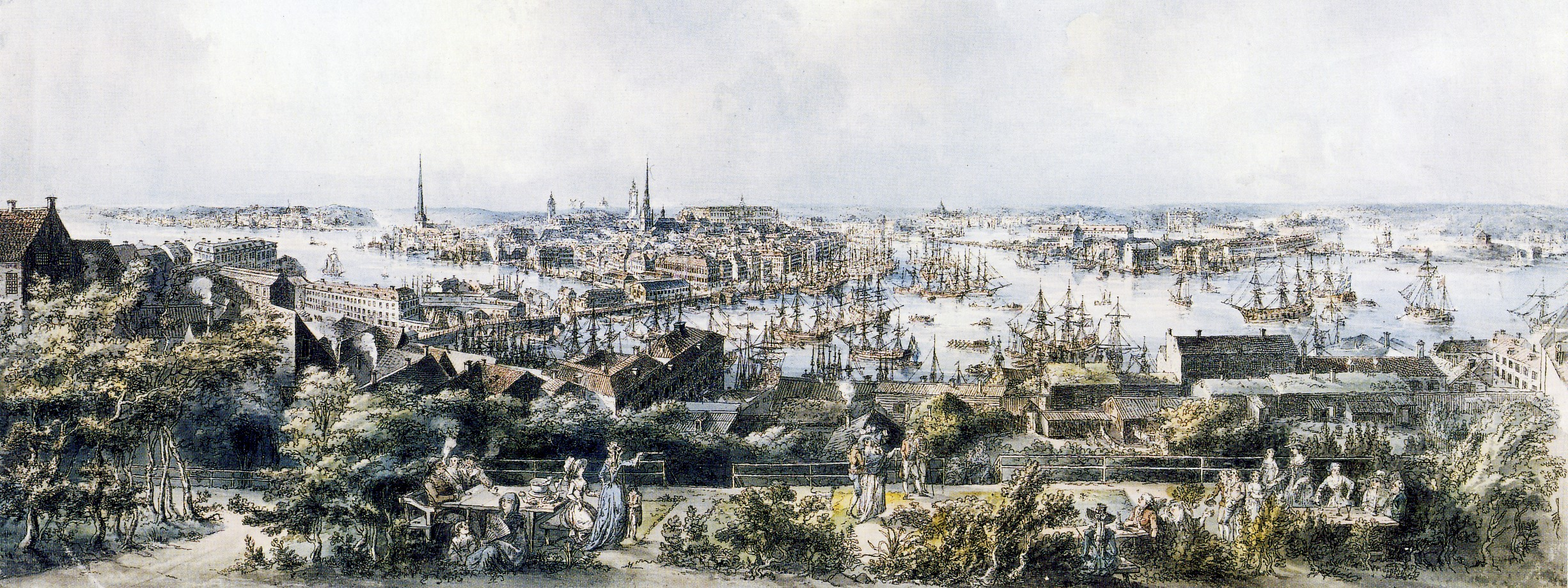
Detail of view of Stockholm from Mosebacke in Södermalm. This image was a watercoloured etching in the collection Utsigter över Stockholm (Prospects of Stockholm, 1797). An aquatint variant was published as the first sheet in the series Svenska vyer of 1805.

== Sources ==
- Britten Austin, Paul (1967). The Life and Songs of Carl Michael Bellman: Genius of the Swedish Rococo. New York: Allhem, Malmö American-Scandinavian Foundation. ISBN 978-3-932759-00-0.
- Frölich, Hans (1939). Bröderna Elias och Johan Fredrik Martins gravyrer (in Swedish). Thule.
- Martin, Johan Fredrik in Svenskt biografiskt handlexikon, 1906
- "Biography". Nordisk familjebok (2nd ed.). 1912 – via Project Runeberg.
