= Elias Martin =

Swedish painter and engraver

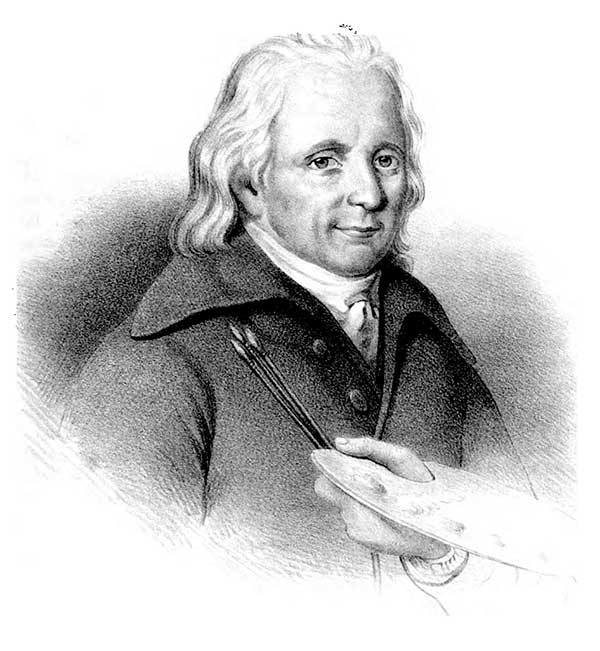
- Engraving by Henrik Wallgren
- Born: 8 March 1739
- Died: 25 January 1818 (aged 78)
- Known for: History painting landscape

Elias Martin ARA (8 March 1739 – 25 January 1818) was a Swedish genre, history, and landscape painter and engraver from Stockholm. He is known for his watercolour paintings of Stockholm, and his landscape oil paintings that feature romantic lighting effects. Nationalencyklopedin describes him as Sweden's "first great landscape painter".

== Early life ==
Martin's father was a carpenter who wanted his son to work in carpentry. Martin, however, was more interested in art, and decided to become an apprentice of the Swedish court painter Friedrich Schultz. During his time with Schultz, he was hired by the naval architect Fredrik Henrik af Chapman to design ship ornaments. This job led to an acquaintanceship with Augustin Ehrensvärd, a lieutenant colonel in the artillery and a painter, who brought Martin to the sea fortress of Sveaborg and encouraged him to pursue his painting.

Martin stayed at Sveaborg, an island fortress near Helsinki, for two years and painted several paintings of the fortress and its surroundings under Ehrensvärd's supervision. He gave drawing lessons to the garrison officers and Ehrensvärd's son, Carl August Ehrensvärd.

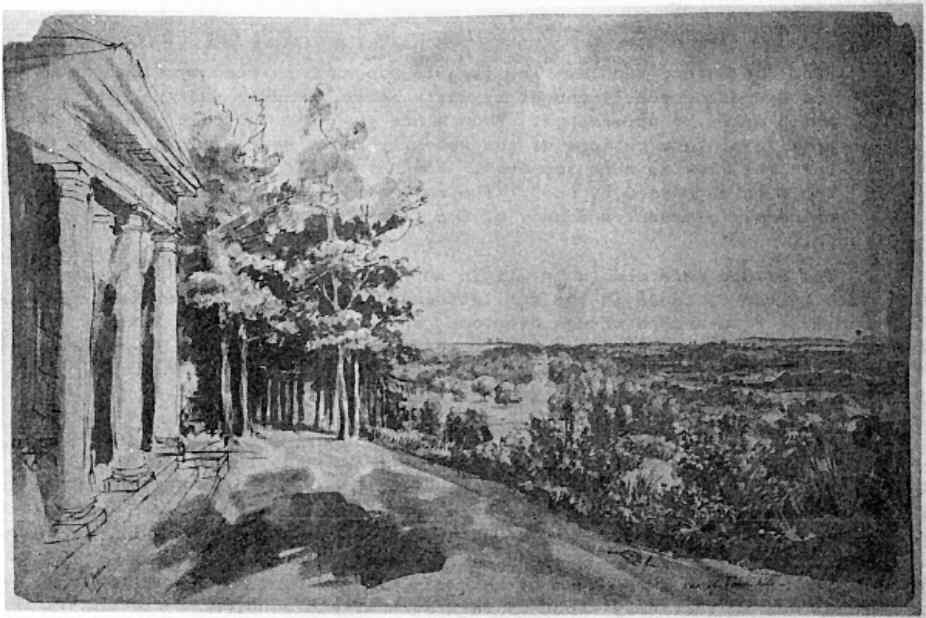
View from the Temple of Bacchus, Painshill Park, c. 1770

In May 1766, Martin travelled to Le Havre and Paris in France where he mostly worked on his own. He tried to copy the style of François Boucher, but quickly realized that it did not suit him. Finding that he did not wish to follow French classicism, he moved to London. He may have briefly visited Rome before his move. He probably studied at the Royal Academy soon after it was founded in 1768; he exhibited two drawings and two paintings there in 1769.

In England, Martin spent most of his time on landscape painting, receiving inspiration from Claude Lorrain and the English landscape school. He painted several paintings in this style, but also experimented with portraits, genre paintings, and history paintings.

== Career ==
Among Martin's most famous works from this time are the paintings he made in the Bodleian Library in Oxford. These include Britomartis befriande Amoret ur trollqvinnans våld (English: Britomart frees Amor from the witch's possession; based on Edmund Spenser's epic poem The Faerie Queene) and Arkebiskop Langton, som af konungen erhåller en handling.

Martin gained a good reputation in England for his paintings, and he became an Associate of the Royal Academy. In 1781 he earned a membership at the Royal Swedish Academy of Arts, and a year later he travelled to Sweden. He went ashore in Helsingborg and passed through Lund, Karlskrona, and Kalmar before arriving in Stockholm. On his journey he saw many views that he later depicted in watercolour and oils. Martin stayed in Stockholm for several years, creating paintings, drawings, and engravings to order. Some of his foremost paintings from this period include Midsommarfest, Hertigens af Småland döpelseakt i slottskapellet (1782), Gustaf III:s och hertig Fredrik Adolfs besök i Målare- och bildhuggare-akademien, Uppsala (1784; given to Pope Pius VI), Gripsholm (1784), Engelska parken vid Drottningholm (1785), Stockholm från Mosebacke (1786–87).

In 1788 Martin once again travelled to England, where he first stayed in London and then in Bath. In the summer of 1791 he was recalled to Sweden by King Gustav III. He remained there until his death. During his final years in Stockholm, Martin produced engravings and paintings, primarily depicting landscapes, in watercolour and oils. He also became an art teacher.

Martin died in Stockholm on 25 January 1818. His younger brother, Johan Fredrik Martin, was also a painter; he engraved some of Elias's works.

== Works ==
Westminster Bridge and the Thames Procession of King Christian VII of Denmark, 1769

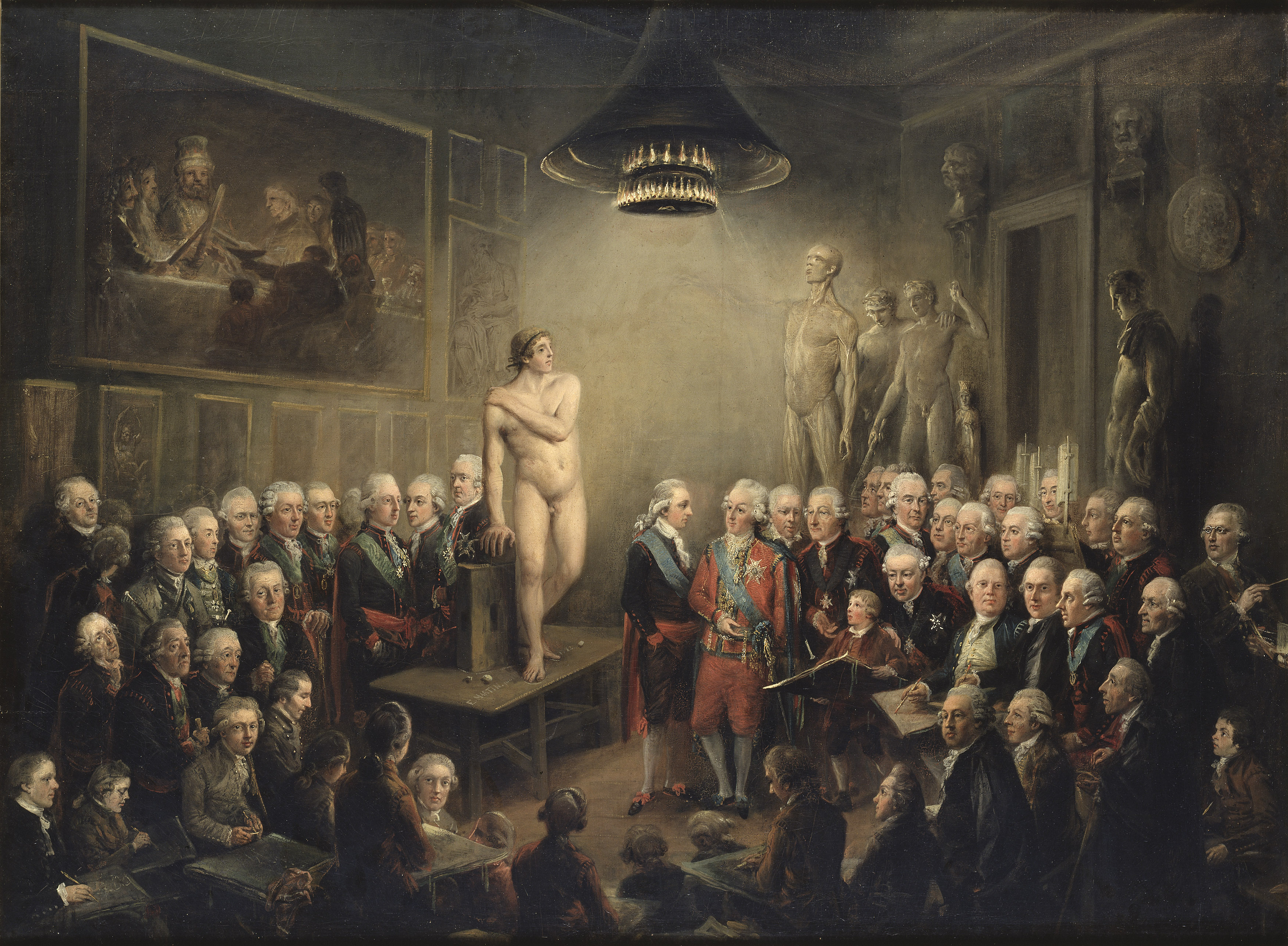
1782 oil painting of Gustav III's visit to the Royal Swedish Academy of Fine Arts

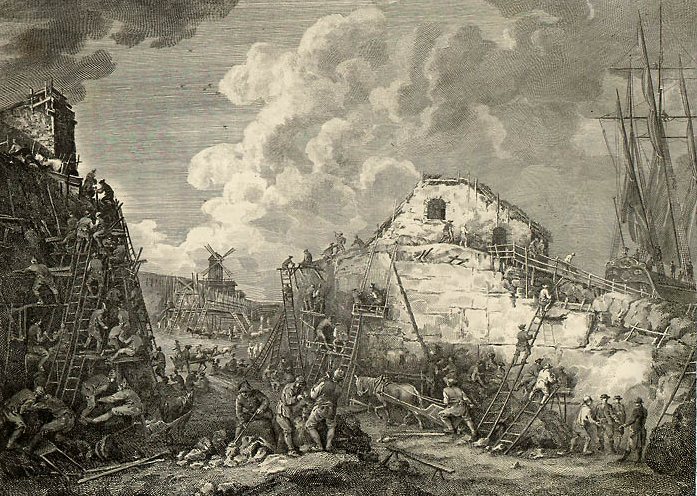
A 1782 drawing of the galley docks of Sveaborg fortress during their construction

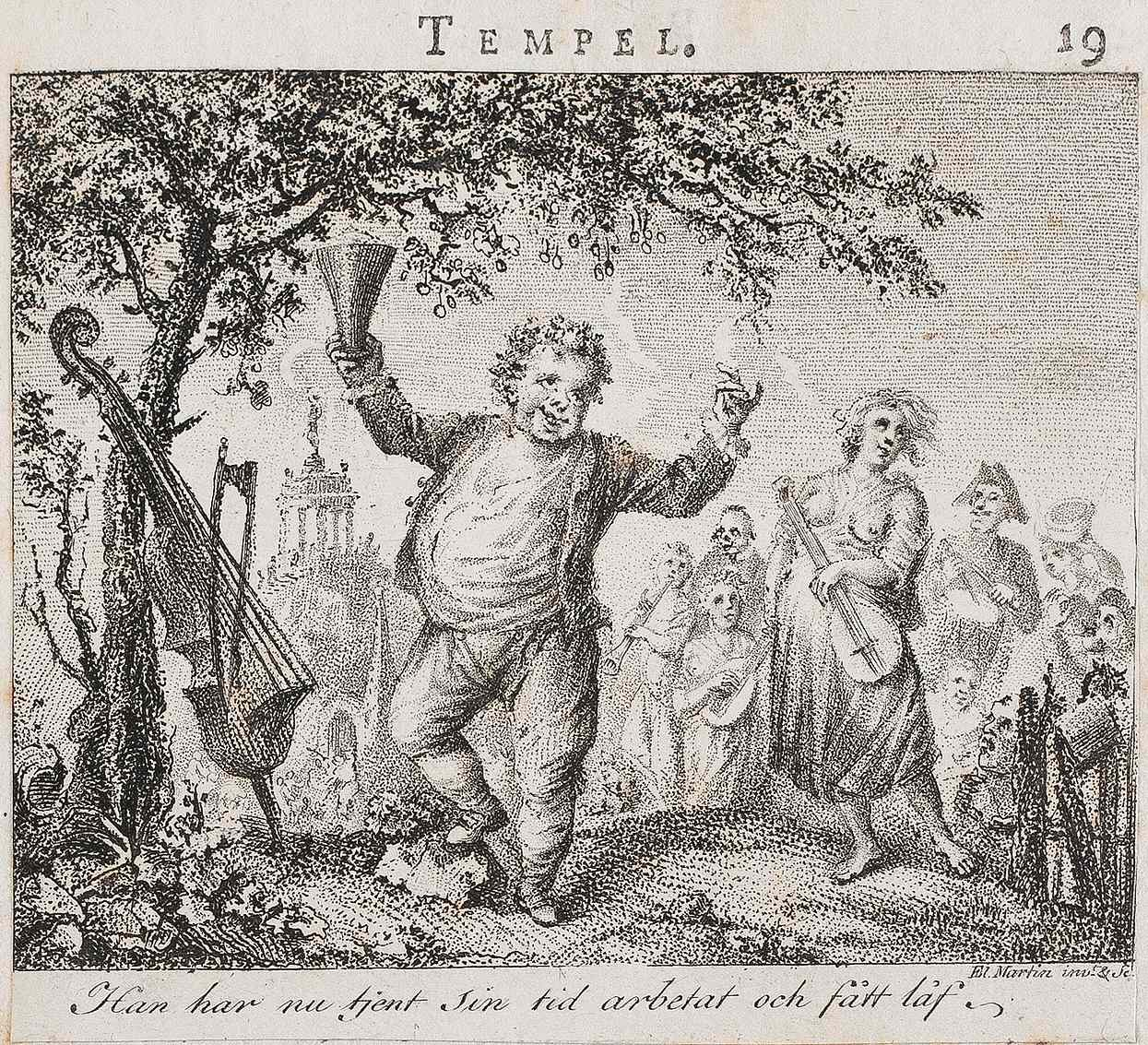
Drunken celebrations by the "Order of Bacchus". Illustration for Carl Michael Bellman's Bacchi Tempel, 1783, engraved by Johan Fredrik Martin

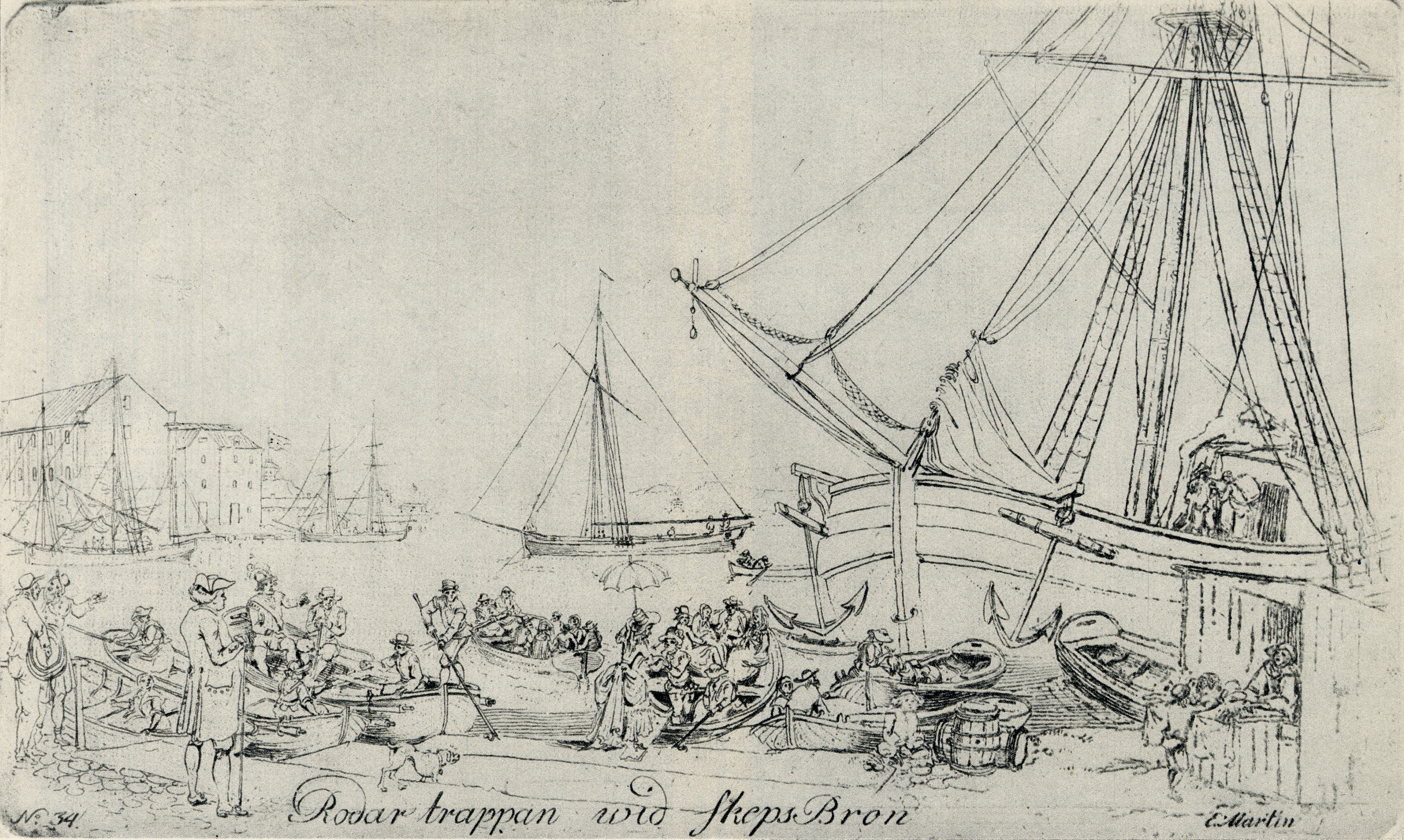
1800 etching, "The steps on Skeppsbro", Stockholm, supposedly depicting Carl Michael Bellman's fictional muse, Ulla Winblad

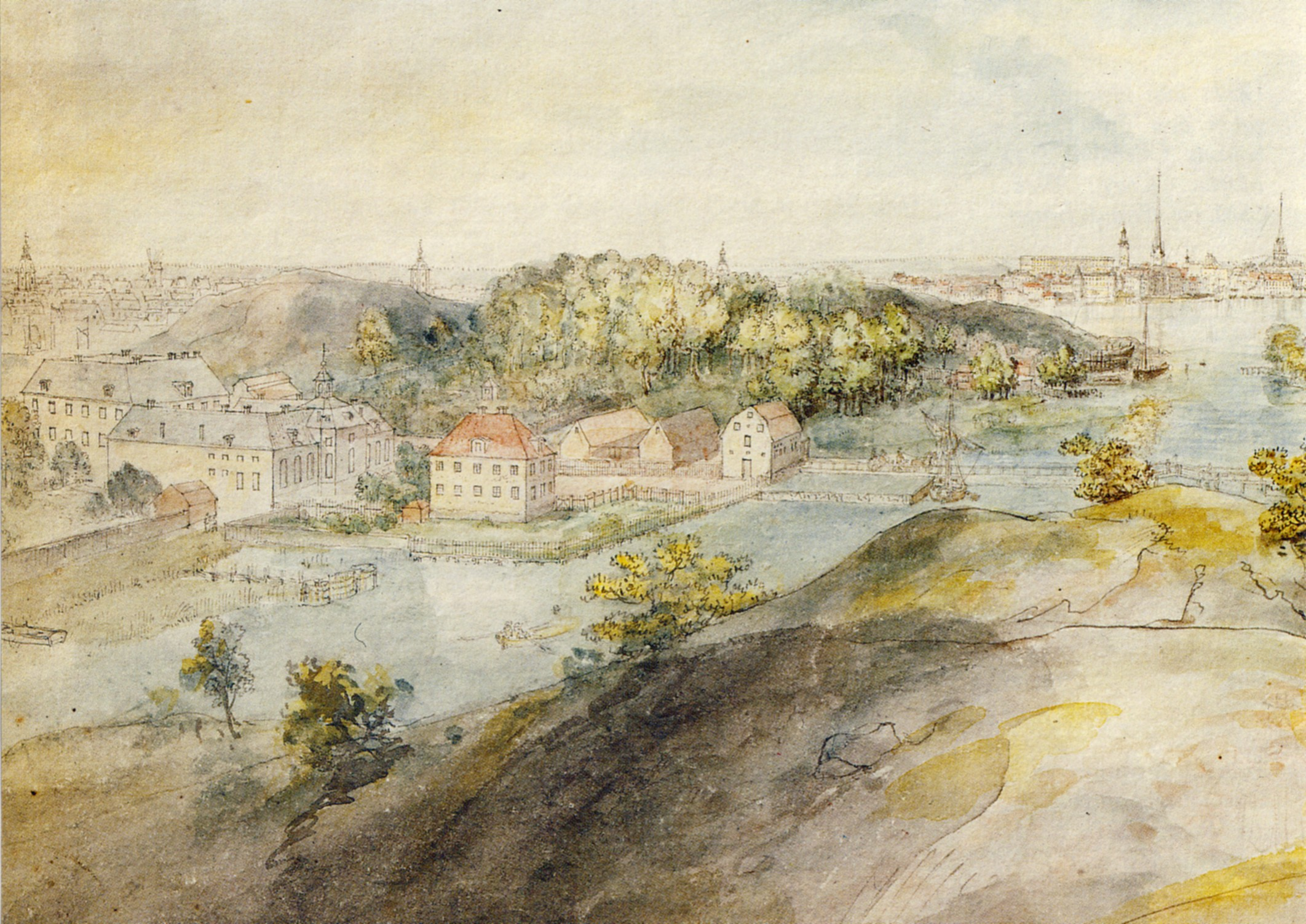
A 1787 watercolour of Långholmen in Stockholm

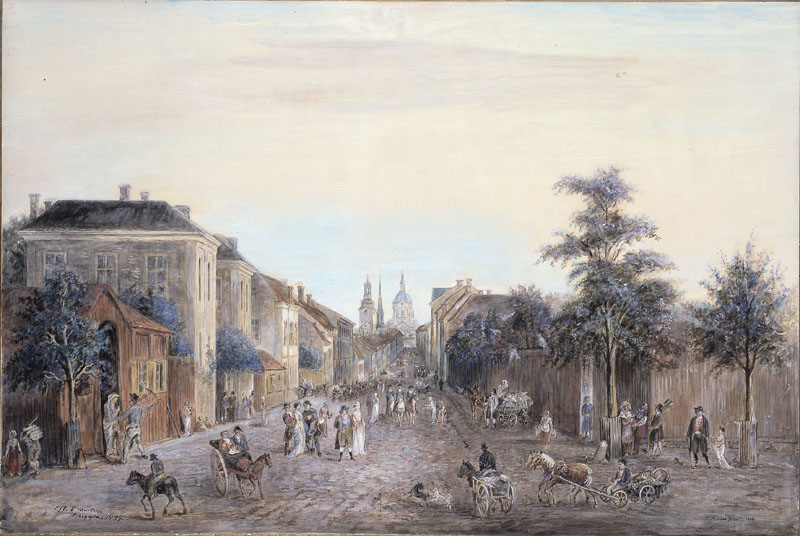
An 1808 painting by Martin of Drottninggatan, Stockholm

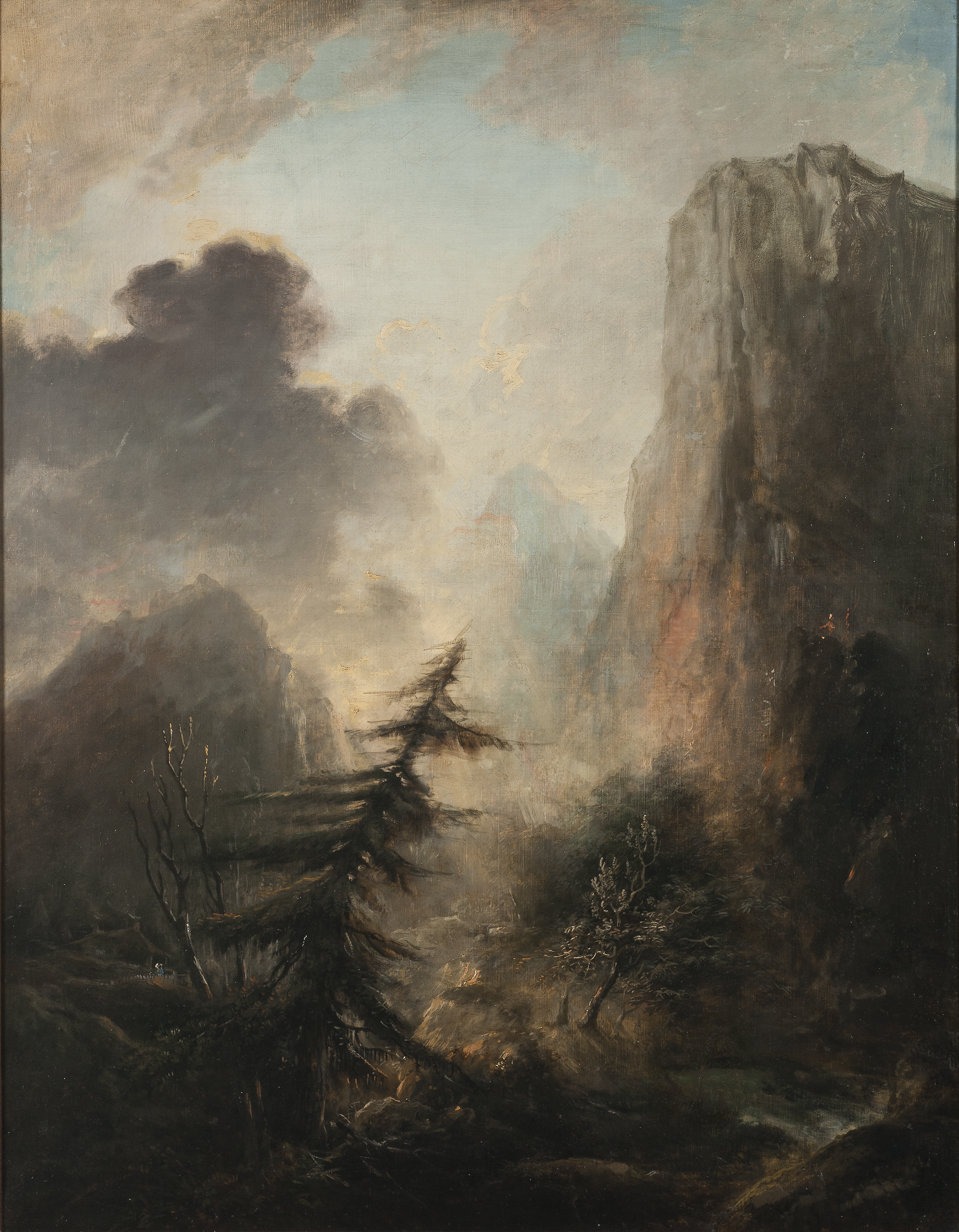
"Romantic Landscape with Spruce" (1768–1780)

== Sources ==
- Britten Austin, Paul (1967). The Life and Songs of Carl Michael Bellman: Genius of the Swedish Rococo. New York: Allhem, Malmö American-Scandinavian Foundation. ISBN 978-3-932759-00-0.
- Hoppe, Ragnar (1933). Elias Martin (in Swedish). P.A. Norstedt & söner.
- Cust, Lionel Henry (1893). "Martin, Elias" . In Lee, Sidney (ed.). Dictionary of National Biography. Vol. 36. London: Smith, Elder & Co.
- Attribution: This article contains content from the 1886 edition of Nordisk familjebok, a Swedish encyclopedia now in the public domain.
