= Opp Amaryllis! =

Swedish song

- Art song
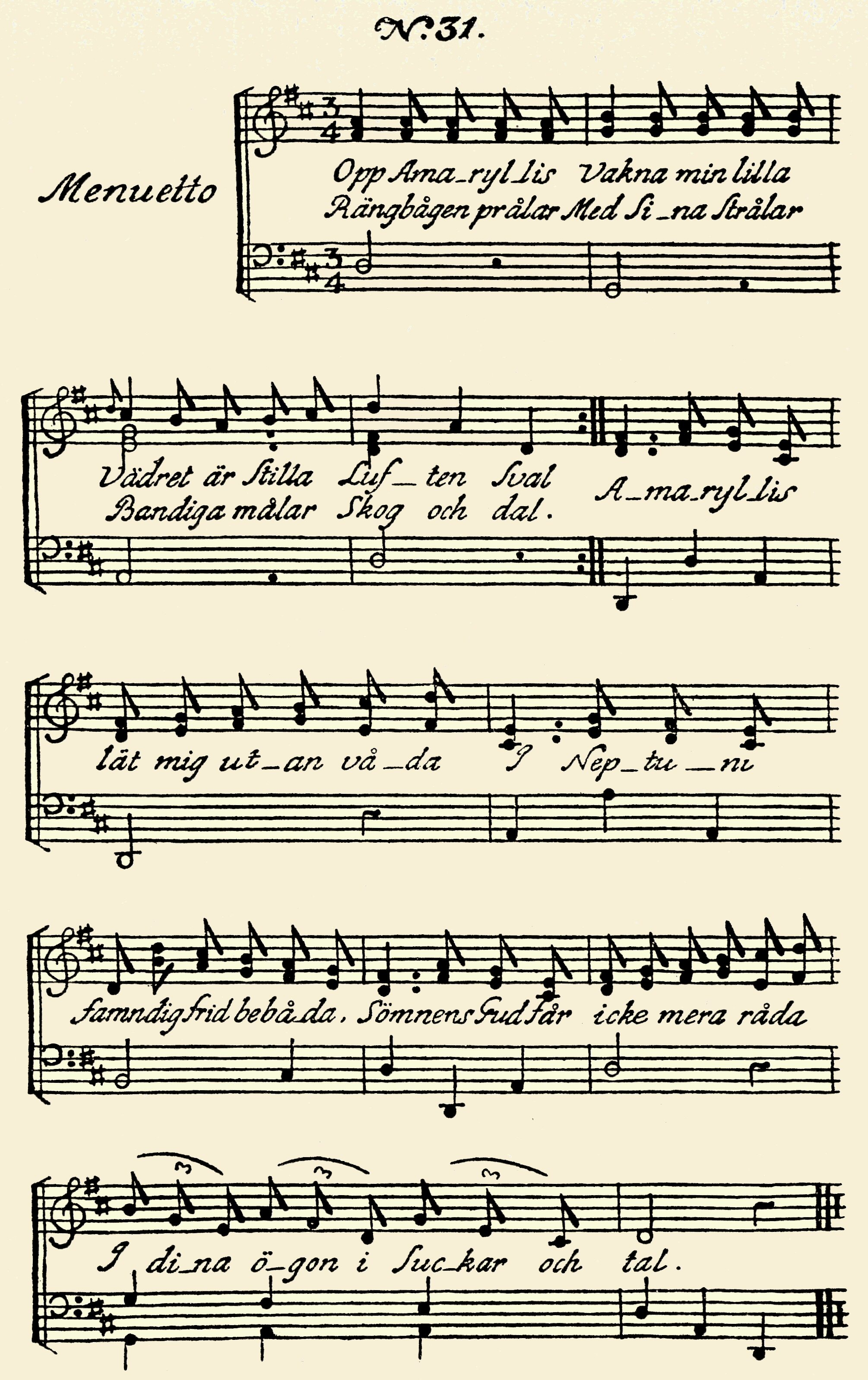
- Sheet music
- English: Up, Amaryllis!
- Written: 1773
- Text: poem by Carl Michael Bellman
- Language: Swedish
- Published: 1791 in Fredman's Songs
- Scoring: voice and cittern

Opp Amaryllis! (Up, Amaryllis!) is one of the Swedish poet and performer Carl Michael Bellman's songs from his 1791 collection, Fredman's Songs, where it is No. 31. The song is a graceful pastorale in rococo style, involving a sleeping nymph who is invited to come fishing upon the sea's stormy wave. In reality, the nymph is a Swedish woman, Wilhelmina Norman, the stormy wave is a Swedish waterway, and the progression from shore to fishing-boat can equally well be read as a seduction. It is one of Bellman's best-known and best-loved songs, and has been recorded by musicians including Folke Andersson and Edvard Andreasson.

== Context ==
Carl Michael Bellman is a central figure in the Swedish ballad tradition and a powerful influence in Swedish music, known for his 1790 Fredman's Epistles and his 1791 Fredman's Songs. A solo entertainer, he played the cittern, accompanying himself as he performed his songs at the royal court.

Jean Fredman (1712 or 1713–1767) was a real watchmaker of Bellman's Stockholm. The fictional Fredman, alive after 1767, but without employment, is the supposed narrator in Bellman's epistles and songs. The epistles, written and performed in different styles, from drinking songs and laments to pastorales, paint a complex picture of the life of the city during the 18th century. A frequent theme is the demimonde, with Fredman's cheerfully drunk Order of Bacchus, a loose company of ragged men who favour strong drink and prostitutes. At the same time as depicting this realist side of life, Bellman creates a rococo picture, full of classical allusion, following the French post-Baroque poets. The women, including the beautiful Ulla Winblad, are "nymphs", while Neptune's festive troop of followers and sea-creatures sport in Stockholm's waters. The juxtaposition of elegant and low life is humorous, sometimes burlesque, but always graceful and sympathetic. The songs are "most ingeniously" set to their music, which is nearly always borrowed and skilfully adapted. The eponymous character Amaryllis is taken from classical tales. In Ancient Greek literature, Theocritus's Idylls portray a goatherd singing a serenade outside the cave of the nymph Amaryllis. In Ancient Roman literature, Amaryllis was a heroine in Virgil's Eclogues, a suite of pastoral poems.

== Song ==
=== Melody and verse form ===
Melody of Fredman's Song 31
Bellman's 3/4 time melody for "Opp Amaryllis!"

The song is in 3/4 time and is marked Menuetto. It has 4 verses, each consisting of 11 lines; lines 2-7 are short. The rhyming pattern of each verse is AA-B-CCC-B-DDD-B. No source has been identified for the melody, which may well have been composed by Bellman himself.

=== Lyrics ===
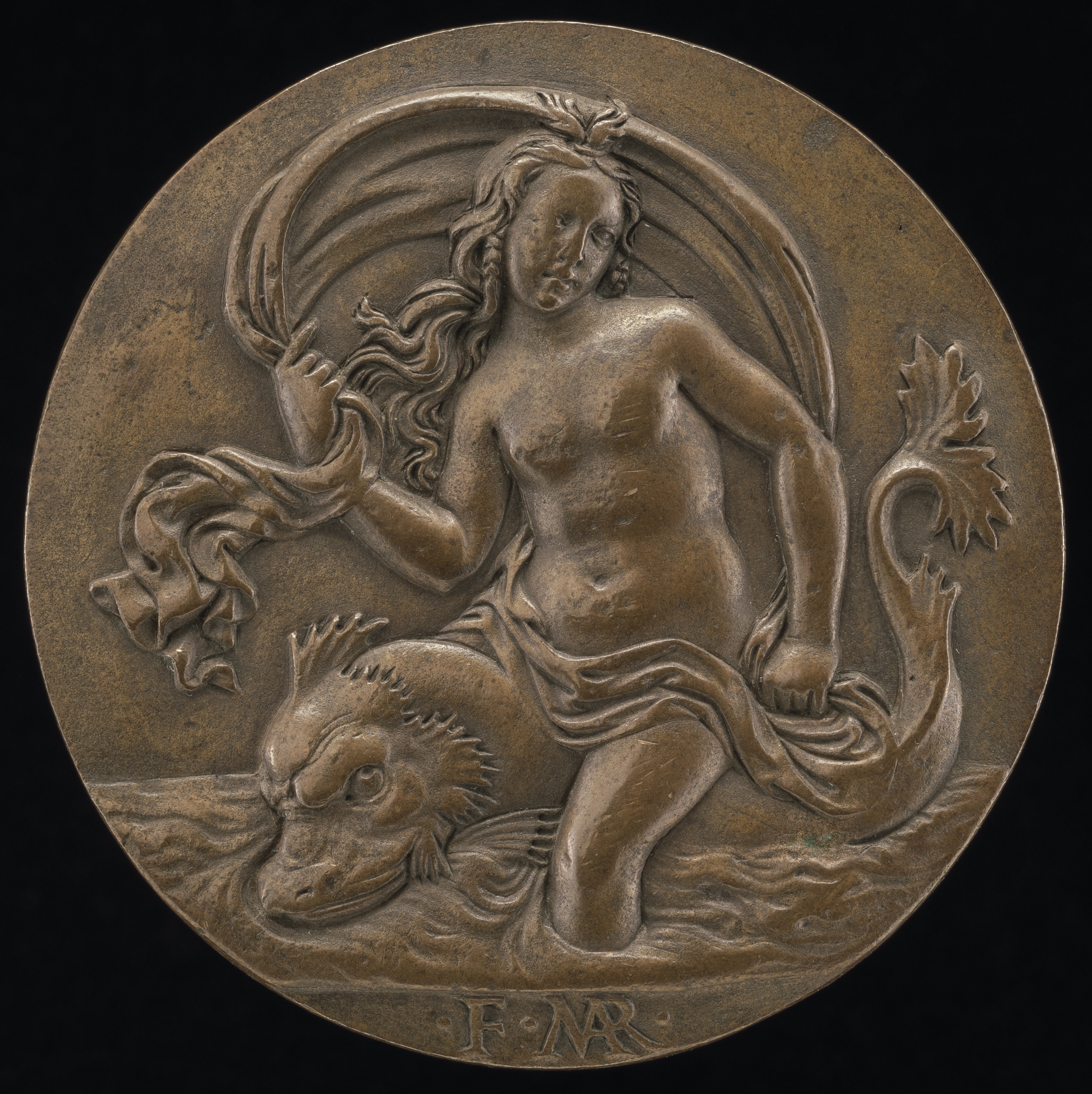
The song in rococo style invokes classical images of the sea, with nymphs and dolphins. Medallion by Francesco Marti, A Nymph on a Dolphin, c. 1500

The song, headed "Om fiskafänget" ("About catching fish"), is dated 1773, and was written for Bellman's opera Fiskarena. The song invites the sleeping nymph, in reality Wilhelmina Norman (who Bellman courted in the summer of 1773), to awaken and come fishing. The waterways, too, are Swedish, with familiar fish like pike.

Verse translations of the second stanza of song 31
Carl Michael Bellman, 1791

Kom nu och fiska, noten är bunden,
Kom nu på stunden,
Följ mig åt;
Kläd på dig tröjan,
Kjorteln och slöjan;
Gäddan och löjan
Ställ försåt.
Vakna Amaryllis lilla, vakna;
Lät mig ej ditt glada sällskap sakna;
Bland Delphiner och Sirener nakna
Sku vi nu plaska med vår lilla båt.

Charles Wharton Stork, 1917

Let's go a-fishing—nets are all spread now—
Mope not in bed now,
Quickly rise!
Come thou, all bodiced,
Kirtled so modest;
Fish of the oddest
Be our prize!
Amaryllis, little one, awaken,—
Lacking thee, of joy I'm quite forsaken;
From our boat the spray will soon be shaken,
As mid the dolphins and sirens it flies.

Hendrik Willem Van Loon, 1939

Let's go a-fishing, nets are now spread, oh,
Leave your cozy bed
and follow me.
Fasten your placket,
Put on your jacket,
Stop now all the racket,
Hear my plea.
Amaryllis, waken little one,
Without you life is robbed of mirth and fun.
Let's follow dolphins and with sirens run,
And in our skiff, splash and dance over the sea.

Paul Britten Austin, 1977

Come, come a-fishing! Ready our rod is;
Fasten thy bodice,
Skirt and coat.
Cease then thy railing
Little availing;
Perch, pike and grayling
Greedy float.
Fairest Amaryllis, do not fly me,
Nor the pleasure of these hours deny me.
Where the dolphin rolls on billow briny
Let us be splashing in our little boat.

== Reception and legacy ==
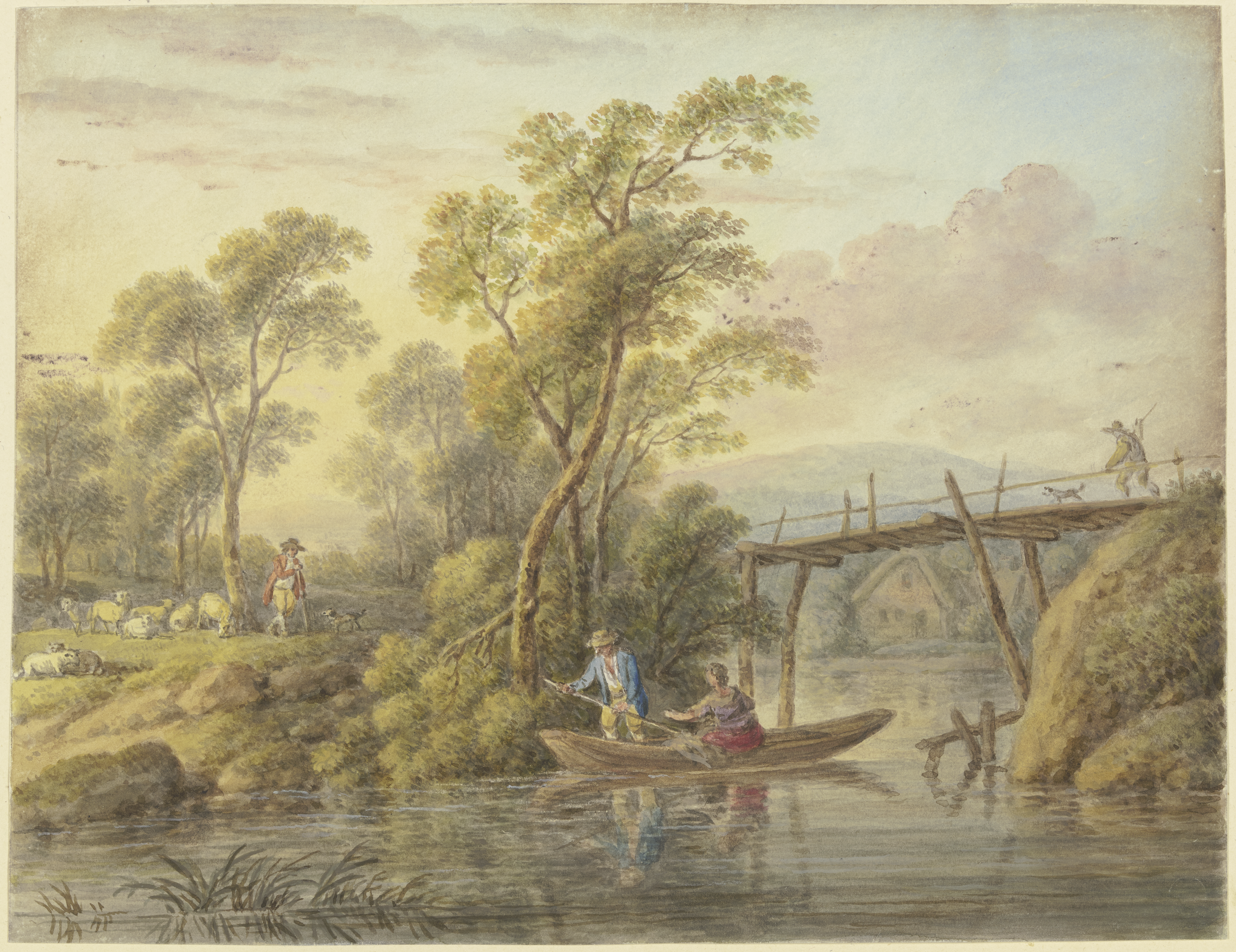
The song invokes a pastoral landscape with a stream, a couple in a rowing-boat, and a shepherd with his sheep. Painting by Karl Schallhas, 1649

The Bellman scholar Lars Lönnroth calls the song a graceful pastorale in rococo style. He notes that people have taken his pastoral songs, of which this is "the best known", as completely conventional works following the classical template of a shepherd-poet in pursuit of his fair nymph. It indeed begins, Lönnroth writes, as an aubade or morning song, like a medieval Provençal troubadour's. The young fisherman wakens his beloved and, in the first stanza, asks her to come fishing with him in an Arcadian landscape peopled with mythic figures, including Morpheus the god of sleep and Neptune, god of the sea. In the next stanza, he bids her dress herself; in the third, to fetch her fishing-tackle, and in the last stanza to climb into his boat. This plays out as a simple sequence of theatrical scenes. But, writes Lönnroth, it can equally well be read as a seduction. The last stanza drops the pretence of going out to catch pike, and states openly that "Love shall rule/In our chests." The seascape, too, he writes, has suddenly changed from calm to stormy; but the shepherd sings that he can find comfort "In thy calm embrace." Lönnroth observes that in Fredman's Epistle No. 25, "Blåsen nu alla", Bellman goes further into full-blown grotesque, sharply contrasting the classical imagery with the drunken orgiastic reality; but in "Opp Amaryllis!", the poet shows his skill in creating drama from a simple shepherd-poem, and undermining the pastoral with discreet hints of storms and death.

Bellman's biographer Paul Britten Austin describes the song as "one of his most delightful, and for many years [it] was far and away the most popular. It goes to a charming air." "Opp Amaryllis!" was recorded in 1924 by Folke Andersson and Edvard Andreasson for His Master's Voice. More recently, the song has been recorded many times; it was among the Bellman songs recorded in 1960 by Roland Bengtsson and Folke Sällström, and in 1988 by the actor Mikael Samuelson. The song was recorded in English by Martin Best in 1995.

== Sources ==
- Bellman, Carl Michael (1790). Fredmans epistlar. Stockholm: By Royal Privilege.
- Britten Austin, Paul (1967). The Life and Songs of Carl Michael Bellman: Genius of the Swedish Rococo. New York: Allhem, Malmö American-Scandinavian Foundation. ISBN 978-3-932759-00-0.
- Britten Austin, Paul (1977). Fredman's Epistles and Songs. Stockholm: Reuter and Reuter. OCLC 5059758.
- Bellman, Carl Michael (1989). Bellman – en antologi [Bellman – an anthology]. illustrated by Dahl, Peter; contributors : Hassler, Göran and Bagge, Ulf. En bok för alla. ISBN 91-7448-742-6.
- Bellman, Carl Michael (1984). Kleveland, Åse (ed.). Fredmans epistlar & sånger [The songs and epistles of Fredman]. Ehrén, Svenolov (illus.). Stockholm: Informationsförlaget. ISBN 91-7736-059-1. (with facsimiles of sheet music from first editions in 1790, 1791)
- Lönnroth, Lars (2005). Ljuva karneval! : om Carl Michael Bellmans diktning [Lovely Carnival! : about Carl Michael Bellman's Verse]. Stockholm: Albert Bonniers Förlag. ISBN 978-91-0-057245-7. OCLC 61881374.
- Stork, Charles Wharton (1917). Anthology of Swedish Lyrics, 1750-1915. New York: The American-Scandinavian Foundation.
- Van Loon, Hendrik Willem; Castagnetta, Grace (1939). The Last of the Troubadours. New York: Simon & Schuster.
