= Så lunka vi så småningom =

Song by Swedish poet and songwriter Carl Michael Bellman

- Art song
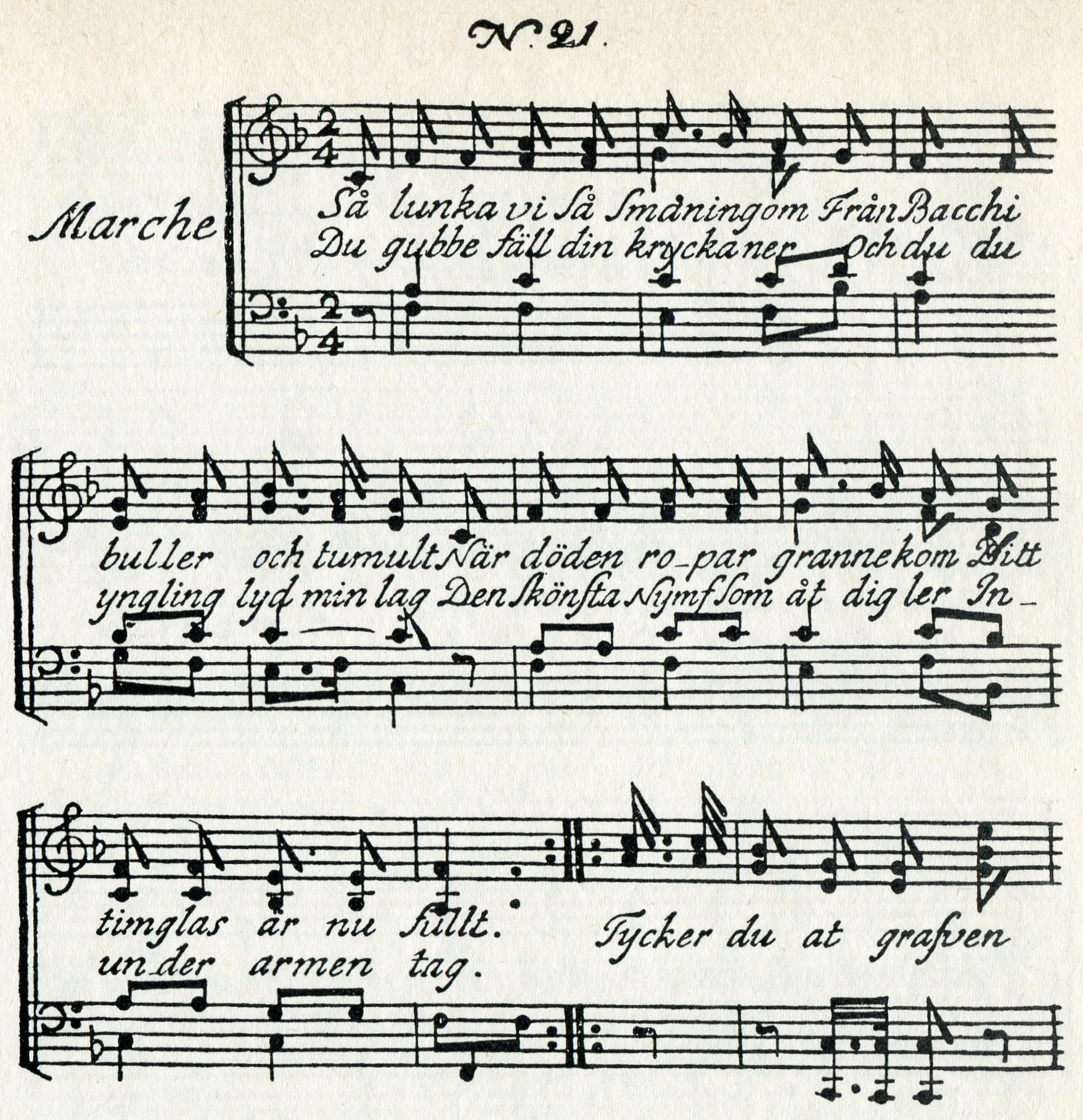
- Marche, 2/4 time
- English: So we gradually amble
- Written: December 1787
- Text: poem by Carl Michael Bellman
- Language: Swedish
- Melody: May be from Naumann's Gustaf Wasa
- Composed: 1786
- Published: 1791 in Fredman's Songs
- Scoring: voice and cittern

Så lunka vi så småningom (So we gradually amble) is a song from the Swedish poet and performer Carl Michael Bellman's 1791 collection, Fredman's Songs, where it is No. 21. The song, written a few months after the death of his son Eli, is addressed to his hosts at a meal. It makes light of death, while presenting it to each person individually, of high or low rank in society. The refrain sings of a pair of gravediggers discussing whether the grave is too deep, taking repeated swigs from a bottle of brandy.

Bellman's biographer Lars Lönnroth writes that Bellman takes an existential look at life in the song, comparing the tone to the monologue in Hamlet where the prince laments, holding Yorick's skull in his hands, though this does not prevent Bellman from describing the usual drinking and gallows humour. The musicologist Richard Engländer calls the song especially interesting for its use of a march from a key moment in Naumann's opera Gustaf Wasa: the King's nocturnal monologue in his tent, where he debates whether to capitulate or to fight. The melody's military associations are reworked into a song of contempt for death.

== Context ==
Carl Michael Bellman is a central figure in the Swedish ballad tradition and a powerful influence in Swedish music, known for his 1790 Fredman's Epistles and his 1791 Fredman's Songs. A solo entertainer, he played the cittern, accompanying himself as he performed his songs at the royal court.

Jean Fredman (1712 or 1713–1767) was a real watchmaker of Bellman's Stockholm. The fictional Fredman, alive after 1767, but without employment, is the supposed narrator in Bellman's epistles and songs. The epistles, written and performed in different styles, from drinking songs and laments to pastorales, paint a complex picture of the life of the city during the 18th century. A frequent theme is the demimonde, with Fredman's cheerfully drunk Order of Bacchus, a loose company of ragged men who favour strong drink and prostitutes. At the same time as depicting this realist side of life, Bellman creates a rococo picture, full of classical allusion, following the French post-Baroque poets. The women, including the beautiful Ulla Winblad, are "nymphs", while Neptune's festive troop of followers and sea-creatures sport in Stockholm's waters. The juxtaposition of elegant and low life is humorous, sometimes burlesque, but always graceful and sympathetic. The songs are "most ingeniously" set to their music, which is nearly always borrowed and skilfully adapted.

== Song ==
=== Melody and verse form ===
Melody of Fredman's Song 21

The song is in 2/4 time and is marked Marche. It has 8 verses, each of 8 lines, with a 4-line chorus repeated after every verse. The rhyming pattern of each verse is the alternating ABAB-CDCD, while the chorus has the pattern EEFF.

The melody is found in Johann Gottlieb Naumann's 1786 opera (with Johan Henric Kellgren's libretto) Gustaf Wasa, but it is not certain whether Bellman took it from there directly or via another source.

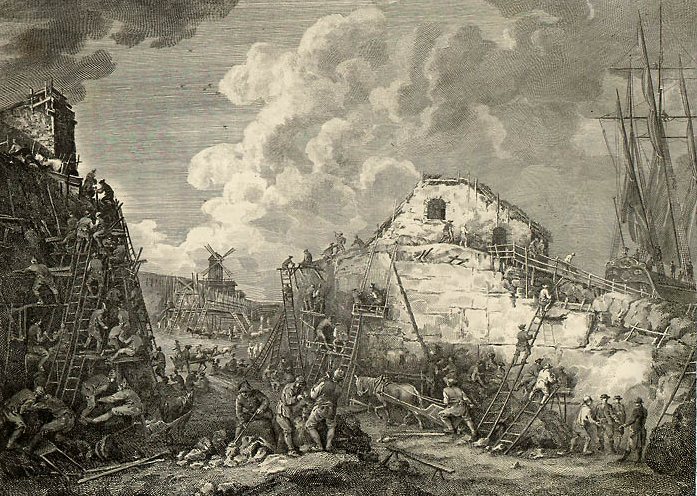
Life is hard and then you die, so why not have a drink? Engraving of Sveaborg's Galley Docks by Bellman's contemporary, Elias Martin, 1782

=== Lyrics ===
The song was subtitled "Måltids sång" in the first edition; Kleveland and Ehrén give a more explanatory subtitle Under måltiden, varvid han ställer döden under gästernas ögon (During a meal, during which he places death under the eyes of the guests). It is a table-song, which in the last stanza implores the guests around the table to praise host and hostess, in reality Gustaf and Helena Widman. Bellman wrote it between Christmas and New Year in December 1787, some months after the death of his son Eli. The song makes light of death, urging youths to "heed my word, and take the prettiest Nymph who smiles at you under your arm". The chorus runs "Do you think the grave is too deep? Well, take a swig, take another, ditto two, ditto three, so you'll die happier."

Versions of the second stanza of song 21
Carl Michael Bellman, 1791

Du vid din remmare och präss,
Rödbrusig och med hatt på sned,
Snart skrider fram din likprocess
I några svarta led;
Och du som pratar där så stort,
Med band och stjernor på din rock,
Ren snickarn kistan färdig gjort,
Och hyflar på des lock.

Tycker du at grafven är för djup,
Nå välan så tag dig då en sup,
Tag dig sen dito en, dito två, dito tre,
Så dör du nöjdare.

Paul Britten Austin, 1977

And thou who standest to thy glass,
All flush'd of face, with hat askew,
Tomorrow shall thy fun'ral pass,
With mourners black a few.
And thou, beribbon'd noble sir,
Who speakest grand words splendidly,
A coffin lid the carpenter
Is planing down for thee.

Is the grave too deep? Then take a sip,
Raise the brimming goblet to thy lip!
Yet a sip! Ditto one, ditto two, ditto three ...
Then die contentedly.

John Irons, 2014

You at your dram and rummer glass,
with cheeks all flushed and hat awry,
ere long your hearse will slowly pass
and swathed in black go by!
And you who big words ne’er did shun,
your coat by stars and orders hid,
the joiner’s got your coffin done,
is planing smooth its lid!

Is the grave too deep, both fore and aft?
Time to take yourself another draught,
once with one you’ve begun, make it two, make it three,
and die contentedly!

== Reception ==
Bellman's biographer Lars Lönnroth writes that Bellman takes an existential look at life in the song, comparing the tone to the monologue in Hamlet Act 5, scene 1 where the prince laments, holding Yorick's skull in his hands. All the same, he writes, Bellman still turns in the end "to his usual role as the drinking-companion full of gallows humour". The song has been recorded by the Bellman interpreters Fred Åkerström and Sven-Bertil Taube.

The musicologist Richard Engländer calls the song "a specially interesting case". In common with Fredman's Song no. 9, "Måltidssång" ("Mealtime Song") is its setting, at table, and its use of a marching melody from Naumann's Gustaf Wasa. He notes that the melody of song 21 is from a key moment in the opera: Act II, scene 6, Gustaf Wasa's nocturnal monologue in his tent, where he debates whether to capitulate, since the Danes have his mother as a hostage, and sacrifice his mother, or to continue to fight? Bellman, he writes, transforms the robust military associations of the melody into a "a cynical song of contempt for death in soldierly tone". Anyone, Engländer states, who had seen the opera, and who knew Bellman's song with its rhythmic variation in the refrain, would feel the song's clear and grim association with the scene.

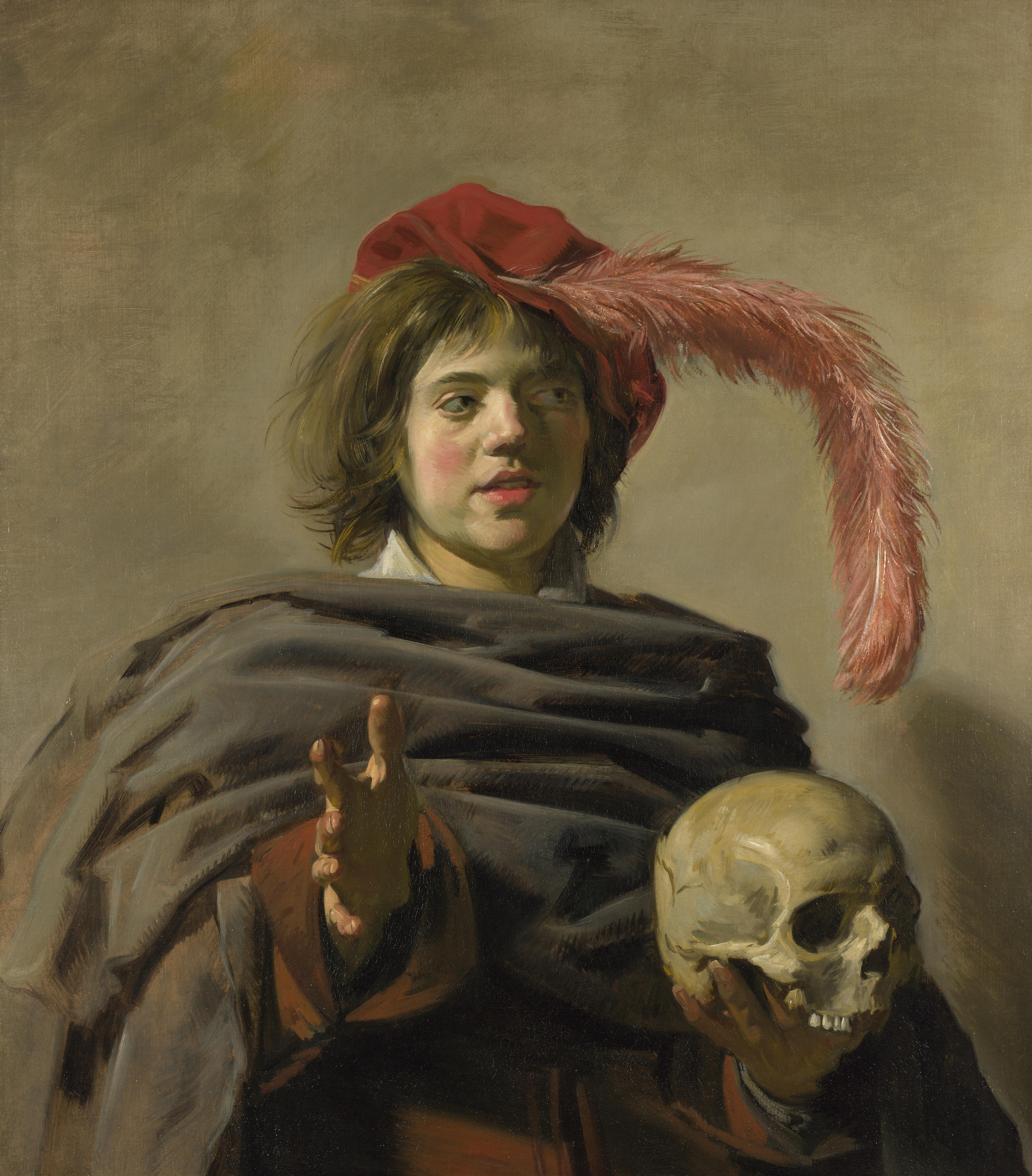
The song's theme has been compared to the scene in Hamlet with Yorick's skull. Painting Young Man with a Skull by Frans Hals, c. 1626

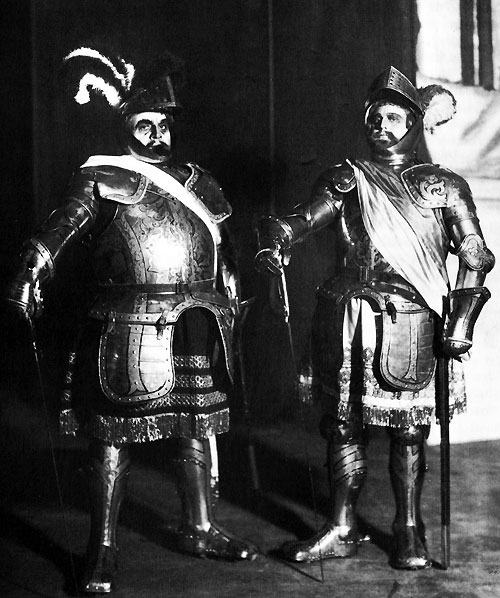
The melody is from Johann Gottlieb Naumann's 1786 opera Gustaf Wasa, at the critical moment where Gustaf Wasa (right) agonises over whether to continue to fight the Danes.

== Sources ==
- Bellman, Carl Michael (1790). Fredmans epistlar. Stockholm: By Royal Privilege.
- Bellman, Carl Michael (1989). Bellman – en antologi [Bellman – an anthology]. illustrated by Dahl, Peter; contributors : Hassler, Göran and Bagge, Ulf. En bok för alla. ISBN 91-7448-742-6.
- Bellman, Carl Michael (1984). Kleveland, Åse (ed.). Fredmans epistlar & sånger [The songs and epistles of Fredman]. Ehrén, Svenolov (illustrator). Stockholm: Informationsförlaget. ISBN 91-7736-059-1. (with facsimiles of sheet music from first editions in 1790, 1791)
- Britten Austin, Paul (1967). The Life and Songs of Carl Michael Bellman: Genius of the Swedish Rococo. New York: Allhem, Malmö American-Scandinavian Foundation. ISBN 978-3-932759-00-0.
- Britten Austin, Paul (1977). Fredman's Epistles and Songs. Stockholm: Reuter and Reuter. OCLC 5059758.
- Burman, Carina (2019). Bellman. Biografin [Bellman. The Biography]. Stockholm: Albert Bonniers Förlag. ISBN 978-9100141790.
- Hassler, Göran; Dahl, Peter (illus.) (1989). Bellman – en antologi [Bellman – an anthology]. En bok för alla. ISBN 91-7448-742-6. (contains the most popular Epistles and Songs, in Swedish, with sheet music)
- Kleveland, Åse; Ehrén, Svenolov (1984). Fredmans epistlar & sånger [The songs and epistles of Fredman] (in Swedish). Stockholm: Informationsförlaget. ISBN 91-7736-059-1. (with facsimiles of sheet music from first editions in 1790, 1791)
- Lönnroth, Lars (2005). Ljuva karneval! : om Carl Michael Bellmans diktning [Lovely Carnival! : about Carl Michael Bellman's Verse]. Stockholm: Albert Bonniers Förlag. ISBN 978-91-0-057245-7. OCLC 61881374.
