= Stolta Stad! =

Song and speech by the 18th century Swedish bard Carl Michael Bellman

"Stolta stad"
- Art song
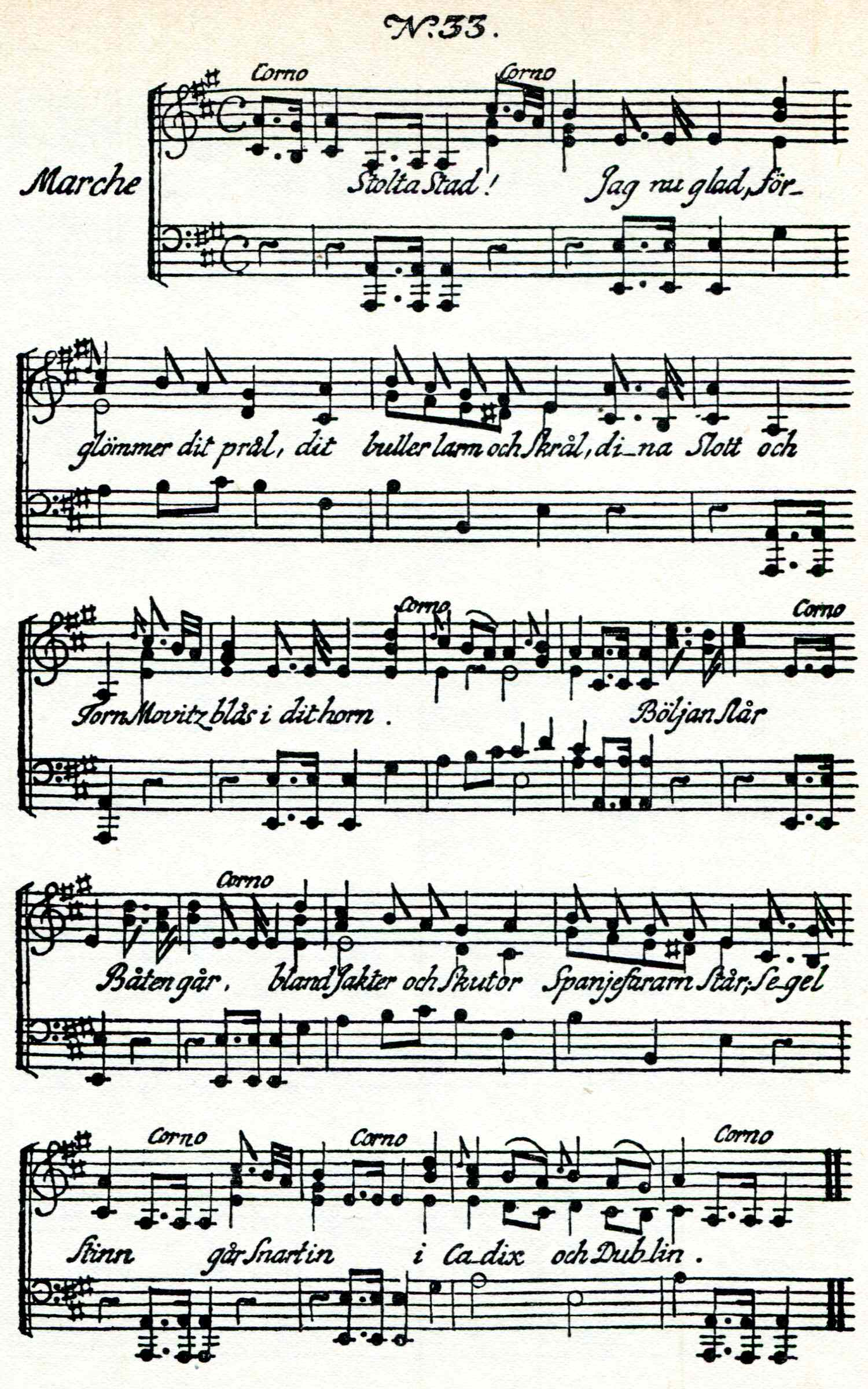
- First page of sheet music for the 1790 edition; there are also spoken sections.
- English: Proud city!
- Written: 16 October 1771
- Text: poem by Carl Michael Bellman
- Language: Swedish
- Melody: Allegedly from Pierre-Alexandre Monsigny's opera Le cadi dupé
- Composed: 1761 (if Monsigny is the source)
- Published: 1790 in Fredman's Epistles
- Scoring: voice and cittern

Stolta stad! (Proud city!) is Epistle No. 33 in the Swedish poet and performer Carl Michael Bellman's 1790 song collection, Fredman's Epistles. One of his best-known works, it combines both spoken (with words in German, Danish, Swedish, and French) and sung sections (in Swedish). In the spoken sections, Bellman, as composer and as performer, imitates a whole crowd of people of many descriptions. It has been described as Swedish literature's most congenial portrait of the country's capital city, Stockholm.

The epistle is subtitled "1:o Om Fader Movitz's öfverfart til Djurgården, och 2:o om den dygdiga Susanna." (Firstly about father Movitz's crossing to Djurgården, and secondly about the virtuous Susanna). Performances of the epistle have been recorded by Fred Åkerström and by Sven-Bertil Taube.

== Background ==
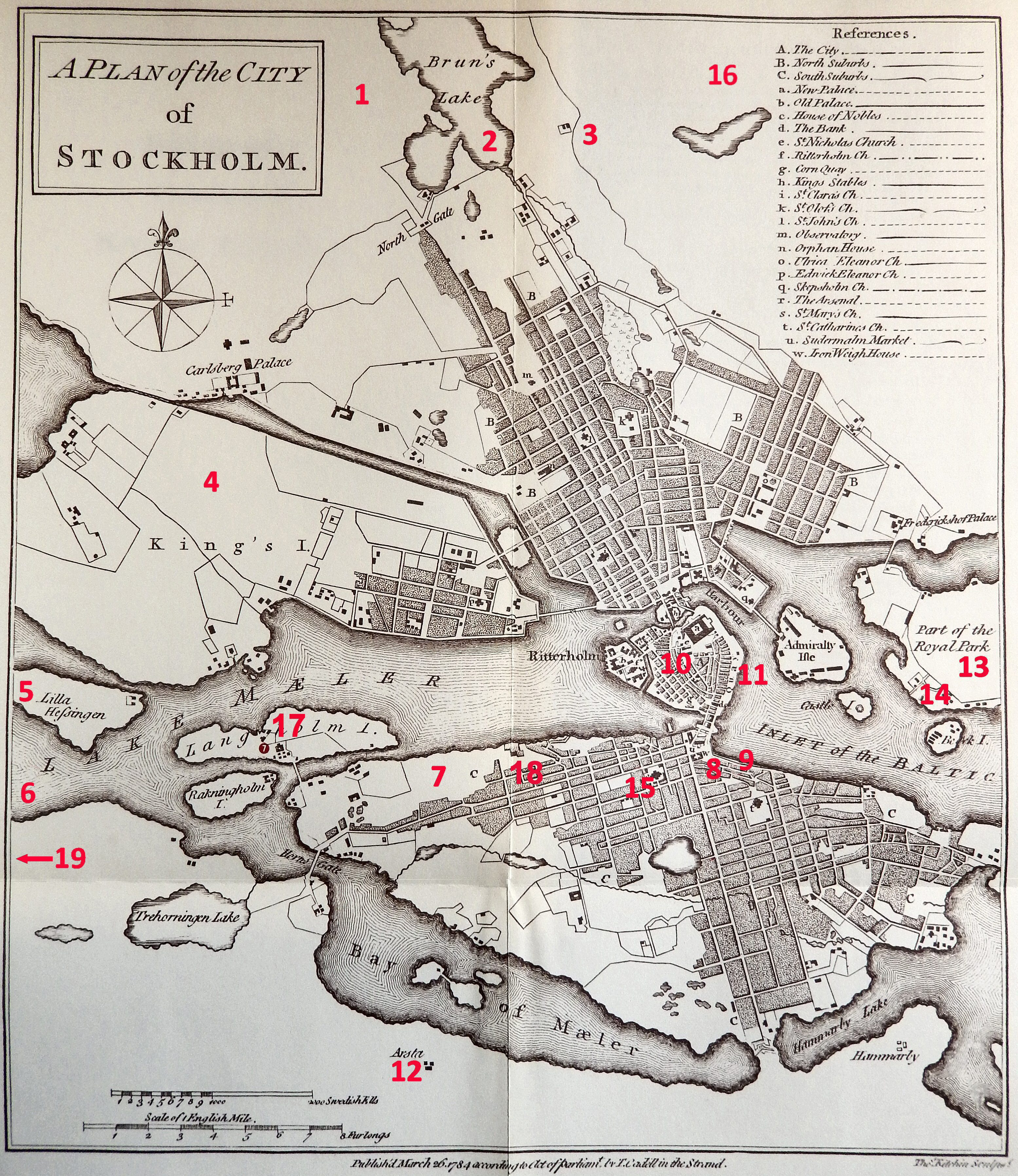
Map of Bellman's Stockholm, places of interest for his Fredman's Epistles and Songs on map from William Coxe's Travels into Poland, Russia, Sweden, and Denmark, 1784. 1 Haga park (S. 64) – 2 Brunnsviken – 3 Första Torpet (Ep. 80) – 4 Kungsholmen – 5 Hessingen (Ep. 48) – 6 Lake Mälaren (Ep. 48) – 7 Södermalm – 8 Urvädersgränd – 9 Lokatten tavern (Ep. 11, Ep. 59, Ep. 77), Bruna Dörren tavern (Ep. 24, Ep. 38) – 10 Gamla stan (Ep. 5, Ep. 9, Ep. 23, Ep. 28, Ep. 79) – 11 Skeppsbron Quay (Ep. 33) – 12 Årsta Castle – 13 Djurgården Park – (Ep. 25, Ep. 51, Ep. 82) – 14 Gröna Lund (Ep. 12, Ep. 62) – 15 Bellman's birthplace – 16 Fiskartorpet (Ep. 71) – 17 Lilla Sjötullen (Bellmanmuseet) (Ep. 48) – 18 Bensvarvars tavern (Ep. 40) 19 Rostock tavern (Ep. 45)

Carl Michael Bellman is a central figure in the Swedish ballad tradition and a powerful influence in Swedish music, known for his 1790 Fredman's Epistles and his 1791 Fredman's Songs. A solo entertainer, he played the cittern, accompanying himself as he performed his songs at the royal court.

Jean Fredman (1712 or 1713–1767) was a real watchmaker of Bellman's Stockholm. The fictional Fredman, alive after 1767, but without employment, is the supposed narrator in Bellman's epistles and songs. The epistles, written and performed in different styles, from drinking songs and laments to pastorales, paint a complex picture of the life of the city during the 18th century. A frequent theme is the demimonde, with Fredman's cheerfully drunk Order of Bacchus, a loose company of ragged men who favour strong drink and prostitutes. At the same time as depicting this realist side of life, Bellman creates a rococo picture, full of classical allusion, following the French post-Baroque poets. The women, including the beautiful Ulla Winblad, are "nymphs", while Neptune's festive troop of followers and sea-creatures sport in Stockholm's waters. The juxtaposition of elegant and low life is humorous, sometimes burlesque, but always graceful and sympathetic. The songs are "most ingeniously" set to their music, which is nearly always borrowed and skilfully adapted.

== Epistle ==
The epistle is dated 16 October 1771.

=== Spoken sections ===
The Epistle begins with a long spoken section, starting with "Was ist das?" (German for "What's that?"), imitative of a motley crowd waiting on the Stockholm quayside at Skeppsbron in the old town, Gamla stan, with people relaxing while others try to move about. They are speaking in Swedish, German, French, and a few words of Danish. In the crush are milk sellers, sailors, pastry sellers, prostitutes, an acrobat dressed as a harlequin, a man with some dancing bears, a German with a monkey on his shoulder, and a customs officer, who cheerfully calls himself a "customs snake". A soldier is squatting to defecate, people are playing a game of cards with trumps, and someone is trying to play the French horn. Two shorter spoken sections are interspersed with the sung sections.

A small part of the introductory spoken section, in a mixture of Swedish, French (italics), and imitated-phonetic German (boldface)
Stolta Stad!	Prose Translation
Trumf i Klöver. - Där kommer Movitz. - Åtta och åtta gör mej Sexton, Fyra til så har jag Sjutton. - Mera Klöfver. - Sex och Sex är Tolf. - Åt du opp Hjerter Fru? - Ja du har vunnit. - Kors så du ser ut Movitz! - Nog känner jag igen Peruken; han har lånt Skoflickarens Peruk som bor midt emot Wismar i Kolmätar-gränd. - Lustigt! Basfiolen på ryggen, Tulpan på hatten, Valdhornet under armen, och Buteljen i fickan. - Stig i båten. - Hvad säjer den där gullsmidda Äppeltysken med Markattan på axeln? - Le diable! il porte son Violon, oui, par dessus l'épaule comme le Suisse porte la hallebarde. - Nu tar han til Valthornet. - Prutt, prutt, prutt, prutt. - Ach tu tummer taifel! Er ferschteht sich auf der musik wie ein Kuh auf den mittag. Movitz, bruder, willstu was Kirschen haben? - Stig i båten Susanna. Akta Köttkorgen.	Trumps in Clubs. - There comes Movitz. - Eight and eight makes sixteen, Four more so I have seventeen. - More Clubs. - Six and six is twelve. - Have you taken the Hearts, woman? - Yes, you've won. - By the Holy Cross, what a mess you look, Movitz! - Probably I recognize the wig; he's borrowed the wig of that shoe girl who lives opposite the Wismar pub in Kolmätar Alley. - Funny! With his double bass on his back, tulip in his hat, French horn under his arm, and his [brandy-]bottle in his pocket. - Get in the boat. - What does that apple-German with the gold thread in his shirt and the monkey on his shoulder say? - Le diable! il porte son Violon, oui, par dessus l'épaule comme le Suisse porte la hallebarde. (Note: In French: The devil! He's carrying his violin, yes, over his shoulder as a Swiss Guard carries his halberd.) - Now he's going to play his French horn. - Prrp, prrp, prrp, prrp. - **Ach tu tummer taifel! Er ferschteht sich auf der musik wie ein Kuh auf den mittag. Movitz, bruder, willstu was Kirschen haben?** (Note: The original is in mock-phonetic German: Oh you schtupid deffil! He underschtands music like a cow at dinner. Movitz, brother, d'you vant some cherries?) - Get in the boat Susanna. Mind the meat basket.

=== Music and verse form ===
Melody of Epistle 33
Melody of the sung part of Stolta Stad!

The song has four verses, with two further spoken sections. Each verse has twelve lines, with the rhyming pattern AABBCCDDDEEE; of these, the lines AA both begin with Corno, horn, and all the lines CDD and EEE end with Corno; the first verse mentions Movitz, a musician, and one of the stock characters in Fredman's Epistles. The song is in 4/4 time in the key of A major, and is marked Marche. The Epistle is dated 16 October 1771. Three of the spoken sections end with a mention that a "nymph", Susanna, is to sing; only this and No. 67 (Fader Movitz, bror) among the epistles call for a woman's voice, but the identify of "Susanna" is not known. The melody was said by Nils Afzelius to come from the aria "Regardez ces traits" in Pierre-Alexandre Monsigny's opera Le cadi dupé, but this is disputed by the musicologist James Massengale.

=== Lyrics ===
Like the spoken sections, the lyrics portray the life of Stockholm, with mentions of buildings, ships, flags, and the noisy mixed crowd on a boat, crossing the harbour from Skeppsbron quay to Djurgården. There is drinking and song, and the beautiful Ulla Winblad is closely observed. The last stanza hints at sex in the boat.

The first verse, sung and with horn (Corno) accompaniment
Carl Michael Bellman, 1790

Corno. - - - Stolta Stad!
Corno - - - Jag nu glad
Förglömmer ditt prål,
Ditt buller, larm och skrål,
Dina Slott och Torn.
Movitz blås i ditt horn - - - Corno
Böljan slår, - - - Corno
Båten går, - - - Corno
Bland Jakter och Skutor Spanjefararn står
Segelstinn - - - Corno
Går snart in - - - Corno
I Cadix och Dublin. - - - Corno

Prose Translation

Proud City!
I'm happy now
Forgetting your ostentation,
Your noise, alarm and clatter,
Your Castles and Towers.
Movitz blow your horn - - -
The waves slap, - - -
The boat goes, - - -
Among yachts and skiffs the Spaniard stands
The sail's tip - - -
Is going in soon - - -
In Cádiz and Dublin.

Hendrik Willem van Loon, 1939

Proud town!
How I frown
Up on your haughty poise,
Despise your din and noise!
Palace too, I scorn,
So Movitz blow, blow your horn.
Wish I were,
Wanderer,
See there 'mong the boats a Spanish visitor.
Sails all taut,
This Argonaut
Is on its way to some far distant port.

== Reception and legacy ==
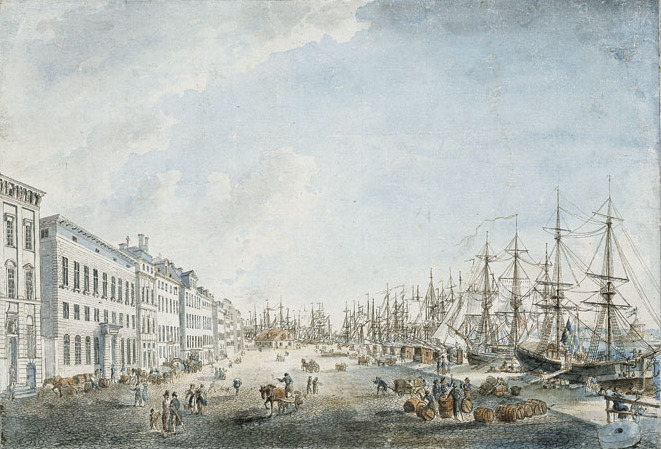
Proud city: Skeppsbron, where the characters of the Epistle wait to cross to Djurgården, to the east of Stockholm. Engraving by Johan Petter Cumelin

Carina Burman notes in her biography of Bellman that Bellman knew the Skeppsbron area of Stockholm intimately, as it lay just outside his office in the General Directorate of Customs. She likens his description of the harbourside to that in Fredman's Songs no. 65, "So I look out at the shore", which includes the lyrics

Uppå ett skrov, kullvältrat och stjälpt, som bugnar av buller och slammer,
skuffad och trängd av gubbar och barn, gesäller, mamseller, madammer,
står jag på tå med kikarn i hand och suckar vid blixt av kanoner.

Upon an upside-down, overturned hull, that echoes with yammer and clatter,
shoved and crowded by grandads and youths, companions, mamselles, and ladies,
I stand on my toes with spyglass in hand and sigh at the flash of the cannons.

The scholar of Swedish literature Lars Lönnroth writes that the long prose section of the "famous" epistle 33 is the culmination of Bellman's skill with one particular dramatic technique, the ability to depict a whole crowd at once, among them his invented cast, Fredman's drinking-companions. That, he notes, immediately poses a question, namely, which voice is Fredman's amidst the tumult on Skeppsbro. Evidently Fredman is no longer, as in some of the epistles, a preacher or apostle of the gospel of brandy-drinking, but merely one of many actors in the scene, "drowned in a sea of voices". Only when he starts singing, Lönnroth writes, does the voice become unambiguously Fredman's, singing Stockholm's praises. This extreme development of narrative technique, he notes, departs completely from the original epistle format. Citing the Epistle, Anita Ankarcrona observes that Bellman was "the first, and perhaps the greatest, of all Stockholm depicters".

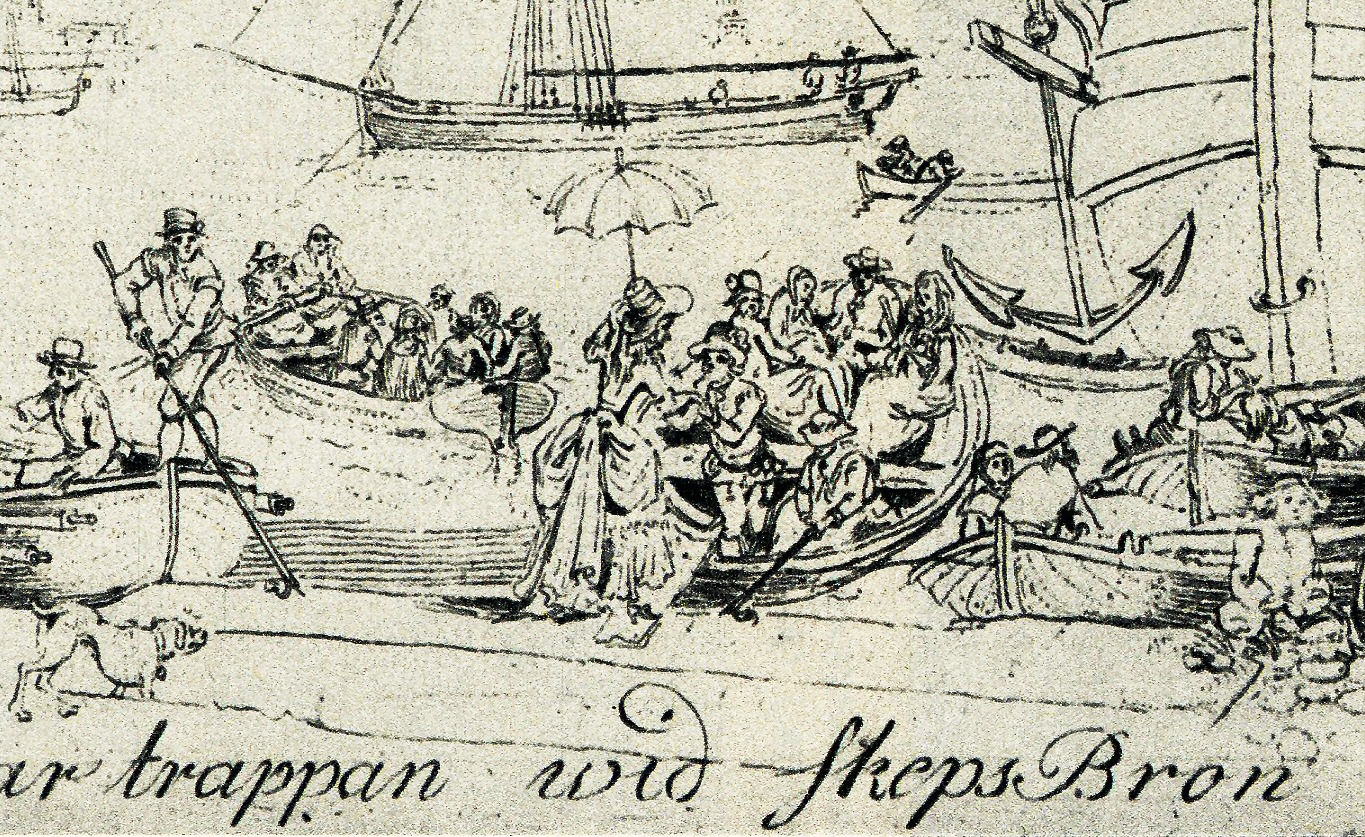
Detail from etching "The steps on Skeppsbron" depicting people embarking in small boats in Stockholm's harbour by Elias Martin, 1800. Ulla Winblad is popularly supposed to be the figure at the centre of the lively company.

The Bellman Society observes that Sweden's capital has never been portrayed with mightier trumpet blasts or more skilfully than in this Epistle, "Swedish literature's most congenial portrait of Stockholm." In its view, the work is neither poem nor song, but a song-drama of a kind created by Bellman himself out of a susurrus of voices around Skeppsbron. Soundscape, it suggests, turns into "a landscape painting, a stunningly beautiful snapshot of a Stockholm crowd in the 1770s". Writing in the Haga-Brunnsviken Nytt, Gunnel Bergström notes that in verse 3, Ulla Winblad climbs on board, and Movitz becomes randy.

Göran Hassler states in his annotated selection of Bellman's work that the Epistle has been recorded in interestingly different interpretations by Fred Åkerström on his 1977 studio album Vila vid denna källa, and by Sven-Bertil Taube on his 1959 album Carl Michael Bellman. It has been performed in costume by Thord Lindé. A tour company that shows people around Bellman's Stockholm has chosen the name "Stolta Stad".

== Sources ==
- Bellman, Carl Michael (1790). Fredmans epistlar. Stockholm: By Royal Privilege.
- Britten Austin, Paul (1967). The Life and Songs of Carl Michael Bellman: Genius of the Swedish Rococo. New York: Allhem, Malmö American-Scandinavian Foundation. ISBN 978-3-932759-00-0.
- Burman, Carina (2019). Bellman. Biografin [Bellman: The Biography] (in Swedish). Stockholm: Bonniers. ISBN 978-9100141790.
- Hassler, Göran; Dahl, Peter (illus.) (1989). Bellman – en antologi [Bellman – an anthology]. En bok för alla. ISBN 91-7448-742-6. (contains the most popular Epistles and Songs, in Swedish, with sheet music)
- Kleveland, Åse; Ehrén, Svenolov (illus.) (1984). Fredmans epistlar & sånger [The songs and epistles of Fredman]. Stockholm: Informationsförlaget. ISBN 91-7736-059-1. (with facsimiles of sheet music from first editions in 1790, 1791)
- Lönnroth, Lars (2005). Ljuva karneval! : om Carl Michael Bellmans diktning [Lovely Carnival! : about Carl Michael Bellman's Verse]. Stockholm: Bonniers. ISBN 978-91-0-057245-7. OCLC 61881374.
- Massengale, James Rhea (1979). The Musical-Poetic Method of Carl Michael Bellman. Stockholm: Almqvist & Wiksell International. ISBN 91-554-0849-4.
- Van Loon, Hendrik Willem; Castagnetta, Grace (1939). The Last of the Troubadours. New York: Simon & Schuster.
