= Hör klockorna med ängsligt dån =

Song by the 18th century Swedish bard Carl Michael Bellman

- Art song
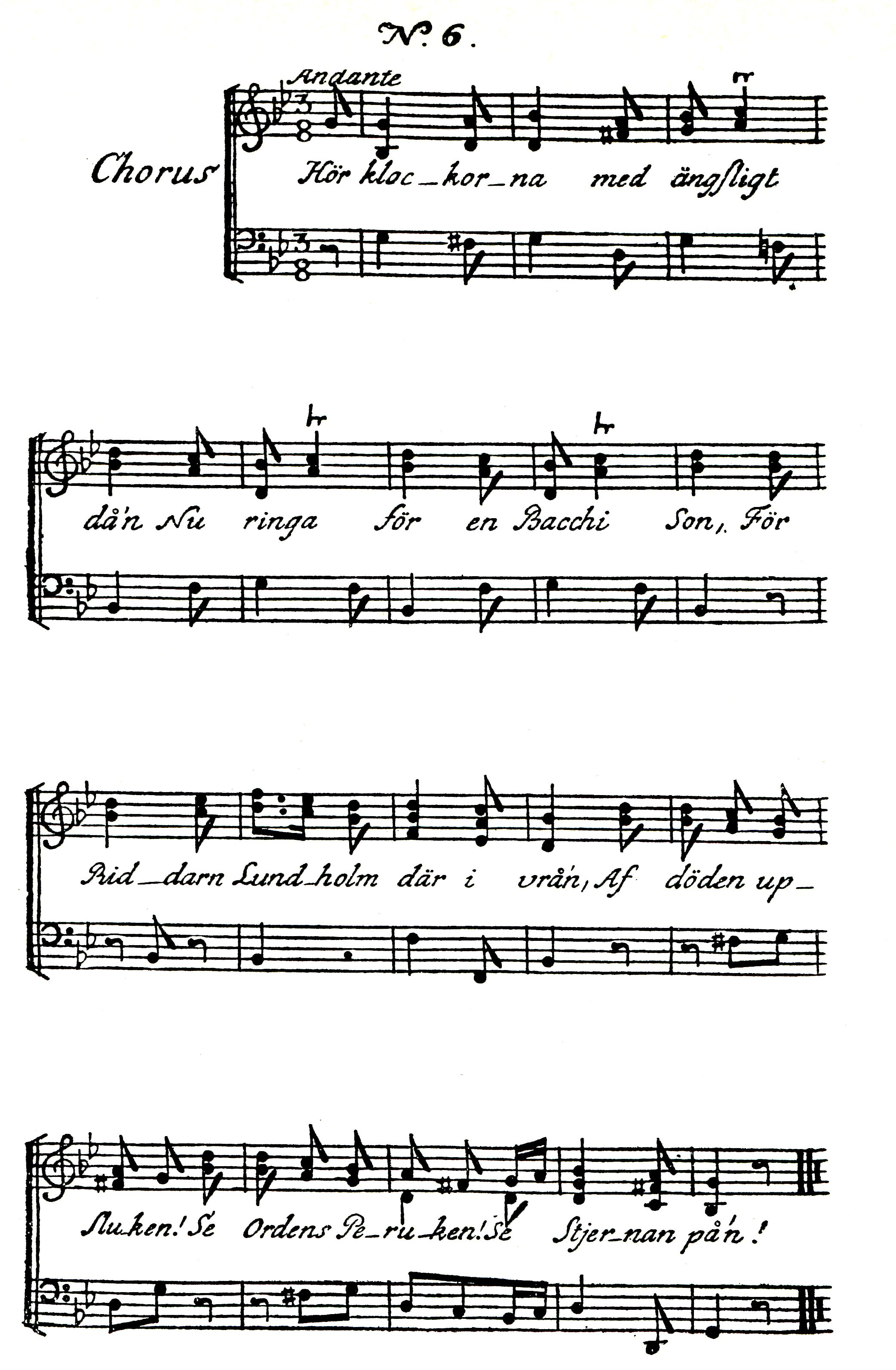
- Sheet music, 1791 edition
- English: Hear the bells with anxious thunder
- Written: 1769
- Text: poem by Carl Michael Bellman
- Language: Swedish
- Melody: Adapted from an ariette in Annette and Lubin
- Dedication: Över brännvinsbrännaren Lundholm (About brandy-distiller Lundholm)
- Published: 1791 in Fredman's Songs
- Scoring: voice and cittern

Hör klockorna med ängsligt dån (Hear the bells with anxious thunder) or Fredman's Song no. 6 is one of the Swedish 18th century poet and performer Carl Michael Bellman's Fredman's Songs, written in 1769. It is subtitled Över brännvinsbrännaren Lundholm (About brandy-distiller Lundholm). It was originally one of the texts for Bellman's Order of Bacchus. It was first performed on 15 October 1769, and quickly became popular, spreading as a transcript. It is structured as a funeral oration for a member of Lundholm's Order, parodying the Swedish system of noble Orders.

== Context ==
Carl Michael Bellman is a central figure in the Swedish ballad tradition and a powerful influence in Swedish music, known for his 1790 Fredman's Epistles and his 1791 Fredman's Songs. A solo entertainer, he played the cittern, accompanying himself as he performed his songs at the royal court.

Jean Fredman (1712 or 1713–1767) was a real watchmaker of Bellman's Stockholm. The fictional Fredman, alive after 1767, but without employment, is the supposed narrator in Bellman's epistles and songs. The epistles, written and performed in different styles, from drinking songs and laments to pastorales, paint a complex picture of the life of the city during the 18th century. A frequent theme is the demimonde, with Fredman's cheerfully drunk Order of Bacchus, a loose company of ragged men who favour strong drink and prostitutes. At the same time as depicting this realist side of life, Bellman creates a rococo picture, full of classical allusion, following the French post-Baroque poets. The women, including the beautiful Ulla Winblad, are "nymphs", while Neptune's festive troop of followers and sea-creatures sport in Stockholm's waters. The juxtaposition of elegant and low life is humorous, sometimes burlesque, but always graceful and sympathetic. The songs are "most ingeniously" set to their music, which is nearly always borrowed and skilfully adapted.

== Song ==
=== Music and verse form ===
Melody of Song 6
Adapted from an Ariette in Annette and Lubin

The song was written on 15 October 1769. The melody is based on an ariette from Justine Favart and Adolphe Blaise's 1763 French comic operetta Annette and Lubin. There are four stanzas, each of six lines, three long and then three short. The rhyming scheme is ABA-CCA. Its time signature is 3/8.

=== Lyrics ===
Song 6 performed by Sune Bohlin

The song is a lament for brandy-distiller Lundholm, described in rococo terms as a member of the Order of Bacchus. It is subtitled Över brännvinsbrännaren Lundholm (About brandy-distiller Lundholm).

The first stanza of Song 6
Carl Michael Bellman, 1791

Hör klockorna med ängsligt dån
Nu ringa för en Bacchi Son,
För Riddarn Lundholm där i vrån,
Af döden upsluken!
Se Ordens Peruken!
Se Stjernan på'n!

Prose translation

Hear the bells with anxious thunder
Now tolling for a Son of Bacchus,
For Sir Lundholm there in the corner,
Swallowed by death!
See the Order's wig!
See the Star on it!

Paul Britten Austin, 1967

Hear how the bells with anxious groan
A faithful Bacchi son bemoan!
'Tis old Sir Lundholm, overthrown
By death in the corner!
His wig is his mourner,
His star's outblown!

== Reception ==
Bellman's English biographer, Paul Britten Austin, states that the song was first performed at Lissander's, late in 1769, at a meeting of the Order of Bacchus. Bellman founded the Order, according to one of the participants, the poet and aristocrat Johan Gabriel Oxenstierna, "in honour of Bacchus. To it he admits no one who in the sight of all hasn't twice lain in the gutter [drunk]". Lundholm was a knight of the Order, a faithful son of Bacchus, god of wine; he saw most of his days "through a bottle's end". Britten Austin calls the words of the song "memorable", writing that

Wedded to the antique and lugubrious air, the Swedish words, in all their striking simplicity, seem to take on a weird and moving dimension beyond anything either words or music, by themselves, could express. Remote and strange, they echo a primitive realm where Eros and Thanatos alone reign over human fate—one outpost, one might say, of Bellman's ever-shifting mood.

Carina Burman writes in her biography of Bellman that in the second verse, Bellman mixes styles: the first line's dully-tolling bells would fit in an epitaph poem, whereas the second line's "lull lull" is in the mode of a lullaby; and then the love-god Cupid appears, only to find that Lundholm was a bad lover, so drunk that one could become intoxicated just by kissing his chin. The third verse, she comments, adopts the common trope in which a life is represented as a day, going from the morning of childhood via the noon of youth to the evening of old age, and transforming it: Lundholm is said seldom to have seen the morning sun, while an evening blush is seen on his red nose. The last verse parodies the Swedish system of noble Orders more directly, Lundholm's knightly insignia being destroyed after his death. Burman notes that the poem was probably part of the performance that so impressed the poet and diplomat Johan Gabriel Oxenstierna when he wrote a famous diary entry of 4 December 1769 about Bellman's performing arts, and that it has since become one of the most popular of Fredman's Songs.

The Bellman biographer Lars Lönnroth sets the poem in the context of Bellman's Order of Bacchus, describing his Order chapter ceremony for the funeral of knight Lundholm as "a real song-cycle in miniature with choirs and soloists for both male and female voices". In Lönnroth's view, it is perhaps the finest of Bellman's Order of Bacchus pieces, and the first to combine burlesque situation comedy with magnificent music. "Hör klockorna" is one of the choral songs, accompanied by the ringing of bells. Lönnroth writes that its description of Lundholm's corpse parodies Favart's text, which amorously described the youthful beauty of the fifteen year old Annette. In place of the shepherdess's kissable mouth and fresh skin, Bellman portrays the aged brandy-distiller's crumbling state, stinking of alcohol. Lönnroth comments that this was the first time that Bellman had managed, as Oxenstierna had observed, to unite the "ridiculous" with the "sublime", parodying both the comic opera of the song's tune and Sweden's noble Orders.

The song has been recorded by the singer and actor Sven-Bertil Taube on his 1959 album Carl Michael Bellman, reissued as part of his 1987 CD Fredmans Epistlar och Sånger, and by Per Chenon on his 1989 album Bellman.

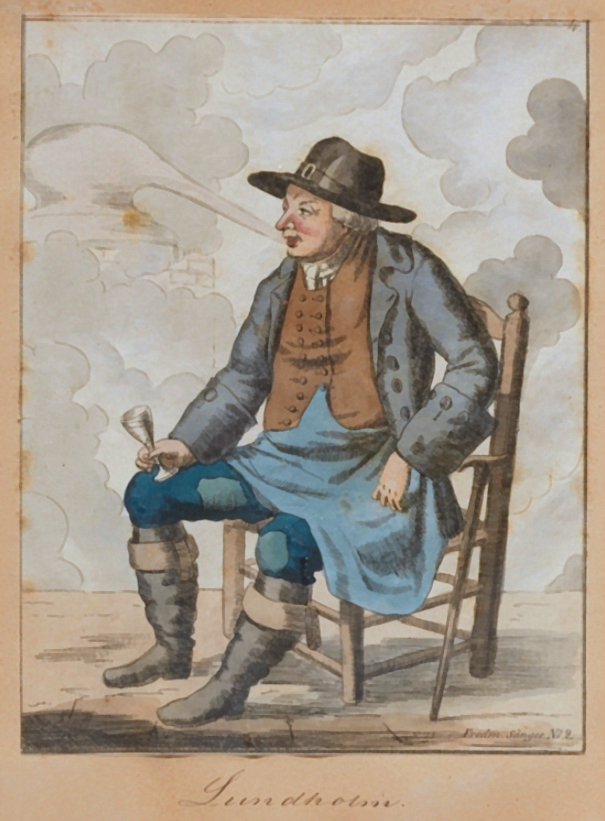
"Brandy Distiller Lundholm" by Elis Chiewitz, c. 1820, for the lines "If ever thy wife kissed thy chin, she'd have been drunk". The neck of a brandy still can be seen near Lundholm's mouth.

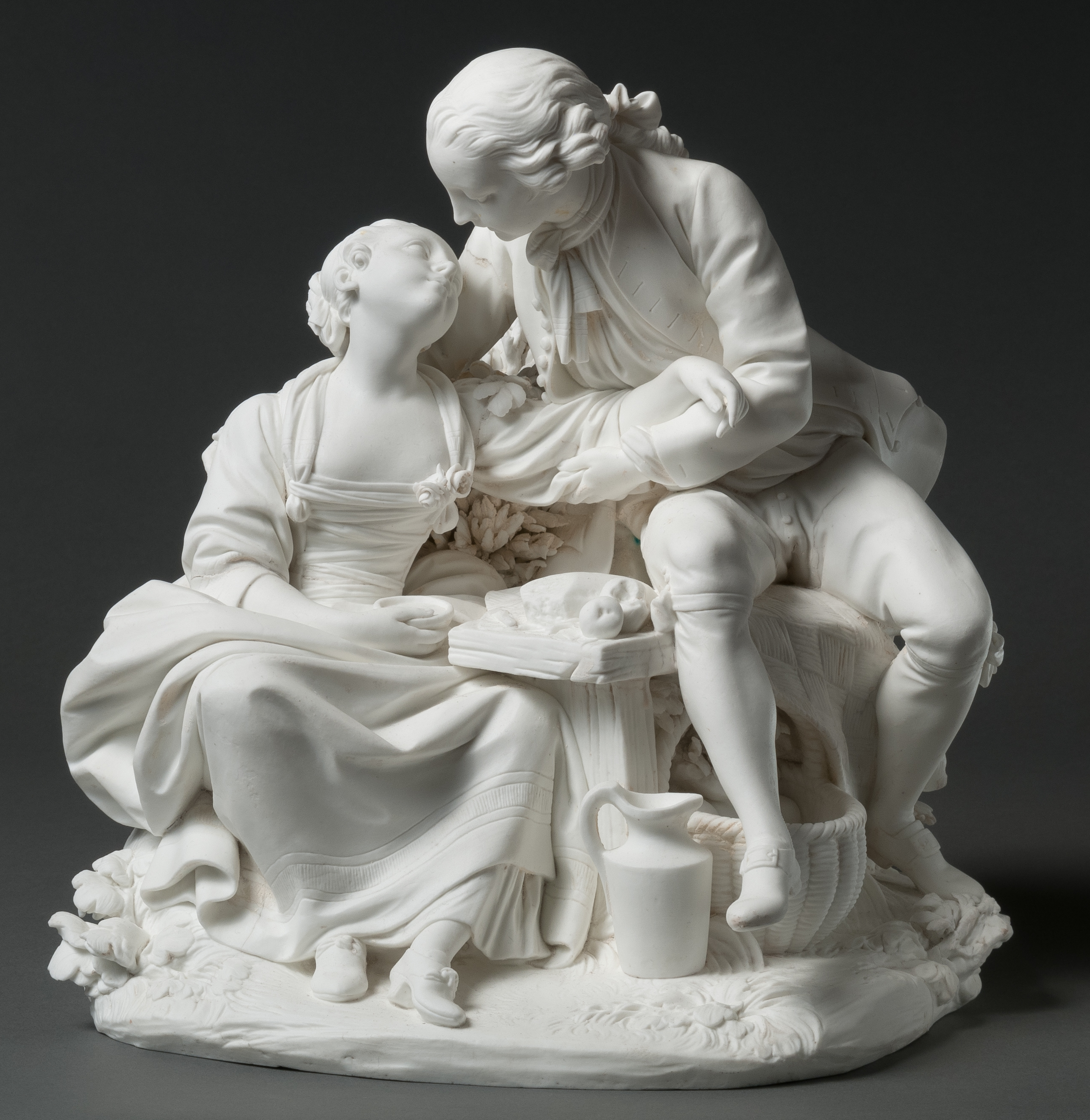
The tune from the romantic operetta Annette et Lubin (Sèvres porcelain figurines shown) contrasts with the funereal lyrics of the song.

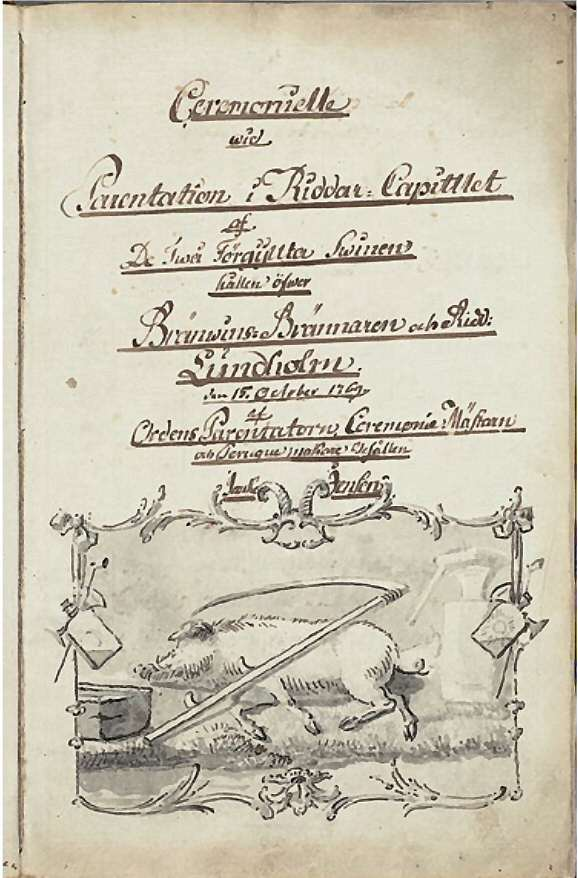
Handwritten title page of Bellman's Order chapter in memory of brandy-distiller Lundholm, with emblem of a pig lying drunk under a scythe, flanked by brandy bottles and tobacco pipes

The epistle mocks noble orders with their stars and finery, as seen here on King Fredrik I's coat with the Order of the Seraphim

== Sources ==
- Bellman, Carl Michael (1790). Fredmans epistlar. Stockholm: By Royal Privilege.
- Bellman, Carl Michael (1791). Fredmans sånger. Stockholm: By Royal Privilege.
- Britten Austin, Paul (1967). The Life and Songs of Carl Michael Bellman: Genius of the Swedish Rococo. New York: Allhem, Malmö American-Scandinavian Foundation. ISBN 978-3-932759-00-0.
- Burman, Carina (2019). Bellman: Biografin [Bellman: The Biography] (in Swedish). Stockholm: Albert Bonniers Förlag. ISBN 978-9100141790.
- Hassler, Göran; Dahl, Peter (illus.) (1989). Bellman – en antologi [Bellman – an anthology]. En bok för alla. ISBN 91-7448-742-6. (contains the most popular Epistles and Songs, in Swedish, with sheet music)
- Kleveland, Åse; Ehrén, Svenolov (illus.) (1984). Fredmans epistlar & sånger [The songs and epistles of Fredman]. Stockholm: Informationsförlaget. ISBN 91-7736-059-1. (with facsimiles of sheet music from first editions in 1790, 1791)
- Lönnroth, Lars (2005). Ljuva karneval! : om Carl Michael Bellmans diktning [Lovely Carnival! : about Carl Michael Bellman's Verse] (in Swedish). Stockholm: Bonniers. ISBN 978-91-0-057245-7. OCLC 61881374.
