= Sven-Bertil Taube =

Swedish singer and actor (1934–2022)

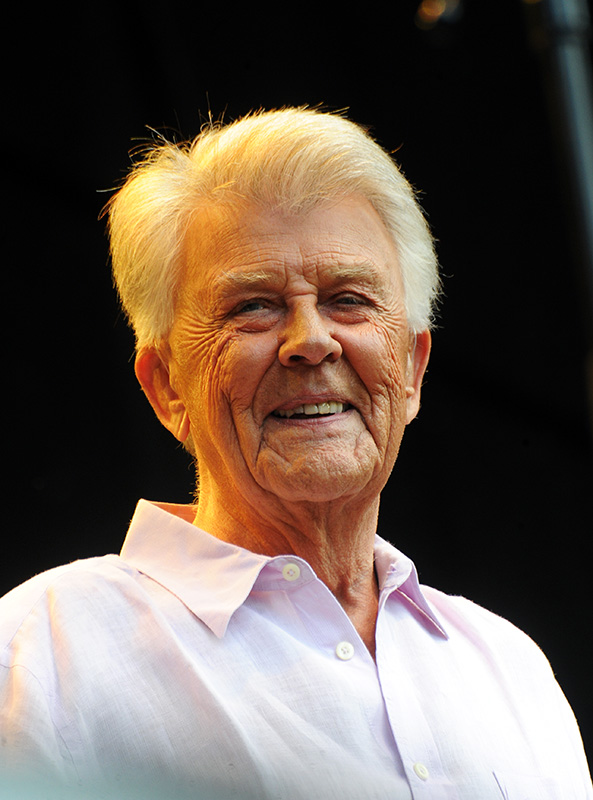
- Taube at the Stockholm Folk Festival in 2014

Background information
- Born: Sven-Bertil Gunnar Evert Taube; 24 November 1934; Stockholm, Sweden
- Died: 11 November 2022 (aged 87) London, England
- Genre: Folk music
- Occupations: Singer, actor
- Instruments: Singing, guitar
- Years active: 1954–2022
- Labels: Folkways, EMI

Sven-Bertil Gunnar Evert Taube (24 November 1934 – 11 November 2022) was a Swedish singer and actor. Internationally, he was perhaps better known for his acting career. Taube played Henrik Vanger in the film The Girl with the Dragon Tattoo, and the lead role in Puppet on a Chain.

== Biography ==
Born in Stockholm on 24 November 1934, he was the son of songwriter Evert Taube and sculptor Astri Taube. At age 14, Taube began playing guitar. While traveling throughout Europe, he developed an interest in folklore and folk music. He performed in concerts on Swedish radio while a student at the Royal Beskow School in Stockholm.

Taube graduated in 1954 from the Cherry Lawn School in Darien, Connecticut. While he was a student at the school, Folkways Records invited him to record an album of Swedish folk songs.

From 1959 to 1962, he studied acting at the Royal Dramatic Training Academy in Stockholm. In 1969, Taube moved to London where he was active in British theatre.

Taube was married four times, and had four children. For many years he resided in Fulham. He belonged to an untitled branch of the Baltic German noble Taube family, introduced at the Swedish House of Nobility in 1668 as noble family No. 734. He died in London on 11 November 2022, aged 87.

== Musical career ==
Taube released his first album in 1954; it included a cover of one of his father's songs. He has since released many albums which include songs written by his father. Several of his most well-known versions of Evert Taube songs come from albums recorded in the 1970s, but he recorded more of them at later stages, including his 2007 album Alderville Road. Referring to that album, reviewer Peter Dahlgren said, "Evert had the yarns and Sven-Bertil had the voice."

He recorded songs from both Fredman's Epistles and Fredman's Songs by the popular Swedish 18th-century songwriter Carl Michael Bellman. Paul Britten Austin wrote in his 1967 biography of Bellman that Sven-Bertil Taube's two Bellman albums (released in 1960 and 1963) "have sold more copies than any other disc, popular or classical, ever released in Sweden". Göran Forsling wrote that Taube helped to start "a new era in Bellman interpretation around 1960", like Fred Åkerström giving the songs "a hitherto unheard earthbound realism".

Taube recorded work by the poet Nils Ferlin (1898–1961), whose poems were mostly put to music by Lille Bror Söderlundh. Taube also recorded an album with songs by the Swedish songwriter and musician Ulf Peder Olrog, one with Swedish translations of songs by French songwriter Léo Ferré, and one with Swedish translations of songs by Greek composer Mikis Theodorakis.

In 2015, Taube took part in Så mycket bättre, a reality show broadcast on TV4 in which musical artists attempt to make their own version of other artists' well-known songs.

=== Selected discography ===
Swedish Folk Songs and Ballads

- Released: 1954
- Format: LP
- Label: Folkways Records
- Writer: Evert Taube
- Tracks: "Viljen I veta och viljen I förstå", "Och flickan hon går i dansen", "Brevet från Lillan", "Tänker du att jag förlorader är?", "Om sommaren sköna", "Sven i Rosengård", "Och jungfrun gick åt killan", "Jag gick mig ut en afton", Uti vår hage, "Vårvinder friska leka och viska", "Jag unnar dig ändå allt gott"

Nils Ferlin

- Released: 15 November 1988
- Format: CD
- Label: EMI
- Writer: Nils Ferlin, Lille Bror Söderlundh
- Tracks: "En liten konstnär", "Den stora kometen", "Vilse", "Goggles", "Inte ens en grå liten fågel", "Får jag lämna några blommor", "På Arendorffs tid", "När skönheten kom till byn", "En valsmelodi", "Stjärnorna kvittar det lika", "På källaren Fimmelstången", "Om våren", "Brådska", "Pulex Irritans människoloppa", "Nasarevalsen", "Som ett ödehus", "Vid diktens port"

Taube Sjunger Taube

- Released: 2001
- Label: EMI Sweden
- Writer: Evert Taube
- Tracks: "Fritiof och Carmencita", "Fragancia", "Flickan i Havanna", "Karl Alfred och Ellinor", "Så skimrande var aldrig havet", "Eldarevalsen", "Linnea", "Inbjudan till Bohuslän", "Brevet från Lillan", "Stockholmsmelodi", "Calle Schewens vals", "Sommarnatt", "Havsörnsvalsen", " Nocturne", "Vals på Mysingen", "Min älskling", "Dans på Sunnanö", "Sjösala vals", "Änglamark", "Så länge skutan kan gå"

Om Sommaren

- Released: 2004
- Label: EMI Sweden
- Writer: Evert Taube
- Tracks: "Dansen på Sunnanö", "Änglamark", "Sommarnatt", "Solig morgon", "Havsörnsvals", "Här, Rose-Marie, syns blåa Nämdöfjärden... (Rosemari Vid Nämdö Fjärd)", "Sjösala vals", "Vals på Ängön", "Pierina", "Inbjudan till Bohuslän", "Sjösalavår", "Vals i Furusund", "Ellinors vals", "Älskliga blommor små"

Alderville Road: Ord Och Toner Av Evert Taube

- Released: 1 January 2007
- Format: CD
- Label: EMI
- Writer: Evert Taube
- Singles: "Intro: Alderville Road", "Bibbi", "Morgon I Ligurien", "Målaren Och Maria Pia", "Vackert Så", "Brittisk Ballad", "Albertina", "Och Skulle Det Så Vara...", "Fragancia", "Linnéa", "Balladen om Gustaf Blom från Borås", "Sjösalavår", "Här är den sköna sommar", "Som Stjärnor Små"

Diamanter

- Released: 2008
- Label: EMI
- Tracks: "ÄLskliga blommor små", "Balladen om briggen 'Blue Bird' av Hull", "Vals i Valparaiso", "Västanvind", "Som stjärnor små", "Sololá", "Oxdragarsång", "Mary Strand", "Linnéa", "Morgonsång på Baggensfjärden", "Ellinors vals", "Möte i monsunen", "Fritiof och Carmencita", "Fritiof Anderssons polka", "Brevet från Lillan", "Dansen på Sunnanö", "Inbjudan till Bohuslän", "Solig morgon", "Vals på Ängön", "Den glade bagar'n i San Remo", "Brudvals", "Sjösalavår"

Carl Michael Bellman: Fredmans Epistlar & Sånger, Sjungna Av Sven-Bertil Taube

- Released: 16 February 2010 (originally 2 albums, 1960 and 1963)
- Format: CD
- Label: EMI
- Writer: Carl Michael Bellman
- Tracks: "Epistel 1", "Epistel No. 2: Na, skrufva fiolen", "Epistel No. 7: Kärlek och Bacchus helgas min skal", "Epistel No. 73: Fan i fåtöljerna!", "Sång No. 21: Så lunka vi så småningom", "Epistel No. 33: Stolta stad", "Gubben Noak", "Joachim uti Babylon (Joachim lived in Babylon), song for voice", "Hvila vid denna källa (Sit down around the spring here), song for voice", "Hör klockorna med ängslig klang (Hear bells give out a fearful boom), song for voice", "Sång No. 19: Ack, döden ar en faslig björn", "Epistel 79", "Träd Fram Du Nattens Gud", "Epistel No. 4: Hej, musikanter", "Epistel No. 45: Tjenare, Mollberg! Hur är det fatt?", "Epistel No. 81: Märk hur vår skugga", "Epistel No. 27: Gubben är gammal – urverket dras", "Epistel No. 38: Undan ur vägen", "Epistel No. 25: Blåsen nu alla!", "Epistel No 23: Ack du min moder", "Epistel No. 50: Febus förnyar"

== Acting career ==
Taube also started an acting career that took him to London, where he performed in theater and musicals, notably as Prince Albert in I and Albert. He won a role on the television series Upstairs, Downstairs. In the 1970s, Taube tried to find work as a film actor, and had some minor roles, most notably in the 1976 World War II drama The Eagle Has Landed and a starring role as a US agent in the 1971 film version of Alistair MacLean's novel Puppet on a Chain.

During the 1980s and 1990s, Taube starred in a number of Swedish films and television series, while still active as a musician.

Taube starred in the Swedish film version of Stieg Larsson's novel, The Girl with the Dragon Tattoo, in the role of Henrik Vanger. The film was awarded the Best Film, and Taube was nominated for the Best Supporting Actor award, at the 45th Guldbagge Awards.

In 2005, Taube took part in the first season of Stjärnorna på slottet on Sveriges Television, where he discussed his long career.

=== Awards ===
- 1995: 30th Guldbagge Awards – "Best Actor in a Leading Role" in "Händerna"
- 2011: 47th Guldbagge Awards – "Best Actor in a Leading Role" in "En enkel till Antibes" (A One-way Trip to Antibes)

=== Nominations ===
- 1997: 32nd Guldbagge Awards – "Best Actor in a Supporting Role" in Jerusalem
- 2009: 45th Guldbagge Awards – "Best Actor in a Supporting Role" in The Girl with the Dragon Tattoo

=== Selected filmography ===
- Hugs and Kisses (1967)
- Sixtynine 69 (1969)
- The Buttercup Chain (1970)
- Puppet on a Chain (1970)
- The Eagle Has Landed (1976)
- Game for Vultures (1979)
- Taube håller hov (The Court of Taube, 1985)
- August Strindberg: Ett liv (August Strindberg: A life, 1985)
- Folk och rövare i Kamomilla stad (When the Robbers Came to Cardamom Town, 1988)
- Codename: Kyril (1988, TV)
- Ålder okänd (1991)
- Händerna (In The Hands, 1994)
- Sånt är livet (That's life, 1996)
- Jerusalem (1996)
- Slutspel (Endgame, 1997)
- Jobbet och jag (Work and I, 1998)
- Art (1999)
- London Voodoo (2004)
- Arn: The Knight Templar (2007)
- The Girl with the Dragon Tattoo (2009)
- En enkel till Antibes (A One-way Trip to Antibes, 2011)

=== Theatre ===
- 1999: Annie as Oliver Warbucks – piece directed by Trond Lie
