= Bellman. Biografin =

2019 biography of Carl Michael Bellman

- Cover of first edition, with painting of The View from Brunnsbacken across Saltsjön, Stockholm
- Author: Carina Burman
- Illustrator: various artists
- Cover artist: Johan Sevenbom
- Language: Swedish
- Subject: Carl Michael Bellman
- Genre: Literary criticism
- Published: 2019
- Publisher: Albert Bonniers Förlag
- Media type: hardback
- Pages: 751
- ISBN: 978-91-0-014179-0

Bellman. Biografin ("Bellman. The Biography") is a 2019 biography of the Swedish 18th-century songwriter and performer Carl Michael Bellman by the novelist and biographer Carina Burman. Bellman is a leading figure in Swedish song, known especially for his song collections Fredman's Epistles and Fredman's Songs.

Burman's book has been described as ambitious by its many reviewers, who have admired its lively style and the detailed academic research on which it is based. Some have found its definitive-sounding title provocative, as it is not the first biography of Bellman; others, that it says little about his music, although he was at once a poet and a musician.

== Context ==
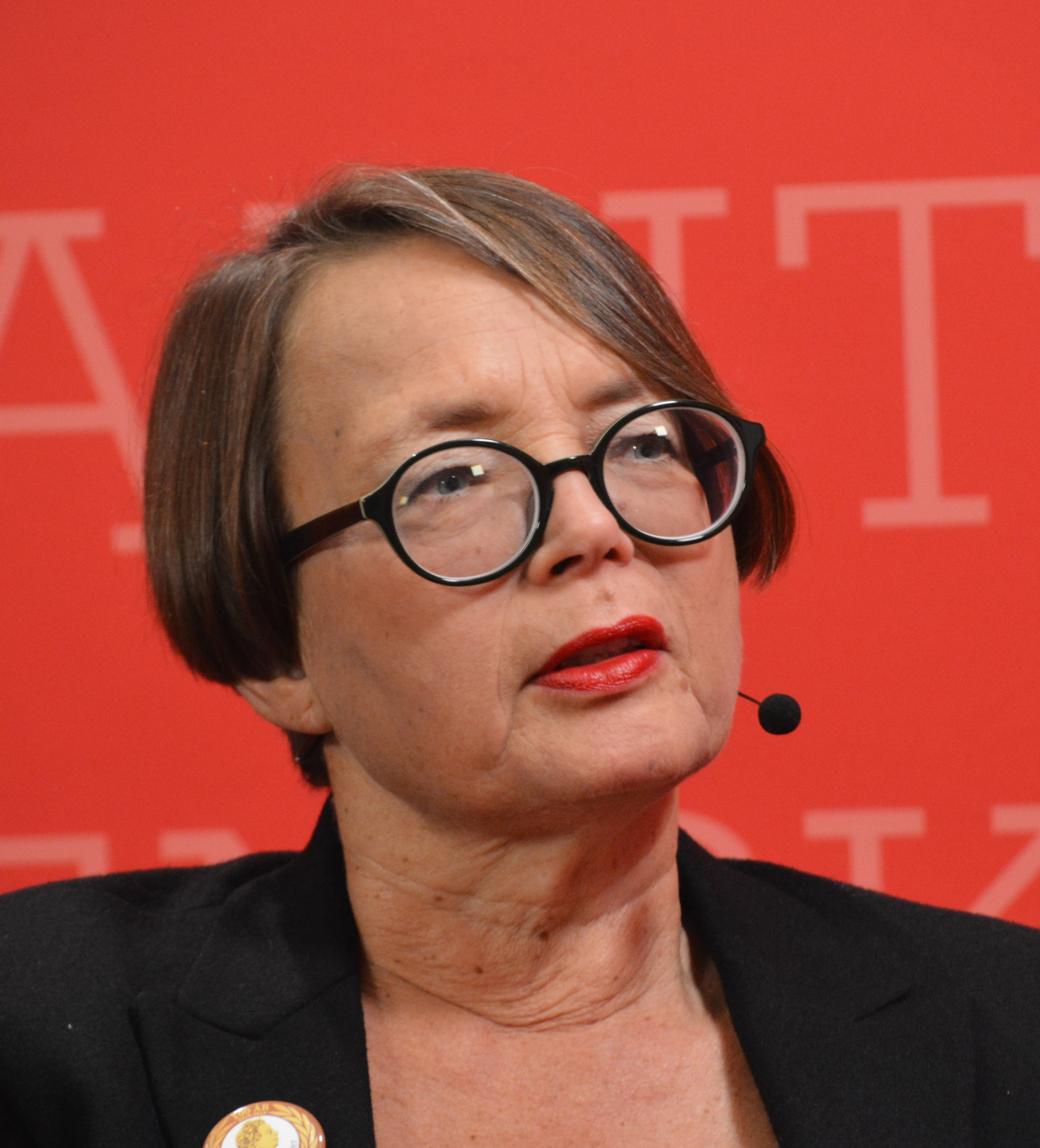
The book's author, Carina Burman, in 2019

Carl Michael Bellman is the central figure in Swedish song, known principally for his 1790 Fredman's Epistles and his 1791 Fredman's Songs. Bellman played the cittern, accompanying himself as he performed his songs at the royal court.

Fredman's Epistles is a collection of 82 poems set to music; it depicts everything from Rococo-themed pastorale with a cast of gods and demigods from classical antiquity to laments for the effects of Brännvin-drinking, tavern-scenes, and apparent improvisations. The lyrics, based on the lives of Bellman's contemporaries in Gustavian-age Sweden, describe a gallery of fictional and semi-fictional characters and events in Stockholm. Jean Fredman, an alcoholic former watchmaker, is the central character and fictional narrator. Fredman's Songs is a mixed collection of songs, some on the same themes as the Epistles – love, drinking, and death, some loyally royalist, some to his friends, some pastoral, and some humorously biblical.

Carina Burman is a Swedish novelist and literature scholar. She has researched Swedish 18th and 19th century literature; her novels too have historical motifs.

== Book ==
=== Publication history ===
Bellman. Biografin was published in hardback by Albert Bonniers in 2019.

=== Synopsis ===
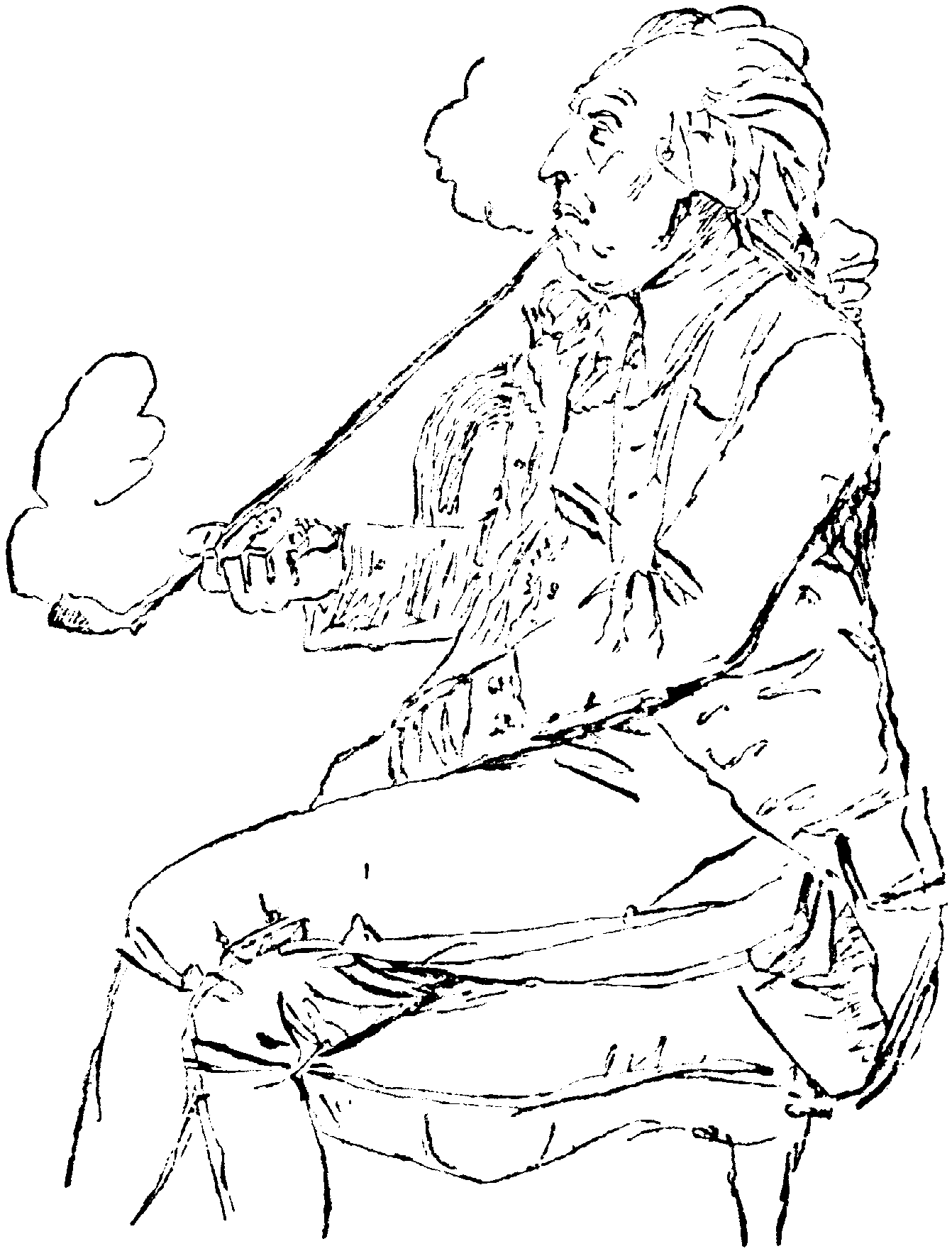
Portrait of Carl Michael Bellman, drawn by the sculptor Johan Tobias Sergel, 1792, one of the many images in the book

The book is arranged like a play, in three "acts", complete with a dramatis personae listing the "Gentlemen" and "Ladies" in Bellman's life.

In "Act 1 Morning. The Era of Freedom (Frihetstiden) 1740–1771", Burman describes the career possibilities opening up for the young Bellman, though his financial problems and missed career steps limited his progress.

In "Act 2 Midday. The Light under Gustav III 1771–1789", she narrates how Bellman's contact with the new king gave him a measure of real literary success, but that he limited his future by clinging to the Bacchanalian in his poems, as seen in his 1783 verse drama Bacchi Tempel. He was overtaken by a younger generation of educated literary figures, especially his rival, the poet and critic Johan Henrik Kellgren.

In "Act 3 Evening. The Dark Years 1789–1795", Burman describes Bellman's last years. There was no happy ending: his career continued to decline both financially and socially, reflecting the political changes in the Gustavian age. He died in poverty, of pneumonia. His rivalry with Kellgren had ended with reconciliation, as Kellgren helped him to get Fredman's Epistles published, and wrote a foreword to the book. Burman provides a detailed commentary on the Epistles and how they changed on the way to publication. She describes, too, his wealthy bourgeois patrons, and the women who both inspired him and helped him in his later years, showing how his poems functioned in social terms.

=== Materials ===
The biography is illustrated with numerous contemporary paintings and engravings by contemporary artists, often full-page or double-page spreads, in colour and monochrome. The works include portraits, landscapes of Stockholm and other relevant places, and sketches by Bellman and his friends.

The text is supported by a list of Bellman's brothers and sisters and a family tree; by some fifty pages of notes identifying sources and debatable points, together forming a detailed academic apparatus setting out Burman's position vis-a-vis other Bellman scholars and biographers like Lars Lönnroth and Gunnar Hillbom; a full list of sources; an index to Bellman works cited in the text; and an index of persons mentioned in the text.

== Reception ==
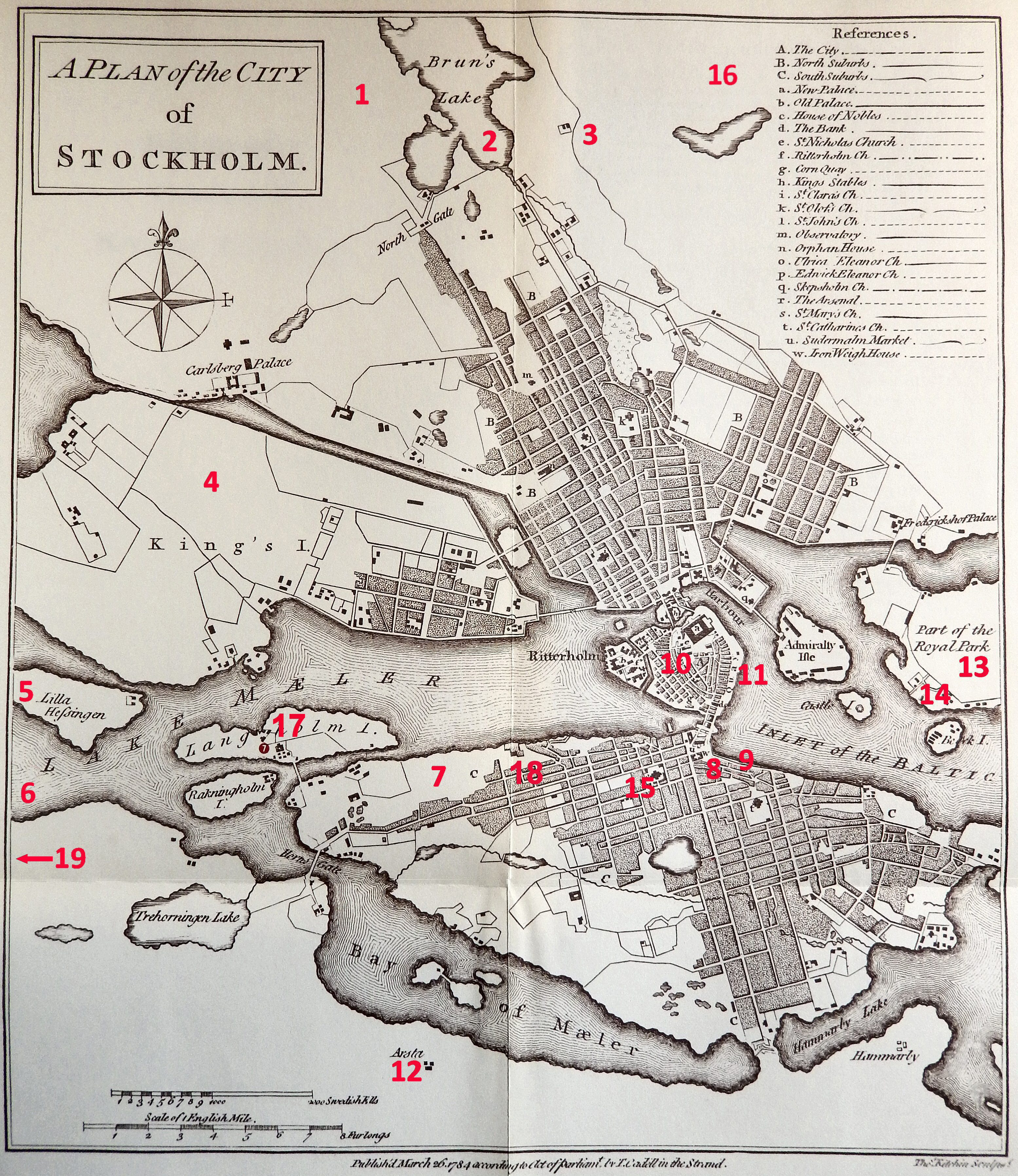
Map of Bellman's Stockholm, places of interest for his Fredman's Epistles and Songs on map from William Coxe's Travels into Poland, Russia, Sweden, and Denmark, 1784. 1 Haga park (S. 64) – 2 Brunnsviken – 3 Första Torpet (Ep. 80) – 4 Kungsholmen – 5 Hessingen (Ep. 48) – 6 Lake Mälaren (Ep. 48) – 7 Södermalm – 8 Urvädersgränd – 9 Lokatten tavern (Ep. 11, Ep. 59, Ep. 77), Bruna Dörren tavern (Ep. 24, Ep. 38) – 10 Gamla stan (Ep. 5, Ep. 9, Ep. 23, Ep. 28, Ep. 79) – 11 Skeppsbron Quay (Ep. 33) – 12 Årsta Castle – 13 Djurgården Park – (Ep. 25, Ep. 51, Ep. 82) – 14 Gröna Lund (Ep. 12, Ep. 62) – 15 Bellman's birthplace – 16 Fiskartorpet (Ep. 71) – 17 Lilla Sjötullen (Bellmanmuseet) (Ep. 48) – 18 Bensvarvars tavern (Ep. 40) 19 Rostock tavern (Ep. 45)

Stefan Ekman of the University of Skövde, reviewing the book for 1700-tal: Nordic Journal for Eighteenth-Century Studies, notes that Bellman has two audiences in the 21st century: researchers and an educated [Scandinavian] public. In his view, Burman's book is aimed at both groups of readers. He comments that the title suggests an ambition to be the definitive biography of Bellman; or perhaps an allusion to the impossibility of making a biography comprehensive, given that Bellman was not the central figure in the Gustavian age, and that he had left few clues to his personal life. Other biographers had attempted to fill in the gaps by assuming that the wildly Bacchanalian life of the characters in Fredman's Epistles reflected Bellman's own life, without taking into account the meaning of the text, its humorous genre, or the public persona of the elderly poet. In Ekman's view, Burman's book avoids such errors. He notes, too, that the detailed academic notes at the end of the book constitute a sustained dialogue with other Bellman scholars, setting out Burman's position with respect to the many sources that she cites.

The translator Paul Norlén, reviewing Bellman. Biografin for the Swedish Book Review, writes that despite the earlier "biographical studies" of Bellman by the poet Lars Huldén in 1964 and by Paul Britten Austin in English in 1967, and the "fictional autobiography" Fukta din aska ('Moisten your Ashes') by Ernst Brunner in 2002, there was no scholarly literary biography, as Brunner had noted in an afterword. In Norlen's view, Burman has written such a book, creating "an engaging and entertaining account of an eighteenth-century life and a legendary literary figure". He notes that Burman's stated purpose was to "paint Bellman’'s portrait based on his surroundings". Bellman, he writes, spent his whole life in a Stockholm of 70,000 people and 700 taverns, barring brief visits to Uppsala and Södermanland (and possibly Norway to escape his creditors). His life can, he notes, be accurately mapped to places in 18th century Stockholm; and he can be followed, too, via his often dire financial situation as his creditors relentlessly pursued him, including to debtor's prison. In Norlén's view, Burman writes "eminently readable" prose, and "she occasionally makes striking comparisons to present-day phenomena", for instance likening the young authors around the king, who was interested in culture, to "teenage girls around a boy band". Bellman was one of those around the king, writing homage pieces like Gustafs skål ('A toast to Gustav'), and relying on him for patronage, including a sinecure job with the state lottery.

Lars Linder, reviewing the book for Dagens Nyheter, writes that it is a large book with a "cocky" title, but that in the end it remains remarkably silent about Bellman himself. Johanna Paulson, in Svenska Dagbladet, calls the book ambitious, and writes that Burman succeeds in bringing the figure of Sweden's national bard to life with a combination of lively writing and detailed knowledge.

Mikael Timm, for Sveriges Radio, states that this is an imposing, definitive book; much has been written about Bellman, and Burman seems to have read all of it, with a "tsunami" of citations. He adds that Bellman wrote more than 1700 poems, with so many dire rhymes that he was astonished, wondering how Bellman's reputation could have survived. He answers his own question by saying that those that are good are simply wonderful. All the same, even when one has been captivated by the poetry, it remains hard to understand the man and his times, and in his view Burman presents these splendidly.

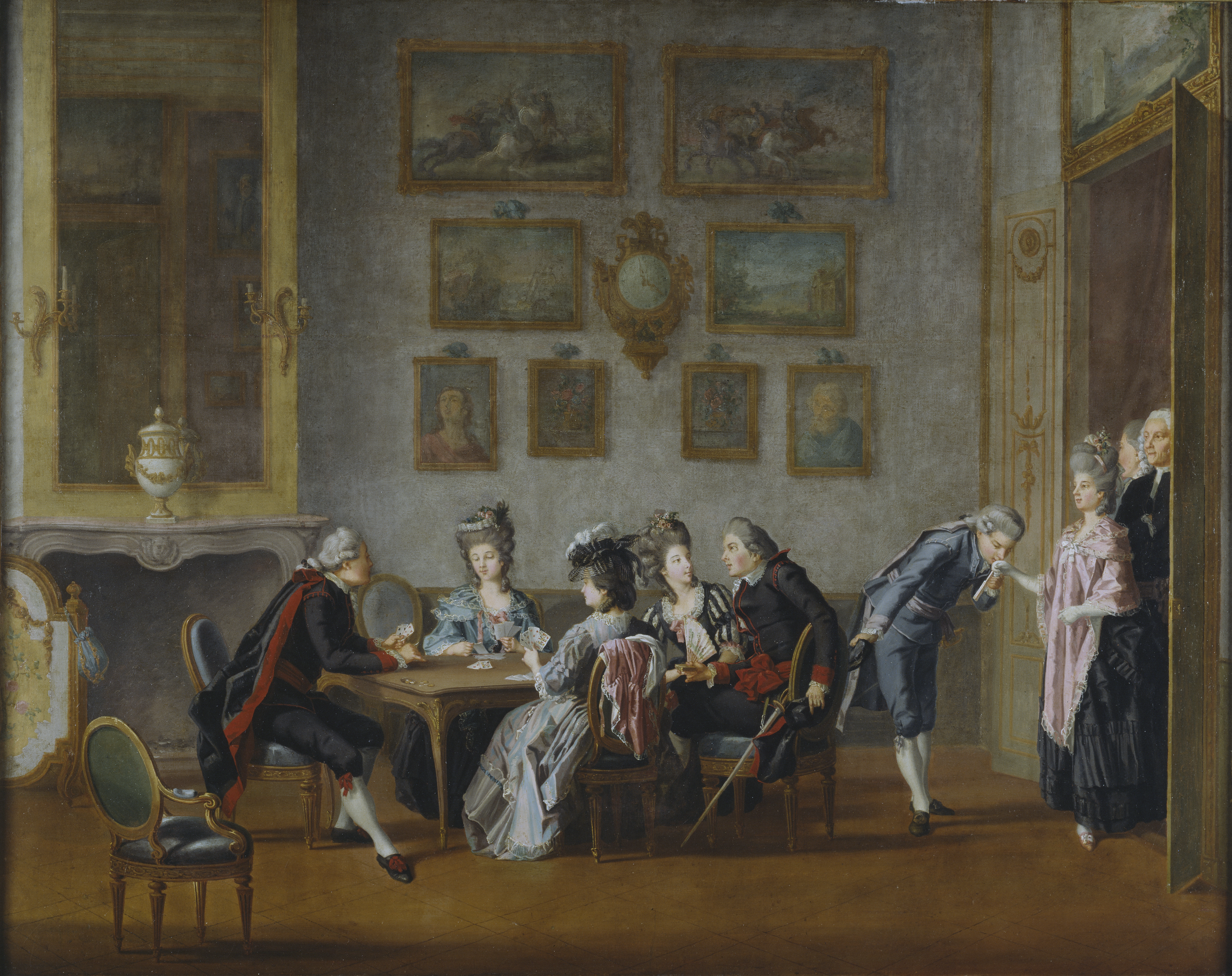
Card-Party in the Home of Anna Charlotta von Stapelmohr and Elis Schröderheim, prosperous friends of Bellman. Elis is greeting princess Sofia Albertina on the left. 1782 painting by Pehr Hilleström

The journalist and translator Nina Lekander, reviewing the book in Expressen, notes that the title had been called "cocky", but in Burman's case the definitive tone was well-merited by this "drop-dead gorgeous and super-thick book", complete with "an almost Russian blizzard of names", and excellent illustrations, such as those by Bellman's friend Johan Tobias Sergel. She finds Burman's language fantasy-rich, full of the sound of the 18th century, as the book depicts the poet whose life was poised between the gutter and genius. She wonders how it was that the king did not welcome him into the Swedish Academy, where Kellgren slipped in so easily. Bellman hesitated, held back from engaging with the authorities, except in his fictional Order of Bacchus. Lekander notes the absurd in Bellman's life – for example, that this humane and witty man, hopeless with numbers, should find a job in the National Bank. She notes that Burman covers it all, down to Bellman's troubadour successors like Cornelis Vreeswijk and Fred Åkerström, though she misses an account of his influence on odd figures like Joakim Pirinen or the poet Gunnar Ekelöf.

Magnus Ringgren, in his review for Aftonbladet, calls it a mammoth beast of a book. He notes that despite the title, there have been at least three Bellman biographies in the past half-century. He respects Burman's scholarship, and observes that the publisher clearly expects an audience beyond the specialist, given the cost of production. He states that the tone is "light and free", and he finds especially good Burman's comparisons between modern times and Bellman's period.

Maria Mi Wegelius, interviewing Burman for the Finnish broadcaster Yle, quotes her as liking Bellman's self-description as "a man of very little depth who doesn't ask if the sun rises or the earth shrugs its shoulders", and joking that Bellman "seems not to have been specially smart, actually". Burman added that Bellman was a fantastic poet, an excellent musician, and not bad at drawing either; he would be the perfect guest at a cocktail party, but too unpredictable to invite to Sweden's National Book Day.

The psychotherapist Jakob Carlander, reviewing the book for Upsala Nya Tidning, writes that in Bellman's world, everything has two sides: on the bright side, intoxication, dance, and love; on the dark side, angst, hangover, and a longing for death. He writes that Bellman was never properly understood, as he belonged to the Baroque in a time when neoclassicism had taken over. In Carlander's view, Burman knows Bellman's time, navigating his literary games with myths, drinking songs and bible texts; she writes with elegance and lucidity, and knows when to exchange her literary glasses for psychological observation, to the voice of the narrator or to "empathic understanding and compassion". In short, Carlander feels that the book may be long but it is a joy to read; it is full of the joy and melancholy of Fredman's Epistles and Songs.

The historian Bo Eriksson writes that Burman's main strength is in literary analysis, highlighting the "voyeuristic attitude" of the Epistles, and the key role of metamorphosis in his poems. In Burman's words, "Everything is commonly metamorphosed through contact with the divinity - with Ulla [Winblad], but also with the mythological creatures who follow in her footsteps". Eriksson adds that the book is beautifully designed and edited, and richly illustrated.

Hanna Höglund, reviewing the work for Göteborgs-Posten, writes that Burman intended to provide "a high, colourful window" into the cathedral of Bellman research, "where the sun shines in", and that in that aim she had succeeded. But Höglund feels that the book lacks music: in her view, Bellman was both poet and musician, and Burman's plan is "text, text, text". On Bellman's art of song, the reader rarely learns more than that an Epistle was set to "a widely known melody" from an opera, or occasionally perhaps by Bellman himself. Höglund complains that it is page 484 before Burman notes that Bellman contrasts the style of the music he has chosen with the text (of Epistle no. 12, "Gråt Fader Berg och spela"), where some of society's unfortunates seem absurdly to be dancing a courtly minuet, and that she barely touches on the subject again. Höglund wonders why Burman did not cover Bellman's music better, whether she felt it unimportant, did not need mentioning, or that it was beyond her competence.

== Sources ==
- Burman, Carina (2019). Bellman. Biografin [Bellman. The Biography] (in Swedish). Stockholm: Albert Bonniers Förlag. ISBN 978-91-0-014179-0.
