= Martin Best =

British musician

Martin Best (born 13 April 1942) is an English singer, lutenist, guitarist, and composer. Best has been active mainly in early music including Renaissance music, minstrel songs and the French troubadour traditions, in works related to Shakespeare, such as the sonnets and music to Shakespeare plays, and also in songs of the Swedish ballad tradition. He has often performed in constellations named Martin Best Consort and Martin Best Medieval Ensemble.

Best got a position at the Royal Shakespeare Company in the mid-1960s and remained associated with them for over 30 years as an actor-singer, musician and composer.

His first works in the Swedish ballad tradition were the songs of Carl Michael Bellman, Sweden's unofficial national poet, who is sometimes considered the starting point of the Swedish ballad tradition. Best recorded three albums with Bellman's songs, mainly from the song collections Fredman's Epistles in translations by Paul Britten Austin, with some additions from Fredman's Songs as well as other Bellman works: To Carl Michael with Love (1975), Bellman in Britain (1978), and Songs of Carl Michael Bellman. Songs from the two first albums were later collected on a CD, also named To Carl Michael with Love. Göran Forsling wrote that "With his flexible voice and his masterly treatment of the guitar and the cyster, the latter a lute-like instrument that Bellman also played, [Best] is a worthy transmitter of the Bellman tradition." Forsling notes that Sven-Bertil Taube and Fred Åkerström gave Bellman's songs a new, earthy realism ideal for the 20th century, but argues that Best is closer to how Bellman must have sounded, "though not theatrical enough if the ear-witnesses' are to be relied on. He is fresh and lively, his diction is excellent and his rhythmic acuity is striking."

Other Swedish song poets performed by Best include Birger Sjöberg (1885–1929), with one album released in 1979.

== Discography ==
Original recordings. Years are release years, when such have been available.

- 1972 (or earlier). Martin Best & Edward Flower: The Art of the Minstrel – Lute Songs, LP.
- 1974. Martin Best Consort: The Warwickshire Lad, LP
- 1975. Martin Best Consort: To Carl Michael with Love, LP. Songs by Carl Michael Bellman.
- 1976. Peggy Ashcroft and Martin Best: Sense and Nonsense, LP. Songs and rhymes for children.
- 1976. Martin Best Consort: The Fine Old English Tory Times, LP. English 18th century ballads.
- 1976. Martin Best Consort: The Pirate's Serenade, LP.
- 1977. Martin Best: Knight On the Road, LP. With amplified instruments.
- 1978. Martin Best: Bellman in Britain, LP. Songs by Carl Michael Bellman.
- 1978. Martin Best: The Dawn of Romance, LP. Songs and music of the early troubadours of Provence.
- 1979. Martin Best: William Shakespeare: Ages of Song, LP. Songs from Shakespeare plays.
- 1979. Martin Best et al.: Desdemonalisa, LP. Pop music.
- 1979. Martin Best et al.: When First I Ever Saw You, LP. Swedish ballad songs by Birger Sjöberg, English trad. songs etc.
- 1982(?) Martin Best Medieval Ensemble: The Last of the Troubadours – The Art & Times of Guiraut Riquier, LP. Later reissued in the 1999 CD box Music from the Age of Chivalry. French ballads.
- 1983. Martin Best Medieval Ensemble: The Dante Troubadours, LP. Later reissued in the 1999 CD box Music from the Age of Chivalry. French ballads by Bertran de Born, Guiraut de Bornelh, and others.
- 1983 (?). Martin Best: Songs of Carl Michael Bellman, LP. Solo recording – voice, guitar, cittern – with Bellman songs.
- 1983. Göran Fristorp and Martin Best: Waggoner's song, LP. Swedish ballads, some English traditional material, some Best/Fristorp compositions.
- ? (recorded 1983). Martin Best Medieval Ensemble: Songs of Chivalry, LP? Also in the 1999 CD box Music from the Age of Chivalry. French ballads by Thibaut de Navarre etc.
- ? (recorded 1984). Martin Best Medieval Ensemble: Cantigas of Santa Maria of Alfonso X El Sabio, LP? Also in the 1999 CD box Music from the Age of Chivalry. Songs from Cantigas de Santa Maria.
- 1987. Martin Best: The Testament of Tristan, LP/CD. Songs of Bernart de Ventadorn.
- ? (recorded 1988). Martin Best Medieval Ensemble: Thys Yool – A Medieval Christmas.
- 1990/1991. Nils Lindberg, Martin Best, Lena Willemark, Fresk Quartet, Swedish Radio Choir: O mistress mine : a garland of Elizabethan poetry, CD. Shakespeare etc.
- ? (recorded 1994). Martin Best Medieval Ensemble: Forgotten Provence – Music-making in the South of France, 1150–1550, CD. Also in the 1999 CD box Music from the Age of Chivalry.
- ? (recorded 1996?) Martin Best Consort: Amor de Lonh – The Distant Love of the Troubadours, CD. Also in the 1999 CD box Music from the Age of Chivalry.
