= Fritiof och Carmencita =

Song
- Language: Swedish
- Released: 1937
- Songwriter(s): Evert Taube

"Fritiof och Carmencita" (Fritiof and Carmencita), also called Samborombón, is a 1937 Swedish song written by Evert Taube, published in the 1937 songbook Evert Taubes bästa. The song is about Fritiof Andersson who rides to Samborombón where he dances tango with the pretty girl Carmencita at an inn. He asks her to marry him but she refuses, saying she will soon marry another man.

Estonian cover was made by Marko Matvere and Väikeste Lõõtspillide Ühing in 1996.
