= Fredmans sånger =

Collection of poems and songs by Carl Michael Bellman

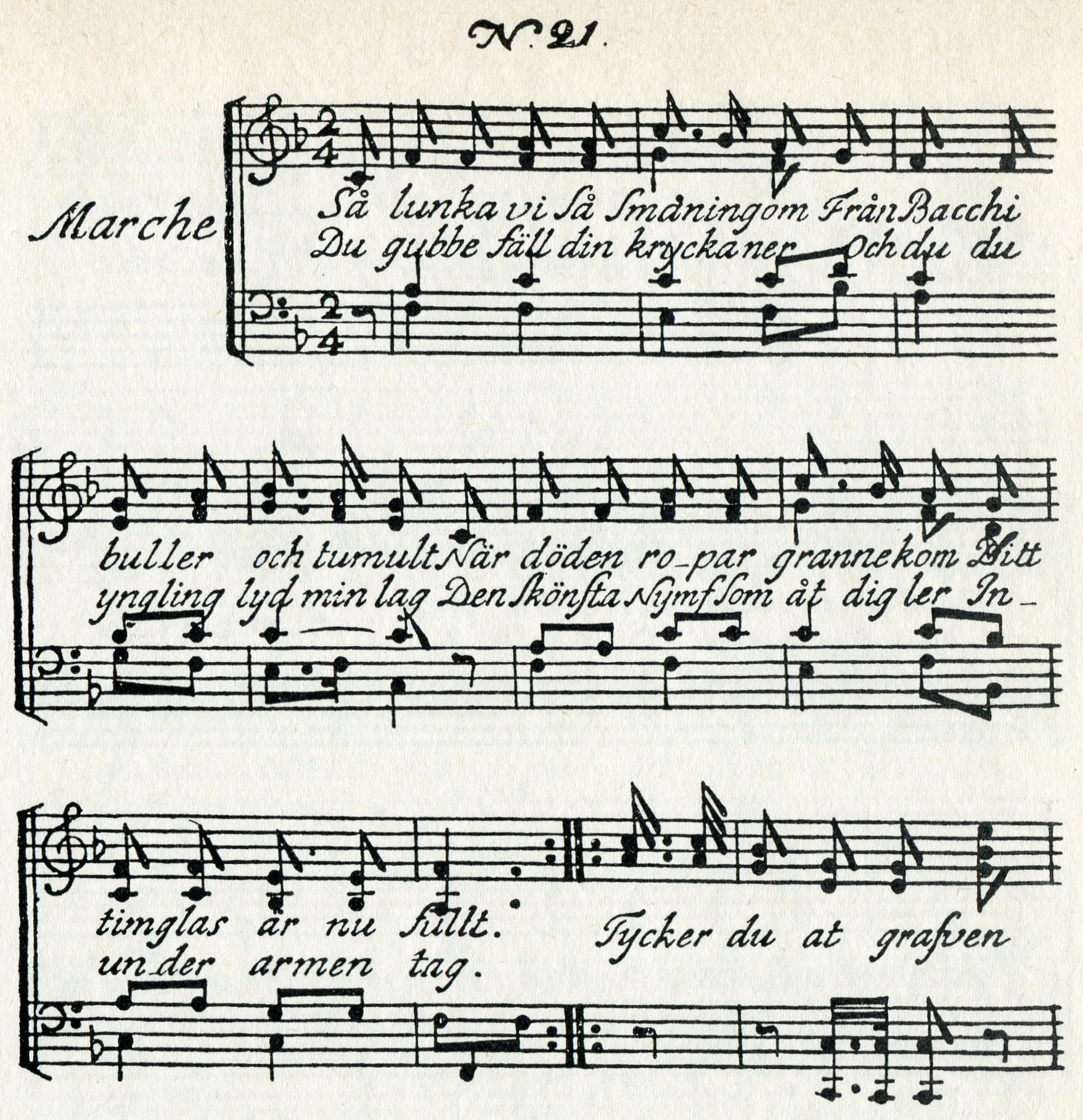
Start of Fredman's Song No: 21, Så lunka vi så småningom (So we eventually amble). Marche, 2/4 time, 1791. The song mentions Bacchus, death, and "the fairest nymph".

Fredmans sånger (in English, Fredman's Songs or Songs of Fredman) is a collection of 65 poems and songs published in 1791 by the Swedish poet Carl Michael Bellman.

As a follow-up to Fredmans epistlar from the previous year, the book contains songs from a longer period. There are bible travesties ("Gubben Noak", "Gubben Loth och hans gamla Fru", "Joachim uti Babylon"), drinking songs ("Bacchi Proclama", "Til buteljen"), rococo pastorales (Opp Amaryllis!), and lyrical passages ("Fjäriln vingad syns på Haga").

Several of these songs including Gubben Noak and Fjäriln vingad are known by heart by many Swedes.

== Grouping of the songs ==
Bellman had public performances known as the Bacchi orden ("Order of Bacchus"), Bacchus being the Roman god of wine. These consisted largely of travesties of the chivalric and society orders of the time, some of which Bellman himself was a member. These orders held strict ceremonials, and members were often expected to live a decent and "christian life". To be knighted in the Order of Bacchus, the candidate had to have been observed publicly lying in a stupor in the gutter, at least twice. Several of the songs from these performances are collected in Songs of Fredman (songs 1–6).

Bellman wrote drinking songs and bible travesties, and also mixed the two genres. The holy men from the Old Testament were portrayed as drunks. The travesties became popular all over the country, being spread (anonymously) by broadsheets and transcripts. Some of Bellman's bible travesties offended the church authorities. As shown in a 1768 letter from the Lund chapter, the church attempted to collect all prints and transcripts in circulation of the most popular song, "Gubben Noak", as well as other songs. It and eight other biblical travesties are songs 35–43. There is some thematic grouping among the songs. For instance, songs 18–21 are about death, 35–43 are biblical parodies and 47–54 are part of a song play about "Bacchus's bankruptcy" (Bacchi konkurs).

== Songs ==
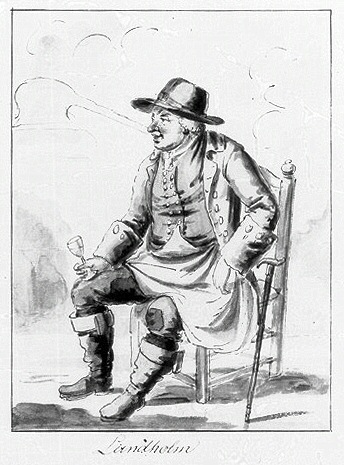
Ink and watercolor drawing by Elis Chiewitz of Brandy-Distiller Lundholm, described by Carl Michael Bellman in Fredman's Songs, No. 6, with the words "If ever thy wife kissed thy chin in her life, she'd drunk have been."

Songs
Number	First line	Type	Notes
1	Bacchi Härolder med guld och beslag	Order of Bacchus	
2	Ordens-Härolder ta'n Edra spiror	Order of Bacchus	
3	Se menigheten	Order of Bacchus	
4	Hör Pukor och Trompeter!	Order of Bacchus	
5a	Så vandra våre store män	Order of Bacchus	
5b	Se svarta böljans hvita drägg	Order of Bacchus	A lament as Johan Glock is led across the waters by Charon. "Farewell to wine and double ale".
5c	Så slår min Glock nu locket til	Order of Bacchus	
6	Hör klockorna med ängsligt dån	Order of Bacchus	On brandy-distiller Lundholm, dead. "If ever thy wife kiss'd thy chin in her life, she'd drunk have been."
7	Kärlek och Bacchus helgas min skål	Rococo	To love and Bacchus, with Astrild and Venus.
8	Ack om vi hade, god' vänner, en Så		
9	Nå ödmjukaste tjenare, gunstig Herr Värd!		Song at dinner, celebrating food ... and drink
10	Supa klockan öfver tolf	Drinking song	If I become rich I'll buy new trousers, coat, new shoes... and have another drink before we die
11	Portugal, Spanjen, Stora Britannien		Allegretto in 3/8 time; bombs and rockets shall wake us with thunder, as our dragoons drink our health from crystal cups
12	Venus, Minerva	Rococo	(Venus, Minerva, Pallas, Clio, Jupiter, Pluto, Apollo, "all Olympus", Bacchus, Pan, Sylva, Phoebus, Melpomene, Cupid)
13	Det var rätt curieust; i går aftons		Klubben Lokatten (the Lynx Tavern)
14	Hade jag sextusende daler		
15	Kom sköna Källar-flickor		
16	Är jag född så vil jag lefva		
17	I Januari månad, Gutår!		
18	Snart är jag rykt ur tidens sköte	Death	
19	Ack! döden är en faslig björn	Death	Bacchus
20	Mina Björnar samlen eder	Death	
21	Så lunka vi så småningom	Death	The gravediggers discuss whether the grave is too deep, and drink brandy
22	Ach hör ett roligt giftermål!		
23	Så slutas våra Sorgedar		
24	Bortt vid en grind uti en skog		
25	Cornelius lefde femti år		
26	Ur vägen och vik		
27	Ur vägen För gamla Schmidtens bår!		
28	Movitz skulle bli Student		
29	Grannas Lasse! Klang på lyran		
30	Hör Trumpetarn, alarm!		
31	Opp Amaryllis! vakna min lilla!	Rococo	(Amaryllis, Neptune, dolphins, naked sirens, Thyrsis), ostensibly about fishing
32	Träd fram du Nattens Gud	Aftonkväde (Evening poem); Rococo	(Flora, Timanthes, Alexis, Pan, Neptune, Eol, Arachne, Vulcan, Pluto, Cyclops, fauns)
33	Magistraten uti T**** fiker		
34	På Gripsholm är alt för roligt		
35	Gubben Noach, Gubben Noach	Biblical travesty	"Noah rowed, Noah rowed, from his old ark, bought bottles, such as are sold, to drink, to drink, in our new park." Most Swedes can sing this unaided.
36	Gubben Loth och hans gamla Fru	Biblical travesty	
37	Glada Bröder när vi dricka	Biblical travesty	
38	En Potiphars hustru med sköna maner	Biblical travesty	
39	Alt förvandlas, alt går omkull!	Biblical travesty	
40	Ahasverus var så mägtig	Biblical travesty	
41	Joachim uti Babylon	Biblical travesty	"Joachim from Babylon had a wife Susanna. Empty your flagon, Cheers for this person!"
42	Judith var en riker Enka	Biblical travesty	
43	Adams skål, vår gamla far!	Biblical travesty	"To Adam's health, our old father!" ... "Let us drink"
44	Gamle bror Jockum, klang vid denna rågan!		
45	Om ödet mig skull' skicka		
46	M. Hur du dig vänder		
47	Bacchus snyfta, gret och stamma	Bacchus's bankruptcy	
48	November den femtonde dagen	Bacchus's bankruptcy	
49	Som nu och emedan	Bacchus's bankruptcy	
50	Parterna syns kring Bacchus så röder	Bacchus's bankruptcy	
51	Utterquist - Ja!	Bacchus's bankruptcy	
52	Närvarande vid fluidum	Bacchus's bankruptcy	
53	Som af Handlingarne, Bröder	Bacchus's bankruptcy	
54	I närvarande Parter	Bacchus's bankruptcy	
55	Mollberg höll flaskan och Bredström satt		
56	När jag har en plåt at dricka		
57	Sjung och läs nu Bacchi böner		
58	Nej fåfängt! hvart jag ser		
59	Har du något i flaskan qvar?		
60	Du har at fordra af mitt sinne		
61	Se god dag min vän, min frände		
62	Aldrig et ord!		
63	Mäster Petrus från det helga höga		
64	Fjäriln vingad syns på Haga		A song about King Gustav III's Hagaparken. Most Swedes can sing this unaided.
65	Så ser jag ut vid stranden		

== Persons ==
The songs portray a series of persons, mostly people lapsed into heavy drinking. Named persons are Kolmodin (treasurer), Holmström, Nystedt (pub owner), Meissner (brewer), Steindecker (royal kettledrummer), Lundholm (brewer and distiller), Appelstubbe (customs officer), Österman (workshop owner), Halling (baker), Agrell (customs officer), Kämpendal, Nybom, Planberg, Joseph Israelson (student and poet) and Knapen (musician). In addition to these are the biblical figures such as Adam and Susanna; and the characters from classical mythology Bacchus and Venus, plus a few more.
