= Paul Britten Austin =

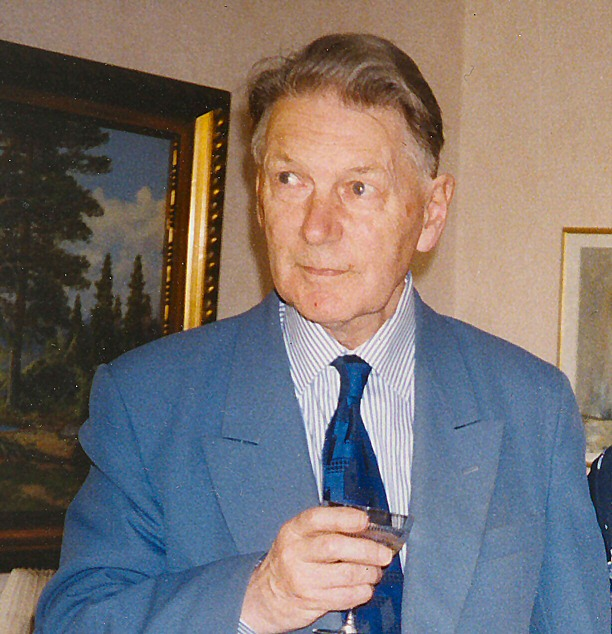
- c. 1980
- Born: 5 April 1922; Dawlish, Devon, England
- Died: 25 July 2005 (aged 83)
- Education: Winchester College
- Occupations: Translator, broadcaster, administrator, scholar of Swedish literature
- Spouse: Margareta Bergman
- Awards: North Star, Swedish Academy's Special Prize & Interpretation Prize

Detail of Cover of Paul Britten Austin's prizewinning work, The Life and Songs of Carl Michael Bellman

Paul Britten Austin (5 April 1922 – 25 July 2005) was an English author, translator, broadcaster, administrator, and scholar of Swedish literature.

He is known in particular for his translations of and books on the Swedish musician, singer and poet Carl Michael Bellman, including his prizewinning book The Life and Songs of Carl Michael Bellman. He also translated books by many other Swedish authors.

Alongside his work on Swedish literature, Austin spent 25 years assembling a trilogy of history books, 1812: Napoleon's Invasion of Russia, telling the story of Napoleon Bonaparte's failed campaign entirely through eyewitness accounts.

== Early life ==
Paul Britten Austin was born in Dawlish, South Devon, England. His parents were the writers Frederick B.A. Britten Austin and Mildred King. He was educated at Winchester College. In 1947 he married Eileen Patricia Roberts, and had one son, Derek Austin, but the marriage was short lived. In 1951, he married the novelist Margareta Bergman, sister of film director Ingmar Bergman. They lived in Stockholm, where he was head of Sveriges Radio's English-language broadcasting from 1948 to 1957. He directed the Swedish Tourist Office in London between 1957 and 1968, at the same time working on his book on Carl Michael Bellman.

== The Life and Songs of Carl Michael Bellman ==
Detail of title page

Britten Austin is best known for his work The Life and Songs of Carl Michael Bellman. It describes the life and times of Sweden's bard, the eighteenth century singer and poet Carl Michael Bellman. It was the first full biography of Bellman in any language. The Swedish Academy awarded Austin their special prize for the book, and its interpretation prize in 1979. One reason for this was that it was the first substantial work on Bellman in English (if not in any language); another is the quality of Britten Austin's writing. For example:

In 1768, the year before Oxenstierna had first heard him at Lissander's, or perhaps even a year before that, Bellman had begun to compose an entirely new sort of song. A genre which "had no model and can have no successors" (Kellgren), these songs were to grow swiftly in number until they made up the great work on which Bellman's reputation as a poet chiefly rests.
He called them Fredman's Epistles.
To understand the title it is necessary to go back twenty years. In the seventeen forties, when Carl Michael was growing up in the Lilla Daurerska Huset, the man who had been responsible for seeing to it that the finest clocks of court and city kept time was Jean Fredman—he with the penchant for wigs, lavender water and other Frenchified refinements...

— Austin

In the foreword to his life of Bellman, Britten Austin explains: "This book was born on the spur of a moment – the moment when I realised that .. there is not, and apparently never has been, a book on Bellman in English. What, the greatest of all song-writers, in any language, unknown? Such a gap in general knowledge, I felt, had to be immediately repaired; and although the draughty and unsprung carriages of British Railways, commuting on 'staggering wheel' (Note: "rullande hjul" is a phrase from Fredman's Epistle no. 80, "Liksom en herdinna".) between Victoria and Haywards Heath, are certainly not the best place to cudgel one's brain for rhymes or to elucidate eighteenth-century Swedish texts, the work was immediately put in hand."

Britten Austin argues that Bellman is unique in being a great poet, in setting all his work to music, and in being "as great on the page as when he is sung". He comments on the extreme difficulty of making poetry accessible in another language. Verse translation into the original metre is necessary, he argues, "because the virtuosity of Bellman's verse-structures, wedding his poems to their melodies, is itself the source of much of their dramatic effect." Britten Austin saw Bellman as an "infinitely loveable and brilliant genius of the Rococo, whose earthy humanity, not unlike Burns', blends so exquisitely with the graces of his artificial age." It is clear that Britten Austin admired and sought in his own way to emulate the many-talented Bellman.

Writing in Books Abroad, Britta Stendahl describes the translations of the songs in the book as "euphonious, bold, and congenial". She notes that the book provides a "thorough" overview of the Gustavian age in which the poet lived.

== 1812: Napoleon's Invasion of Russia ==
Cover of Paul Britten Austin's 25-year project, an eyewitness-only account of Napoleon's 1812 Invasion of Russia

Alongside his career and his other writings, Britten Austin spent 25 years working on his detailed three-volume eyewitness-only account of Napoleon's disastrous invasion of Russia in 1812. He explains he is "profoundly skeptical of historians." He felt "the more readable they are, the less historically reliable", so instead he chose "to invent nothing, hardly even a phrase" but instead to "resurrect them – in their own words". Britten Austin takes "160 people of the many thousands who made up the Grande Armée". "I thought, and without any impertinent comments of my own (after all I wasn't there), I might be able to reconstitute, as authentically as ever can be done, six months of vanished time." To achieve this "Naturally I have had to take my thousands of vivid fragments, longer or shorter, snip them and put them together in what I came to think of as a 'marching order', and generally help the reader not to go astray." The result is a uniquely detailed report from the front. Britten Austin used this knowledge to tell the story of a mass grave found near Vilnius in 2002.

Reviewing the book in the RUSI Journal, the military historian Charles Esdaile described it as "vivid and compelling...The most detailed account of the disaster yet to become available in English." Greenhill Books called it "a unique endeavour in military history publishing".

James Fisher describes the account as "like no other in the English language. Britten Austin has combined descriptive prose with quotes from primary sources to produce a readable account. It is similar to the approach that was used by French historians such as Lachouque, Hourtoulle and Houssaye."

== Translation ==
Britten Austin translated several books from Swedish to English. He also translated some of Evert Taube's songs, a selection of which can be found in the singer's autobiography. Some have been recorded by Roger Whittaker, Scafell Pike, Sven-Bertil Taube and Martin Best.

== Works ==
=== Books ===
- 1956: The Charm of Sweden (with Anthony Downman and Lorna Downman).
- 1960: Round the Swedish Year (with Lorna Downman).
- 1966: The Viking Gods.
- 1967: The Life and Songs of Carl Michael Bellman, Genius of the Swedish Rococo. Allhem, Malmö; American-Scandinavian Foundation, New York.
- 1968: On Being Swedish: Reflections Towards a Better Understanding of the Swedish Character.
- 1969: Sweden (Holiday Guides)
- 1970: The Swedes: How They Live and Work.
- 1979: Days in Sweden.
- 1981: The Organ Maker's Wife, (a novel).
- 1986: Gustaf Fröding: His Life and Poetry.
- 1999: Famous Swedes.
- 2000: 1812: Napoleon's Invasion of Russia. Greenhill Books. (Originally published in three volumes: The March on Moscow, Napoleon in Moscow, The Great Retreat.)
- 2002: 1815: The Return of Napoleon: Bonaparte's March Back to Power, Greenhill. (also Frontline Books, 2015)

=== Translations ===
- 1973: The Locked Room, by Sjöwall and Wahlöö (Original title: Det slutna rummet). Pantheon Books.
- 1967: Autobiography of Evert Taube, I Come From a Raging Sea (Original title: Jag kommer av ett brusand' hav). Peter Owen Publishers.
- 1973: Bergman on Bergman: Interviews with Ingmar Bergman, By Stig Björkman, Torsten Manns, and Jonas Sima. Simon & Schuster.
- 1999: Fredman's Epistles & Songs. A Selection in English with a Short Introduction, by Carl Michael Bellman. Proprius / UNESCO.
- 2003: Doctor Glas, by Hjalmar Söderberg. Little, Brown and Co., 1963. Reissued with introduction by Margaret Atwood, Harvill.
- 2005: A History of the Swedish People, by Vilhelm Moberg. Two volumes. University of Minnesota Press.
