= Pastorale =

Musical genre

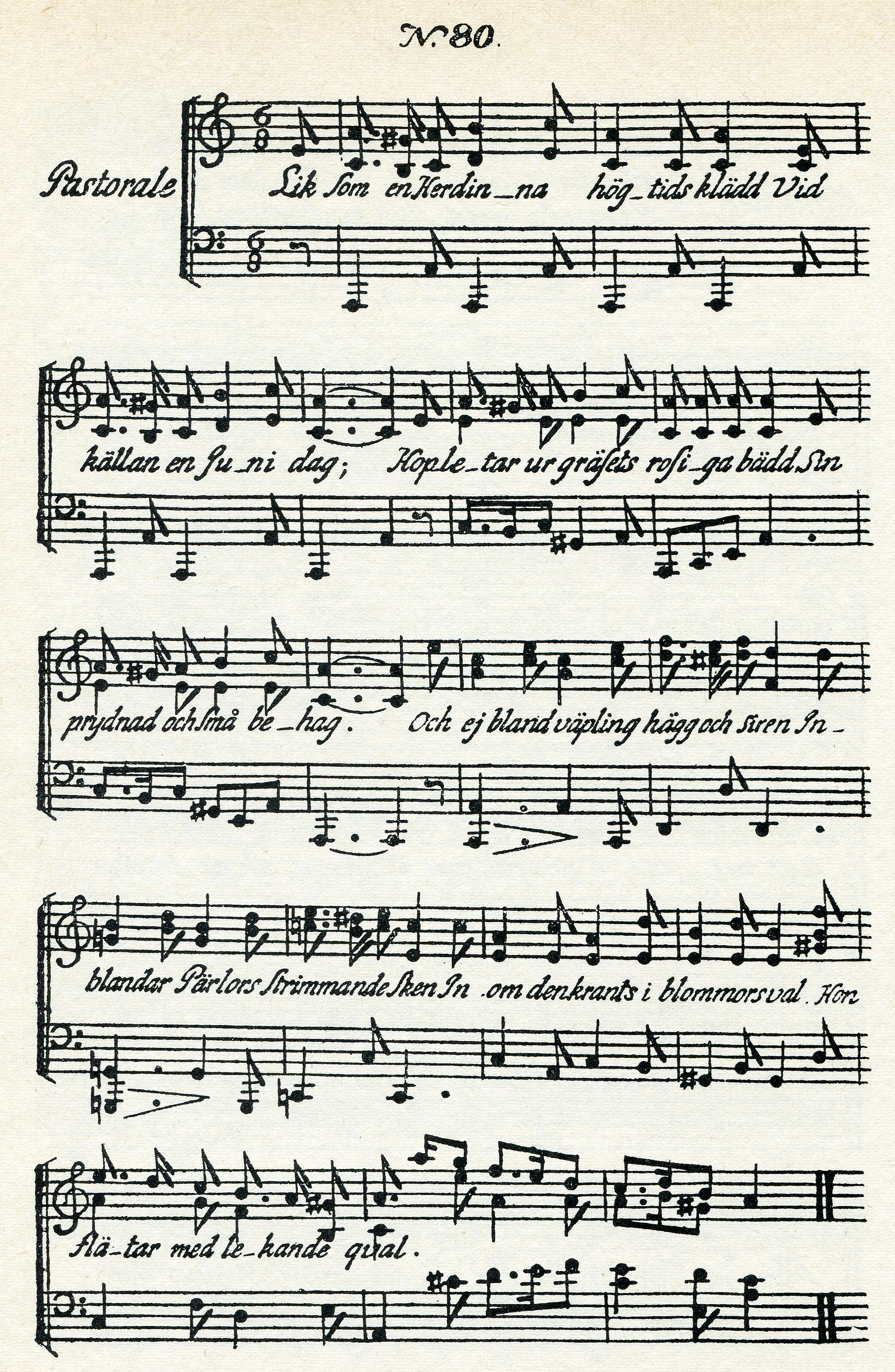
Sheet music for Carl Michael Bellman's Fredman's Epistle 80, Liksom en Herdinna, högtids klädd, one of several pastorales in the 1790 collection

Pastorale refers to something of a pastoral nature in music, whether in form or in mood.

In Baroque music, a pastorale is a movement of a melody in thirds over a drone bass, recalling the Christmas music of pifferari, players of the traditional Italian bagpipe and reed pipe. Pastorales are generally in 6/8 or 9/8 or 12/8 metre, at a moderate tempo.

Common examples include the last movement of Corelli's Christmas Concerto (Op.6, No.8), the third movement of Vivaldi's Spring concerto from The Four Seasons, the Pifa movement of Handel's Messiah, the first movements of Bach's Pastorale (BWV 590) for organ, and the Sinfonia that opens part II of his Christmas Oratorio as an introduction to the angelic announcement to the shepherds. Scarlatti wrote some examples in his keyboard sonatas, and many other composers in the transition between the baroque and classical eras, particularly French (Marc-Antoine Charpentier, 8 sets, H.479, H.482, H.483, H.484, H.485, H.486, H.492, H.493), used this technique. Rossini famously included a Pastorale section in his William Tell Overture. The Italian pastorale Tu scendi dalle stelle is a widely popular Christmas carol by St. Alfonso Liguori, and Pietro Yon's Gesù bambino is another.

The Swedish poet and performer Carl Michael Bellman's song collection Fredman's Epistles contain several pastorales, including Liksom en Herdinna, högtids klädd (Like a Shepherdess, Solemnly Dressed), which begins with a near-paraphrase of the start of Nicolas Boileau-Despréaux's French guide to the construction of pastoral verse.
