= Lasse Johansson =

Lasse Johansson may refer to:

- Lucidor (1638–1674), Swedish baroque poet
- Lasse Johansson (footballer) (born 1975), Swedish footballer
- Lars-Olof Johansson (born 1973), guitarist with The Cardigans
