= Ge rum i Bröllopsgåln din hund! =

Song by the 18th century Swedish bard Carl Michael Bellman

- Art song
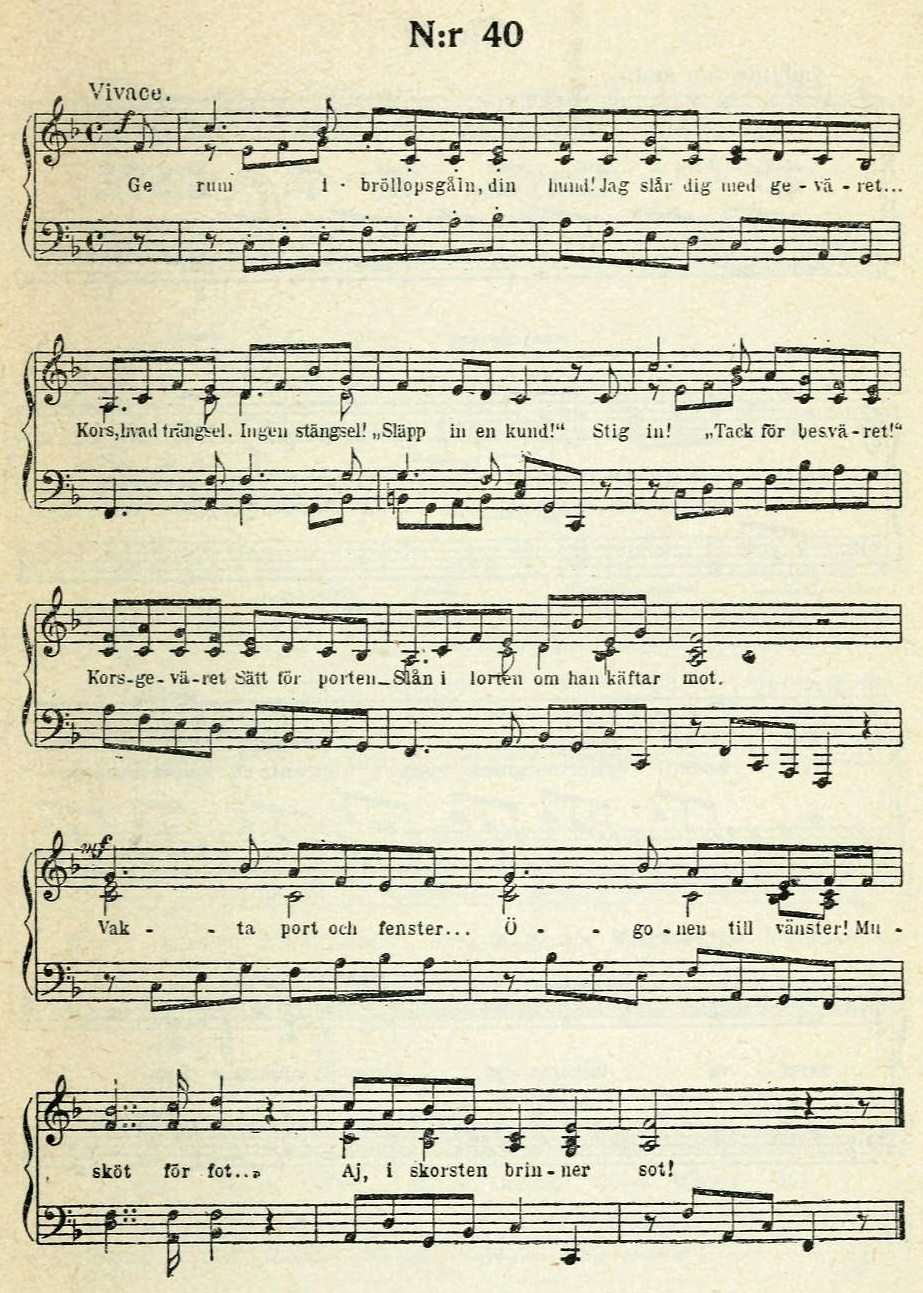
- First page of sheet music, here in the 1920 Bonniers edition
- English: Make room in the Wedding reception you dog!
- Written: 10 October 1771
- Text: poem by Carl Michael Bellman
- Language: Swedish
- Melody: Unknown origin
- Published: 1790 in Fredman's Epistles
- Scoring: voice and cittern

Ge rum i Bröllopsgåln din hund! (Make room in the Wedding reception you dog!) is Epistle No. 40 in the Swedish poet and performer Carl Michael Bellman's 1790 song collection, Fredman's Epistles. One of his best-known works, it describes an utterly chaotic wedding at a venue where soldiers mix up with musicians and the wedding-party; the chimney catches fire, and even the priest robs the collection. The verse-pattern and elaborate rhyming scheme combine to assist the feeling of chaos.

The epistle is subtitled "Angående Bröllopet hos Bensvarfvars" (Concerning the Wedding at Bensvarvars); the song is sometimes known under this name. James Massengale calls it "one of the wildest weddings in Swedish literature". The composition has been contrasted with the wedding at Cana, part of Bellman's use of Biblical allusions for comic effect.

== Context ==
Carl Michael Bellman is a central figure in the Swedish ballad tradition and a powerful influence in Swedish music, known for his 1790 Fredman's Epistles and his 1791 Fredman's Songs. A solo entertainer, he played the cittern, accompanying himself as he performed his songs at the royal court.

Jean Fredman (1712 or 1713–1767) was a real watchmaker of Bellman's Stockholm. The fictional Fredman, alive after 1767, but without employment, is the supposed narrator in Bellman's epistles and songs. The epistles, written and performed in different styles, from drinking songs and laments to pastorales, paint a complex picture of the life of the city during the 18th century. A frequent theme is the demimonde, with Fredman's cheerfully drunk Order of Bacchus, a loose company of ragged men who favour strong drink and prostitutes. At the same time as depicting this realist side of life, Bellman creates a rococo picture, full of classical allusion, following the French post-Baroque poets. The women, including the beautiful Ulla Winblad, are "nymphs", while Neptune's festive troop of followers and sea-creatures sport in Stockholm's waters. The juxtaposition of elegant and low life is humorous, sometimes burlesque, but always graceful and sympathetic. The songs are "most ingeniously" set to their music, which is nearly always borrowed and skilfully adapted.

== Song ==
=== Music and verse form ===
Melody of Epistle 40
Epistle 40's lively melody of unidentified origin

The song has 9 verses, each consisting of 14 lines. The verses have a complex pattern of stresses and rhyming pattern, ABCCABBDDEFFEE, contributing to the humorously chaotic effect. The music is in 4/4 time, and is marked Vivace. The Epistle is dated 10 October 1771. The source of the melody has not been identified.

=== Lyrics ===
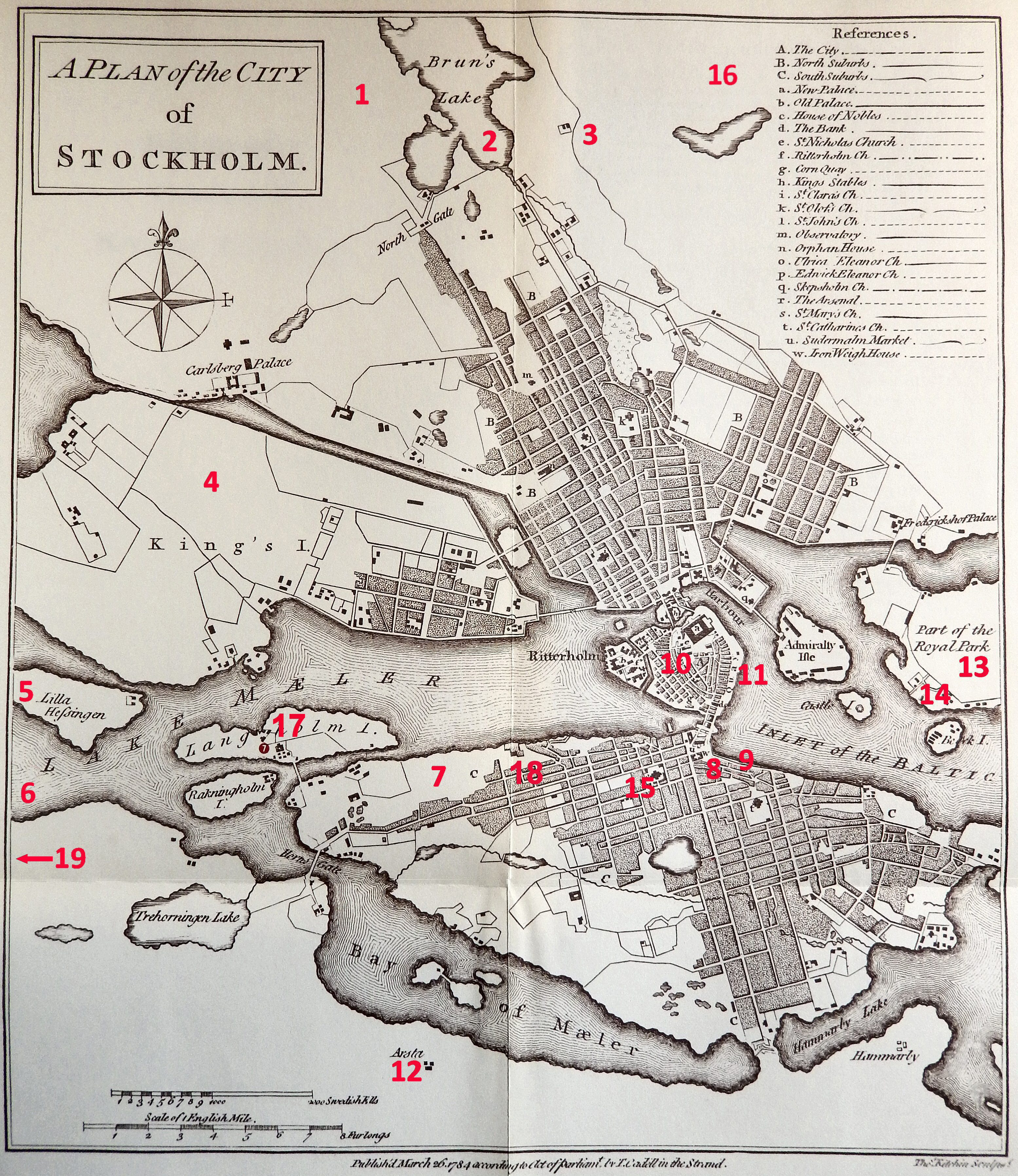
Map of Bellman's Stockholm, places of interest for his Fredman's Epistles and Songs on map from William Coxe's Travels into Poland, Russia, Sweden, and Denmark, 1784. 1 Haga park (S. 64) – 2 Brunnsviken – 3 Första Torpet (Ep. 80) – 4 Kungsholmen – 5 Hessingen (Ep. 48) – 6 Lake Mälaren (Ep. 48) – 7 Södermalm – 8 Urvädersgränd – 9 Lokatten tavern (Ep. 11, Ep. 59, Ep. 77), Bruna Dörren tavern (Ep. 24, Ep. 38) – 10 Gamla stan (Ep. 5, Ep. 9, Ep. 23, Ep. 28, Ep. 79) – 11 Skeppsbron Quay (Ep. 33) – 12 Årsta Castle – 13 Djurgården Park – (Ep. 25, Ep. 51, Ep. 82) – 14 Gröna Lund (Ep. 12, Ep. 62) – 15 Bellman's birthplace – 16 Fiskartorpet (Ep. 71) – 17 Lilla Sjötullen (Bellmanmuseet) (Ep. 48) – 18 Bensvarvars tavern (Ep. 40) 19 Rostock tavern (Ep. 45)

The song, subtitled "Angående Bröllopet hos Bensvarfvars" (Concerning the Wedding at Bensvarvars), describes an utterly chaotic wedding at the Bensvarfvars tavern on Hornskroken street in the Södermalm island district of Stockholm. Soldiers are mixed up with musicians and the wedding-party; everybody talks at once, often angrily; an officer shouts drill commands to the soldiers. Meanwhile, the chimney catches fire; the preacher gives a fire-and-brimstone sermon on St. Paul, David, Saul, and original sin; music plays; soldiers drink; the bride's white gloves split; the bridegroom swears and bursts into tears; a bridesmaid curtsies; and the preacher collapses in a corner. At the end, a brawl breaks out; a Corporal punches everyone he can reach; the bridegroom gets lascivious; some of those present, including the priest, rob the collection meant for the Seraphim Hospital; and the party breaks up in disorder.

The start of epistle 40, "Concerning the Wedding at Bensvarvars"
Carl Michael Bellman, 1790

Ge rum i Bröllops-gåln din hund!
Jag slår dig med geväret.
Kors hvad trängsel!
Ingen stängsel!
Släpp in en kund.
Stig in. – Tack för besväret.
Korsgeväret
Sätt för porten;
Slån i lorten,
Om han käftar mot.
Vakta port och fenster.
Ögonen til vänster!
Musköt för fot!
Aj i skorsten brinner sot!

Prose translation

Make way in the wedding-hall you dog!
I'll hit you with my gun.
Gosh what a crush!
No fighting!
Let a customer in.
Come in. – Thanks for the trouble.
Port ... arms!
Close the door;
Hit the bloke,
If he answers back.
Guard door and windows.
Eyes ... left!
Order ... arms!
Oh, the chimney's on fire!

Image

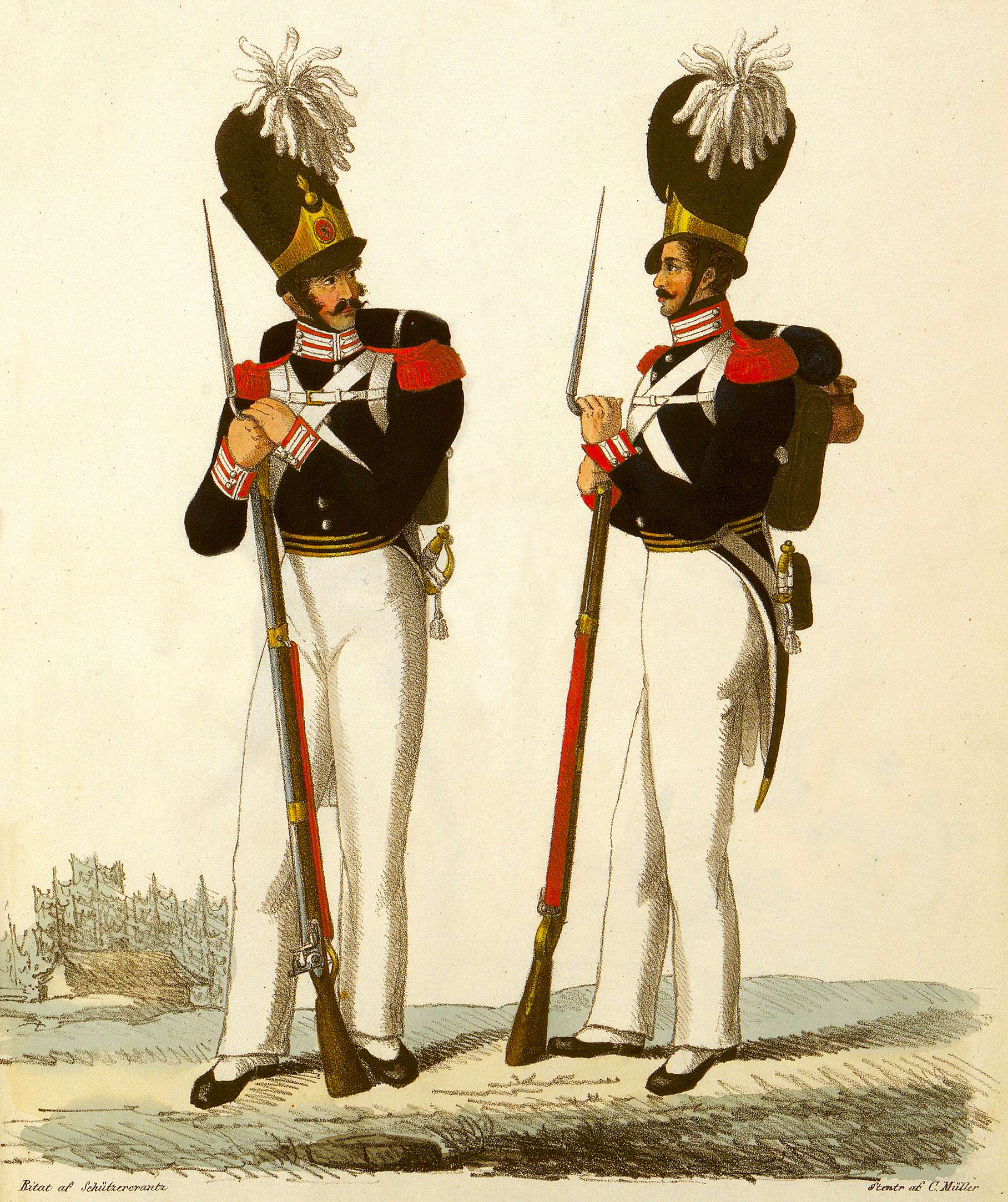

Swedish soldiers with muskets.
1825 illustration

== Reception and legacy ==
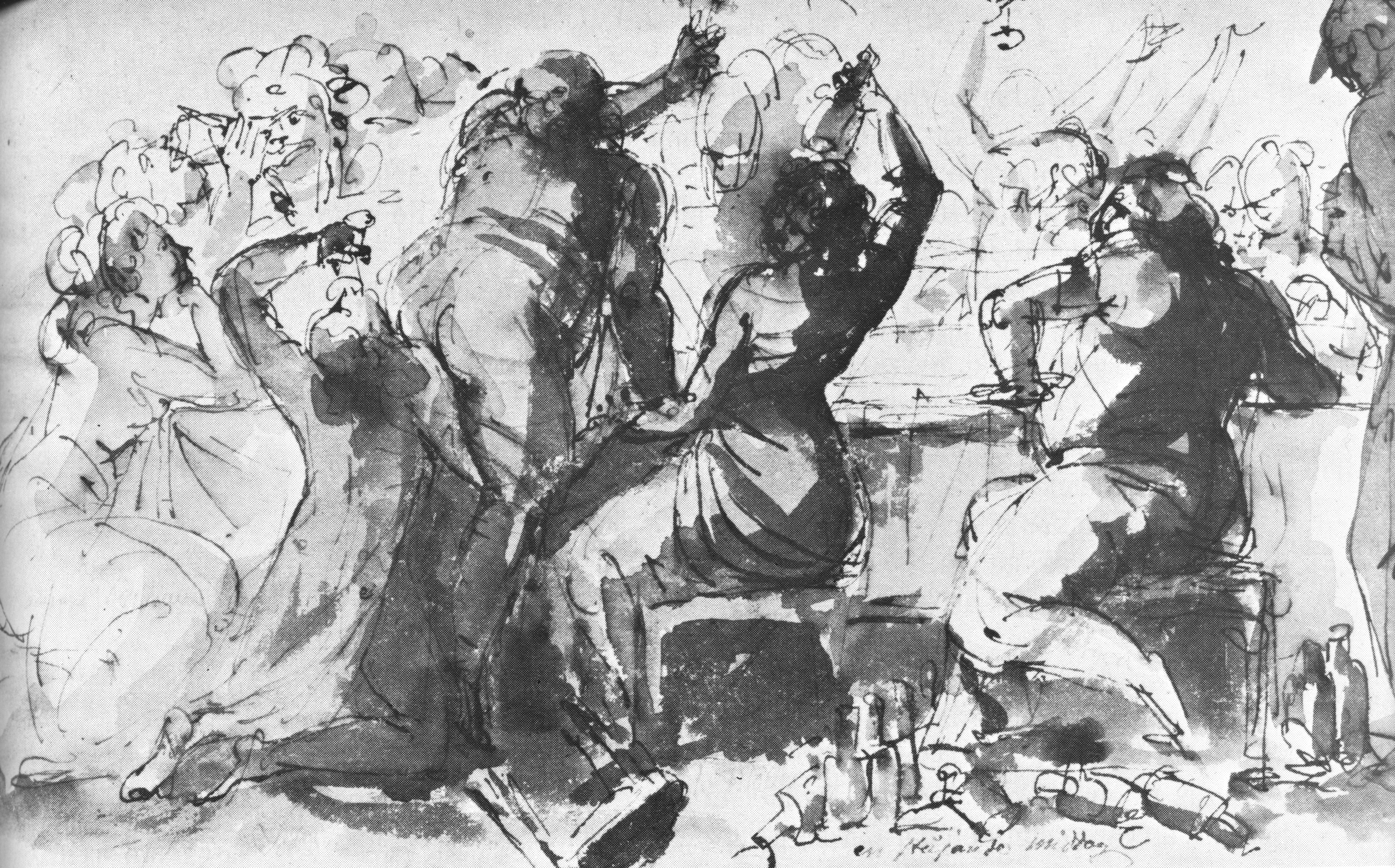
"A noisy company" in Bellman's Stockholm. Wash drawing by Johan Tobias Sergel (1740–1814)

The Epistle is described by the musicologist James Massengale as "of one of the wildest weddings in Swedish literature". He comments that the rhyming pattern effectively hides some of the rhymes, making the descriptive poem imitate prose. Firstly, Bellman does not rhyme the first two lines until lines 5 and 6, when the verse is well under way. Next, he ignores the fact that the music repeats from bar 5, but creates new rhymes and divisions in lines 5–10. To break up the order still further, Bellman interjects short sharp commands, with "Stig in!" (Come in!) at the start of line 6 of the first verse, "Håll" (Halt!) at the start of line 11 in the second verse, "Alarm!" at the start, "Skyldra" (Shoulder arms!) in line 13 of verse 3, and "Gevär!" (Arms!) at the beginning of verse 4. Massengale observes that these syntactic breaks destroy the listener's sense of position in the rhyming scheme, the uncertainty of the rhyme creating a feeling of the tumult of the chaotic wedding celebrations.

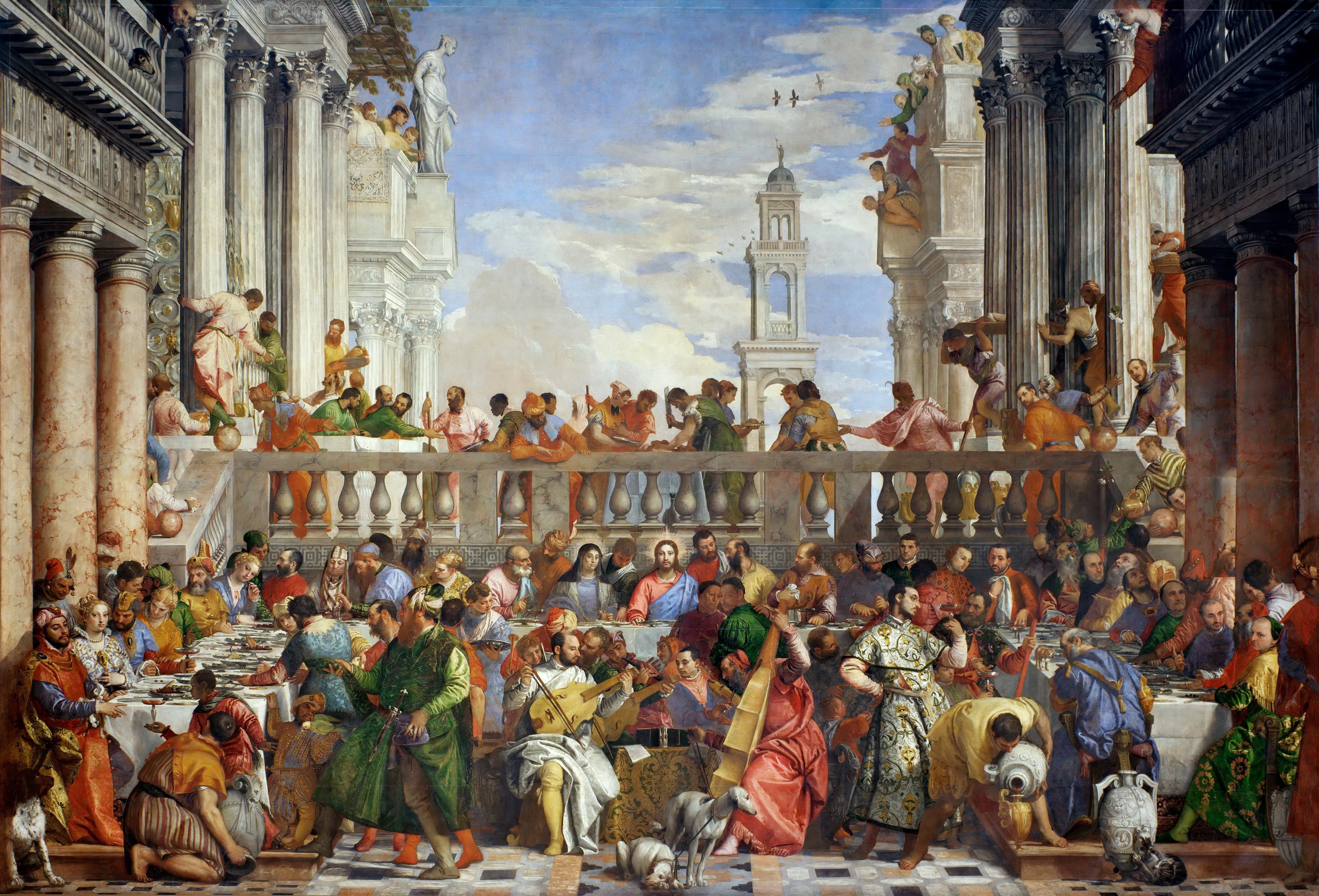
The wedding at Bensvarvars has been contrasted with the Biblical wedding at Cana, with Bellman in a "dialectic between the religious and the Bacchanalian". Painting of The Wedding at Cana by Paolo Veronese, 1562–3

The scholar of literature Lars Lönnroth comments that we hear a crowd of heated wedding-guests shouting at one another in a "crazy comic furioso" in which it is impossible to discern who is saying what. What Fredman himself may be saying is also unclear, so that the whole thing, he writes, is a farce from beginning to end.

The critic Bo Nordstrand notes that Lönnroth draws a parallel between the Biblical wedding at Cana in Galilee and the epistle's wedding at Bensvarvars, and agrees that there is a "dialectic between the religious and the Bacchanalian". Like his contemporaries, Bellman wrote drinking songs that parody preaching and quote from the Bible and the book of Psalms, with Fredman as the opposite of a preacher; and he treats a wide range of ceremonies from weddings, baptisms, funerals, balls, society chapter rituals, and trials to military parades with parody and burlesque. Lönnroth states that a frequent pattern in the Epistles is for a serious ceremony gradually to disintegrate into pure farce. He notes for instance that this is seen not only in Epistle 40's descent into a brawl and wild rioting but also in Epistle 54, "Never an Iris": at the end of a sad and solemn funeral "at Corporal Boman's grave in St Katrina churchyard", Fredman "tactlessly" advises the widow to "choose a new Corporal [by sitting] on a folding bench [with another man]".

The Bellman Society wrote of the composition that "The catastrophic wedding at Bensvarvars, a pub in Södermalm, is a tumult that is developed at breakneck tempo. It starts with a chimney fire and ends with a resounding brawl where the officiating priest helps himself to the collection for a hospital."

Göran Hassler states in his annotated selection of Bellman's work that the Epistle has been recorded in interestingly different interpretations by Sven-Bertil Taube on his 1963 album Carl Michael Bellman, Volume 2 (His Master's Voice), and by Cornelis Vreeswijk on his 1971 album Spring mot Ulla, spring! Cornelis sjunger Bellman (Philips). The Epistle has been translated into German.

== Sources ==
- Bellman, Carl Michael (1790). Fredmans epistlar. Stockholm: By Royal Privilege.
- Britten Austin, Paul (1967). The Life and Songs of Carl Michael Bellman: Genius of the Swedish Rococo. New York: Allhem, Malmö American-Scandinavian Foundation. ISBN 978-3-932759-00-0.
- Hassler, Göran; Dahl, Peter (illus.) (1989). Bellman – en antologi [Bellman – an anthology]. En bok för alla. ISBN 91-7448-742-6. (contains the most popular Epistles and Songs, in Swedish, with sheet music)
- Kleveland, Åse; Ehrén, Svenolov (illus.) (1984). Fredmans epistlar & sånger [The songs and epistles of Fredman]. Stockholm: Informationsförlaget. ISBN 91-7736-059-1. (with facsimiles of sheet music from first editions in 1790, 1791)
- Lönnroth, Lars (2005). Ljuva karneval! : om Carl Michael Bellmans diktning [Lovely Carnival! : about Carl Michael Bellman's Verse]. Stockholm: Albert Bonniers Förlag. ISBN 978-91-0-057245-7. OCLC 61881374.
- Massengale, James Rhea (1979). The Musical-Poetic Method of Carl Michael Bellman. Stockholm: Almqvist & Wiksell International. ISBN 91-554-0849-4.
