= Martin Bagge =

Swedish composer

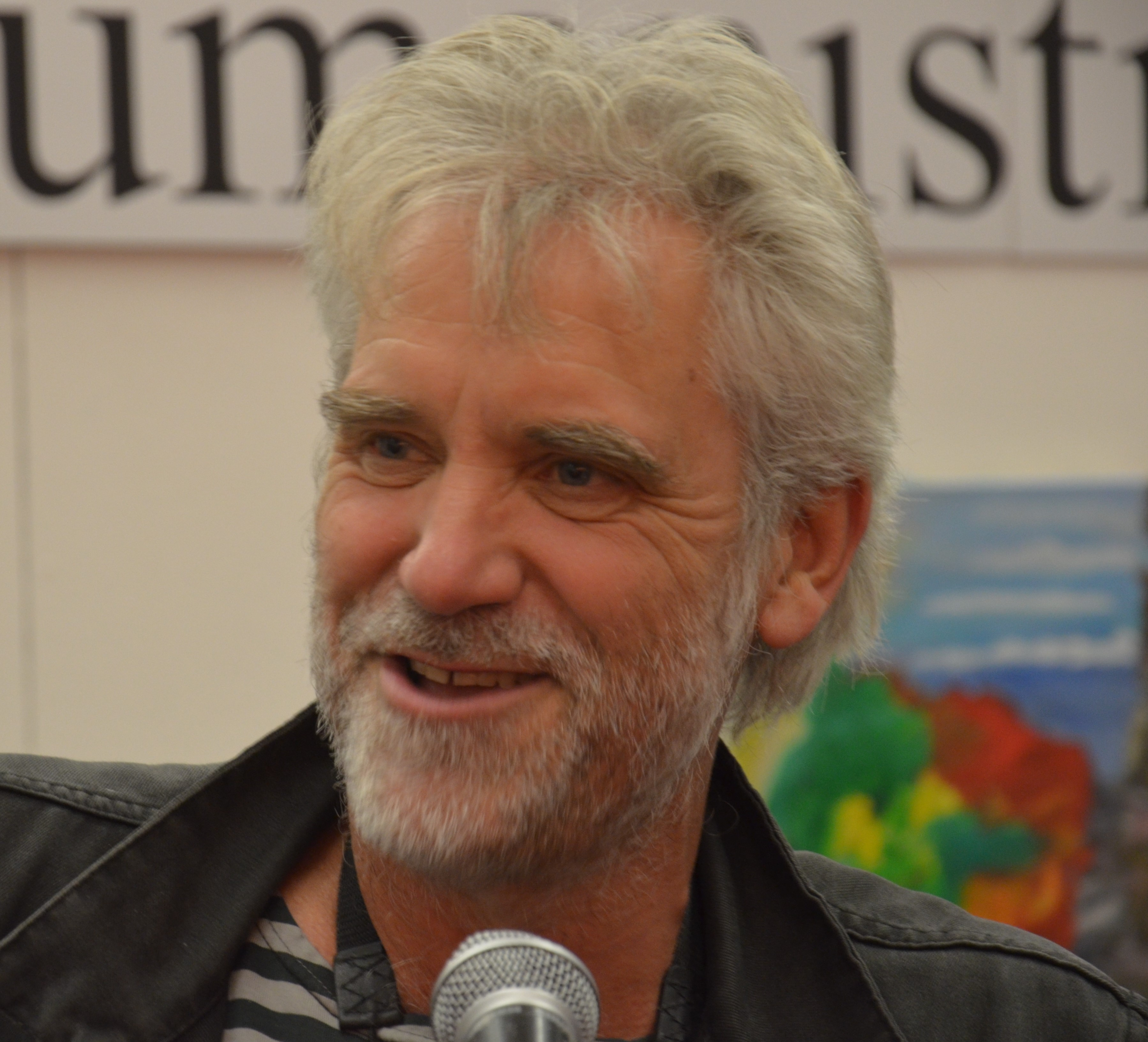
- in 2014
- Born: 29 November 1958; Mölnlycke, Sweden
- Occupation: Musician
- Known for: interpreting Carl Michael Bellman

Martin Bagge (born 29 November 1958) is a Swedish musician and composer known for his interpretations of Carl Michael Bellman's songs.

== Biography ==
Martin Bagge was educated at the Academy of Music at the University of Gothenburg. As a songwriter, he specializes in older Swedish songwriters such as Carl Michael Bellman, Olof von Dalin, and Lasse Lucidor, but he has also set to music lyrics by writers such as Harry Martinson and Elisabet Hermodsson. He also performs Bellman songs abroad, for example in Germany and Denmark. As a choral composer, he has attracted attention for his settings of poems by Federico García Lorca and Ebba Lindqvist.

His recordings include many of Carl Michael Bellman's 1790 Fredman's Epistles and 1791 Fredman's Songs, such as "Glimmande nymf", "Ack, du min moder", "Vila vid denna källa", and "Fjäriln vingad syns på Haga". Like Bellman, he plays a cittern. His approach, in the opinion of Ingrid Strömdahl, writing in Svenska Dagbladet, is respectful of the poetry and of Bellman's sharp observation of human nature, the environment, and unusual ways of being; he interprets the work "with heart and soul".

Together with the literary scholar David Anthin, he has during the summers of 2015, 2017-2019 carried out four sailing trips on the cruiser Flory on Sweden's west coast, and performed songs by Evert Taube on beach trips, and as lunchtime theatre in Gothenburg, in a program called "Cruising with Taube".

Martin Bagge has collaborated with musicians including Alf Hambe, Lars Jansson, Lars Danielsson, Dan Berglund and Cajsa Román.

== Prizes and distinctions ==
- 2001 – Member of Swedish Song Academy
- 2001 – Sten A. Olsson Culture Stipend
- 2001 – Hambe Stipend
- 2009 – Swedish Song Prize
- 2019 – Honorary doctorate at the University of Gothenburg

== Discography ==
- 1984 – Så drivs vi
- 1986 – Till ett barn, en vind, ett träd
- 1989 – Kärlek och Bacchus
- 1992 – Om sommaren
- 1993 – Blåsen nu alla
- 1995–97 – Fredmans Epistlar och Sånger
- 1997 – Kom fria sinnen hit
- 1998 – Martin Bagge gör Carl Michael Bellman levande: 'Upptåger' från ungdomsåren
- 1999 – Till Isagel
- 2000 – Till Undrans land
- 2001 – Fredmans Epistlar och Sånger
- 2002 – Fredmans Episteln und Gesänge
- 2002 – Fredman's Epistles and Songs
- 2005 – Wärldslige och Andelige Sånger
- 2007 – ...vid denna strand, vid detta hav, vid detta vatten
- 2012 – Ack, libertas! – wisor av Lars Wivallius
- 2014 – Vägen ut (with Trio Isagel)
