= Lucidor =

Swedish baroque poet

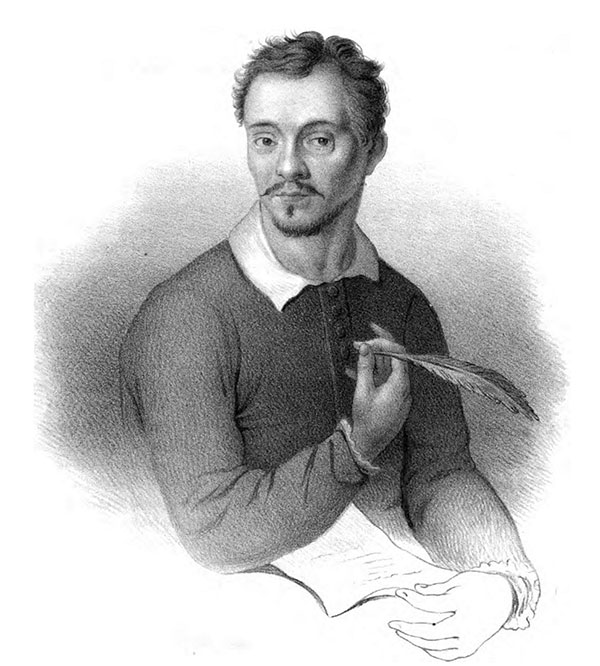
Lasse Lucidor as imagined in 1849.

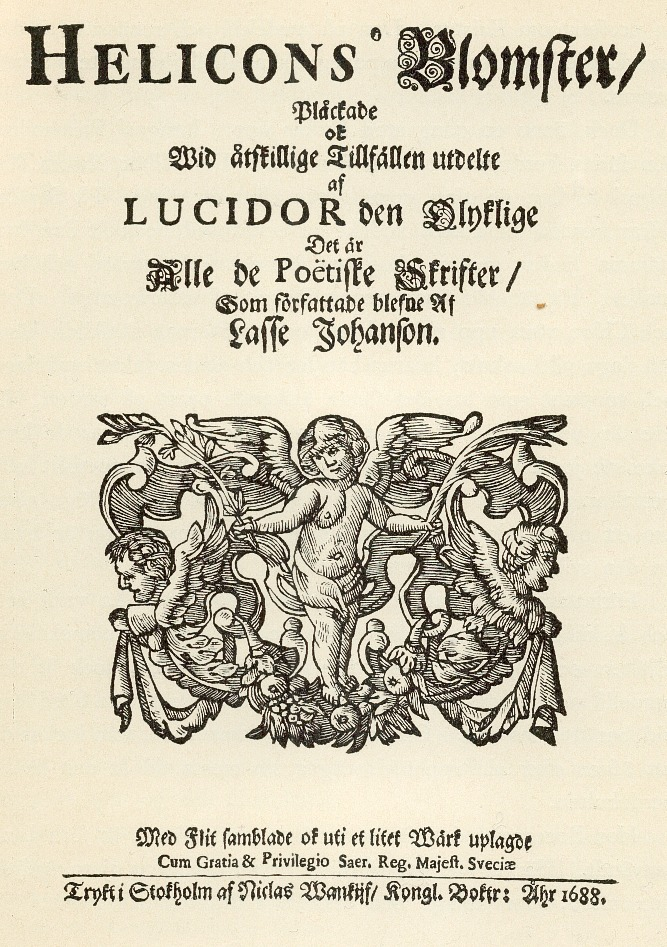
The front page of "Helicons blomster", the posthumous collection of poems by the poet Lucidor, published in 1688.

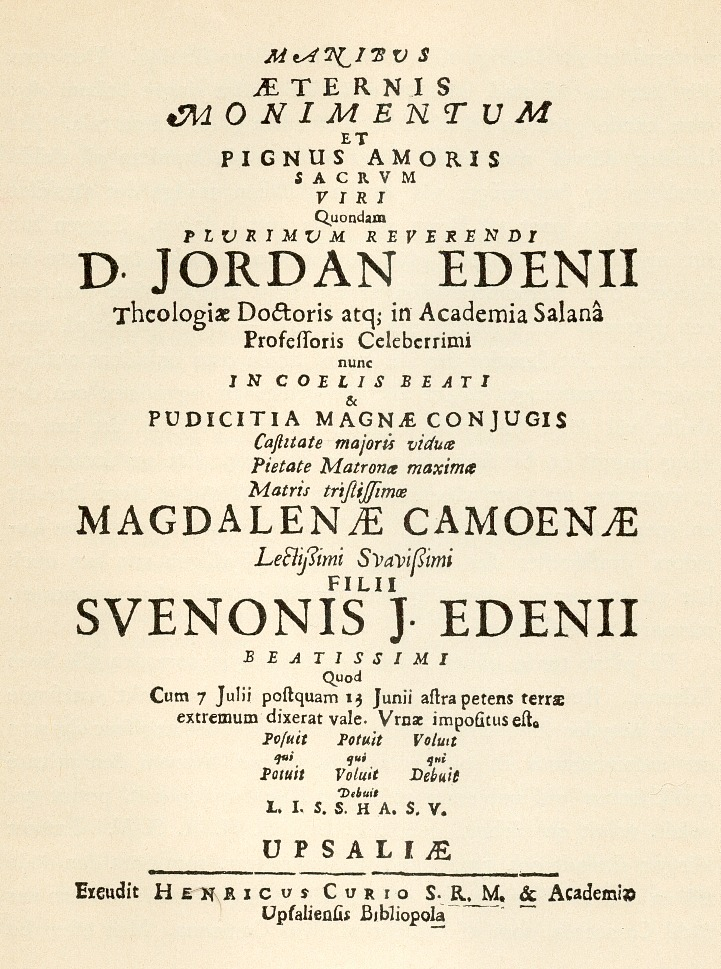
Front page of funeral poem for the young boy Sven Edenius.

Lars "Lasse" Johansson (1638 – August 13, 1674), usually referred to under his pseudonym Lucidor (pronounced [ˈlʉ̌ːsɪdɔr]), was a Swedish baroque poet. He is remembered for his burlesque poetry that is seen as foreshadowing that of Johan Runius and, especially, Carl Michael Bellman, and for his dramatic death in a tumultuous brawl at the Fimmelstången tavern in Gamla stan in Stockholm. Lasse Johansson wrote under several different pseudonyms, but of these Lucidor (or Lucidor den olycklige, "Lucidor the Unfortunate", as he called himself on occasion) is the one under which he is commonly known today. (Note: The hybrid form Lasse Lucidor, which is sometimes seen, as in Nils Ferlin's poem På källaren Fimmelstången, seems not to be attested from his own time.)

== Life ==
Lars Johansson was born in Stockholm. His father was a naval officer and his grandfather was admiral Lars Strusshielm, who was appointed head of a Swedish naval shipyard in Pomerania in 1638. A few years later, Strusshielm's daughter and son-in-law followed him to Pomerania, where Lars Johansson and his four siblings grew up. Both parents were dead by 1650, and the grandfather died in 1653. Lasse spent four years, from 1655 to 1659 at the university of Greifswald and from early 1659 at the university in Leipzig, where he was expelled just before Christmas 1659, after a brawl with the town guards. His biography during the following years is unclear, but he travelled to France, possibly as a tutor, and is said to have lived in poverty in Stockholm. He may have spent time with a travelling group of comedians, and is reported to have returned to Stockholm with these in 1668. During the winter 1668–69, he was enrolled as a student in Uppsala, but appeared to have spent his time there as a language tutor for students; an appointment as a teacher of modern languages fell through.

A significant part of his modest income appears to have come from writing occasional poetry for weddings and burials. One piece brought him in trouble: Giliare Kwaal ("A suitor's sufferings"), a poem for the wedding in November 1669 of the powerful nobleman Conrad Gyllenstierna to Märta Christina Ulfsparre. Lucidor had previously written a well-received poem for the wedding of Conrad's brother, Christoffer Gyllenstierna. Giliare Kwaal, however, was received as libel by Conrad Gyllenstierna, who reported the author to the Svea hovrätt, the appeal court. The poet was arrested and spent several months in prison until the process was finally at an end in the summer of 1670. Neither the town court in Stockholm nor the appeal court found the poem libellous, but the sentence still warned the poet to "use his pencil more carefully hereafter". Lucidor scholar Stina Hansson explains the problems with the poem in that the author did not follow the conventions by which motifs were conventional for an addressee of a particular social standing, and had broken the rules by using a style more suitable for occasional poetry in a bourgeois setting. After his run-in with the Gyllenstierna, Lucidor became much more careful in exactly following the conventions in this respect. Lucidor's best remembered poem, the ballad Skulle Jag sörja då wore Jag tokot ("If I would mourn, I would be crazy") is traditionally said to have been written during his time in prison.

Lucidor was killed in a bar brawl-turned-duel with a Lieutenant Arvid Christian Storm.

== Work ==
Three of Lucidor's religious songs were published in 1685 under the name Lucida intervalla, edited by Haquin Spegel. These remained part of the hymn book of the Church of Sweden into the 20th century. In 1689, Johan Andersin, an accountant who had been a friend of Lucidor, published a collection of his poetry with the title Helicons blomster/ plåckade ok wid åtskillige tillfällen utdelte af Lucidor den olycklige, subtitled det är alle de poëtiske skrifter som författade blefue af Lasse Johanson ('Flowers of Helicon/ plucked and at several occasions handed out by Lucidor the Unfortunate' and 'That is, all the poetic writings that were composed by Lasse Johanson', respectively). Helicons blomster was republished in 1835, and a new collection including some additional poems was published in 1865. Modern editions have been published by Fredrik sandwall in 1914–30 and by Stina Hansson in 1997.

Lucidor was not highly appreciated in the 18th century, but Carl Michael Bellman is known to have been familiar with Lucidor and refers to him and Runius together in one of his Epistles of Fredman (No. 24):

Jag skull' supa om ni tror,
Liksom Runius, Lucidor.

("I will certainly drink,
like Runius, Lucidor.")

The interest in Lucidor was re-awakened in the romantic period. The main authors influencing the image of Lucidor were Per Daniel Amadeus Atterbom, Oscar Levertin and (in the early 20th century) Erik Axel Karlfeldt. In the late 20th century, Lucidor has been the topic of a novel by Torbjörn Säfve.

The musicologist and musician Martin Bagge (who is also known as an interpreter of the works of Bellman) has published a collection of Lucidor's poems with musical annotation, and a CD recording them. It has been known that many of Lucidor's poems were written to be sung but no melodies have been preserved. Assuming that Lucidor borrowed melodies popular in his time (as many other poets of the time, and later Bellman, did), Bagge has attempted to reconstruct the music by matching the metrics with hymns and other songs with which the poet would have been familiar.
