= Ack du min moder =

Song by the 18th century Swedish bard Carl Michael Bellman

- Art song
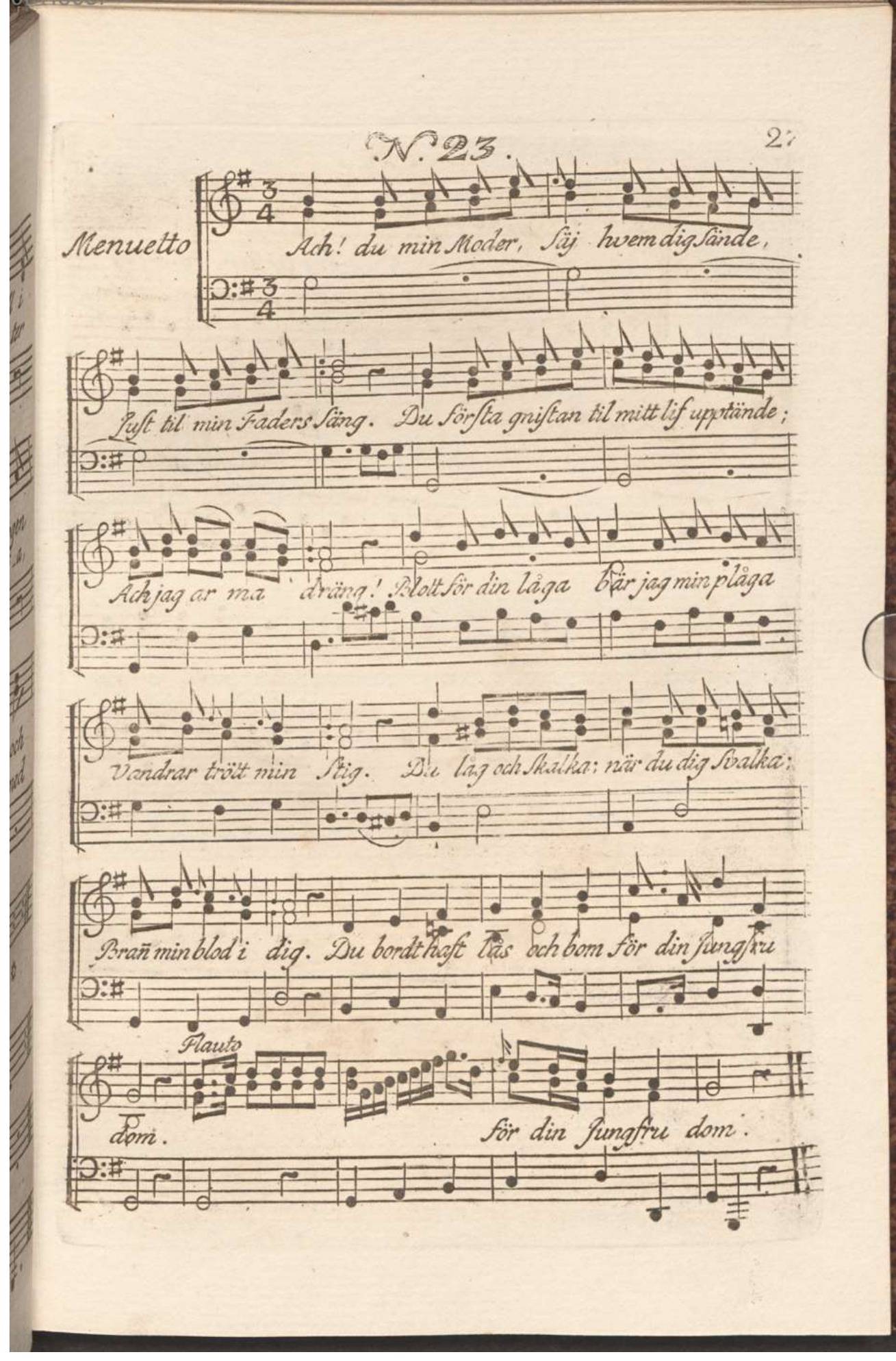
- Sheet music for Fredman's Epistle No. 23, "Ack du min moder" (Alas, thou my mother). To a graceful minuet tune, Fredman, lying drunk in the gutter outside the Crawl-in Tavern, "a summer night in the year 1768", blames his mother for his conception; but a morning visit to the tavern revives his spirits. 1810 reprint of 1790 first edition.
- English: Alas, thou my mother
- Written: 1770
- Text: poem by Carl Michael Bellman
- Language: Swedish
- Melody: Unknown origin
- Published: 1790 in Fredman's Epistles
- Scoring: voice, cittern, and flute

Ack du min moder (Alas, thou my mother), originally written Ach! du min Moder, is one of the Swedish poet and performer Carl Michael Bellman's best-known and best-loved songs, from his 1790 collection, Fredman's Epistles, where it is No. 23. The collection is ostensibly of drinking-songs, but they vary in character from laments to pastorales, often simultaneously realistic and elegantly rococo in style. The song has two parts, despairing and celebratory: it begins as a lament, with Jean Fredman lying drunk in a Stockholm gutter outside the Crawl-in tavern, and repeatedly cursing his mother for conceiving him. Then he goes in, is revived by a stiff drink, and repeatedly thanks his mother and father for his life.

The epistle is subtitled Som är et Soliloquium då Fredman låg vid krogen Kryp-In, gent emot Bancohuset, en sommarnatt år 1768 (A soliloquy in which Fredman lay outside the Crawl-in Tavern, right by the Bank, one summer night in the year 1768). The epistle's "soliloquy" was described by the critic Oscar Levertin as "the to-be-or-not-to-be of Swedish literature". Fredman was a real character, a watchmaker, but in Bellman's depiction he is an unemployed drunkard.

The song's themes include burlesque and social realism. It has strong biblical echoes from the books of Job and Jeremiah, and from the Psalms, reflecting a Lutheran background. The song touches on the philosophical debate about whether children are like their fathers or take after both parents.

== Context ==
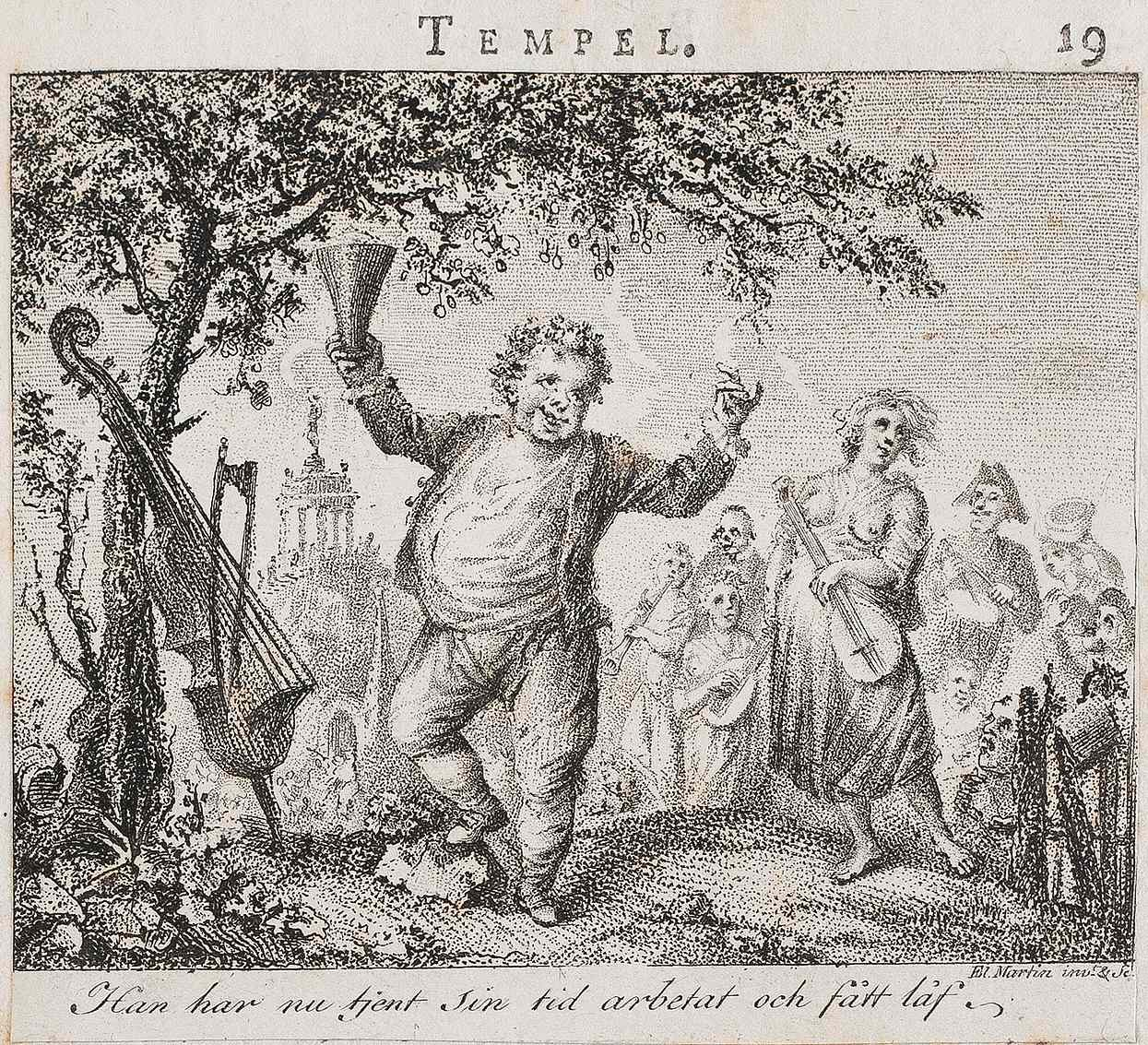
Drunken celebrations in classical style by the "Order of Bacchus". Illustration by Elias Martin in Bellman's 1783 Bacchi Tempel.

Carl Michael Bellman is a central figure in the Swedish ballad tradition and a powerful influence in Swedish music, known for his 1790 Fredman's Epistles and his 1791 Fredman's Songs. A solo entertainer, he played the cittern, accompanying himself as he performed his songs at the royal court.

Jean Fredman (1712 or 1713–1767) was a real watchmaker of Bellman's Stockholm. The fictional Fredman, alive after 1767, but without employment, is the supposed narrator in Bellman's epistles and songs. The epistles, written and performed in different styles, from drinking songs and laments to pastorales, paint a complex picture of the life of the city during the 18th century. A frequent theme is the demimonde, with Fredman's cheerfully drunk Order of Bacchus, a loose company of ragged men who favour strong drink and prostitutes. At the same time as depicting this realist side of life, Bellman creates a rococo picture, full of classical allusion, following the French post-Baroque poets. The women, including the beautiful Ulla Winblad, are "nymphs", while Neptune's festive troop of followers and sea-creatures sport in Stockholm's waters. The juxtaposition of elegant and low life is humorous, sometimes burlesque, but always graceful and sympathetic. The songs are "most ingeniously" set to their music, which is nearly always borrowed and skilfully adapted. The song "Ack du min moder" was according to the musicologist James Massengale most likely written in the first half of 1770. It is recorded in Petter J. Hjelm's songbook, which was compiled between July 1770 and July 1771. Early shilling prints are recorded from 1772 and 1775.

== Song ==
=== Music and verse form ===
Melody of Epistle 23

"Ack du min moder" is a song with six verses of twelve lines each, the last line being repeated as a refrain after a phrase on the flute. It is sung to a melody in 3/4 time, marked Menuetto (Minuet, a French social dance for two people). The rhyming pattern is ABAB-CCD-EED-FF. Many of Bellman's melodies are adapted from well-known French tunes, but the origin of this song's melody is unknown.

=== Lyrics ===
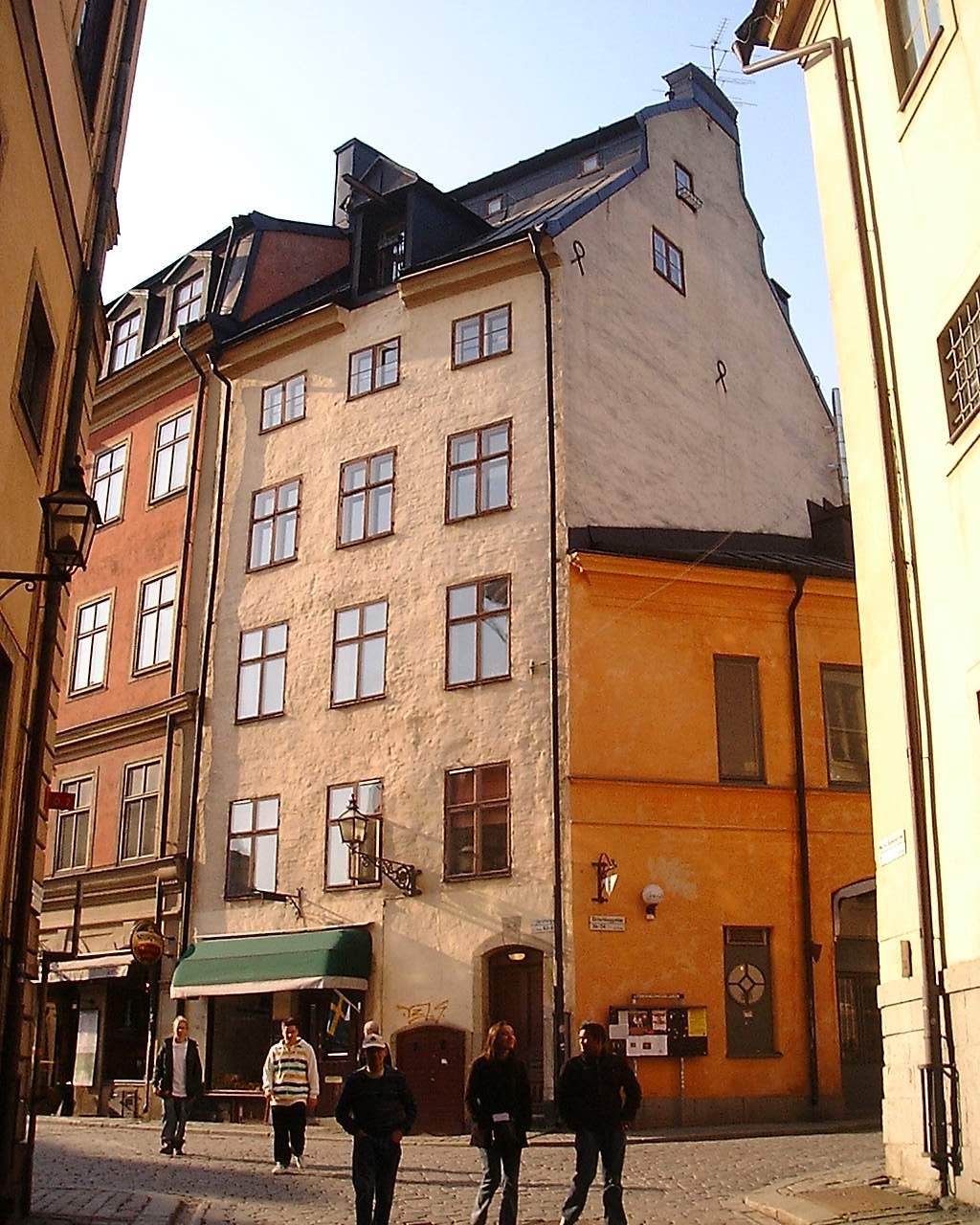
The Crawl-in Tavern (Krogen Kryp-In) of Epistle 23. Järntorget 85 in Stockholm's Gamla stan, the old town

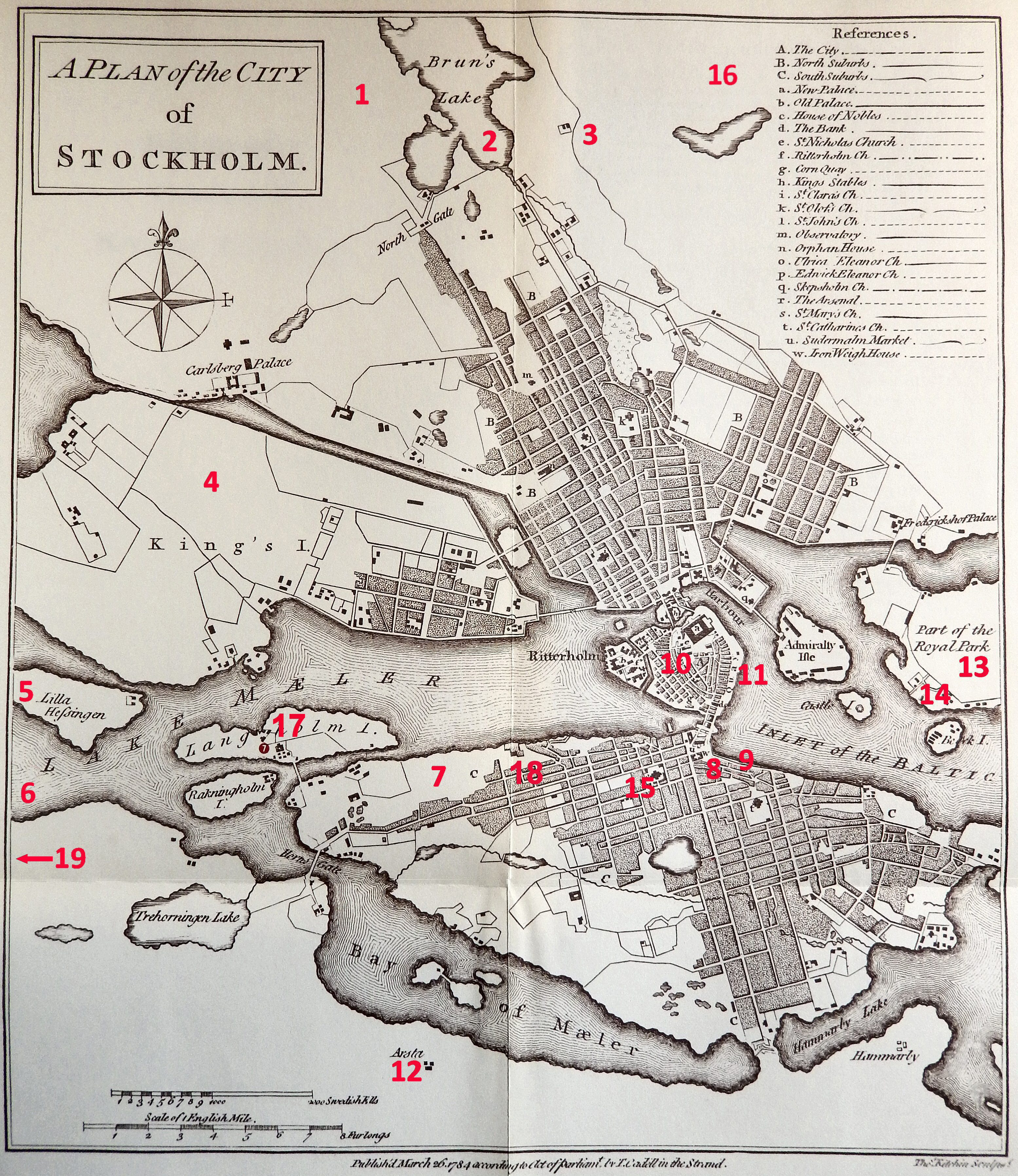
Map of Bellman's Stockholm, places of interest for his Fredman's Epistles and Songs on map from William Coxe's Travels into Poland, Russia, Sweden, and Denmark, 1784. 1 Haga park (S. 64) – 2 Brunnsviken – 3 Första Torpet (Ep. 80) – 4 Kungsholmen – 5 Hessingen (Ep. 48) – 6 Lake Mälaren (Ep. 48) – 7 Södermalm – 8 Urvädersgränd – 9 Lokatten tavern (Ep. 11, Ep. 59, Ep. 77), Bruna Dörren tavern (Ep. 24, Ep. 38) – 10 Gamla stan (Ep. 5, Ep. 9, Ep. 23, Ep. 28, Ep. 79) – 11 Skeppsbron Quay (Ep. 33) – 12 Årsta Castle – 13 Djurgården Park – (Ep. 25, Ep. 51, Ep. 82) – 14 Gröna Lund (Ep. 12, Ep. 62) – 15 Bellman's birthplace – 16 Fiskartorpet (Ep. 71) – 17 Lilla Sjötullen (Bellmanmuseet) (Ep. 48) – 18 Bensvarvars tavern (Ep. 40) 19 Rostock tavern (Ep. 45)

The performance begins as a lament, as Fredman lies drunk in a Stockholm gutter outside the Crawl-in Tavern, cursing his parents for conceiving him. He goes into enough despairing detail to include a curse on the carpenter who made the "four-poster bed" (paulun), unless it was "perhaps upon a table" that he was brought into being:

Du bordt haft lås och bom / För din Jungfrudom. / flauto... / För din Jungfrudom.
You should've had lock and bar / for your virginity. / flute... / for your virginity.

He imagines telling his mother that she should have locked and barred her door against his father. Then the sun starts to warm him, and at last the tavern door opens, and he can go inside:

Men krogdörn öpnas, Luckorna skrufvas; Ingen i staden klädd.
But the pub door is opening, the shutters are undone; no-one in the town is (yet) dressed.

He staggers down the steps to the bar.

Hvar är nu kappan? / Här ser jag trappan / Ned til Bacchi rum.
Where's my cloak? / Ah, here's the staircase / Down to Bacchus's room.

His creaking joints are "lubricated" with a stiff drink, and he comes round to thanking his mother and father for his life.

Nu ska de styfva leder blifva smorda, / Smorda all ihop.
Now my stiff limbs will be lubricated, / all lubricated at once.

The song thus traverses the emotions from an alcoholic's suicidal despair to delight in life. The formal structure of the verses reflects these moods, with the blessing in the final section replacing the initial cursing. For example, verse 2 has four lines beginning Tvi... ("A curse upon"); verse 6 has three lines beginning Tack... ("Thanks"), picking up the last line of verse 5.

== Reception ==
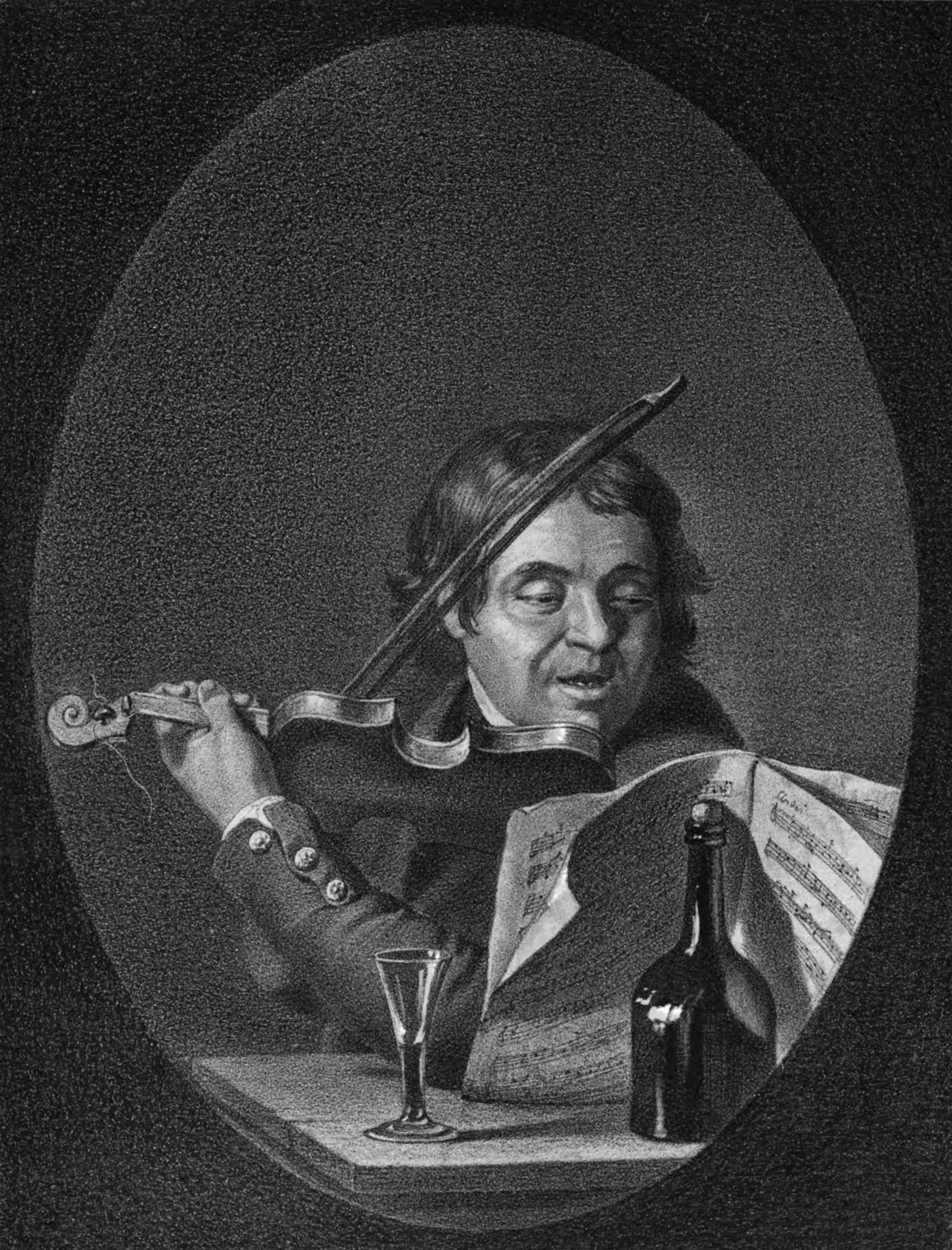
Lithograph from 1865 of a portrait of Jean Fredman by Pehr Hilleström

"Ack du min moder" is described by The Bellman Society as one of the most admired epistles, travelling as it does from the emotional depths of the gutter to the skies in the most drunken state of bliss. When the epistle is performed, it is to the public's "delight" as a "masterpiece". Anders Ringblom, writing in the cultural newspaper Tidskrift, calls the epistle an unvarnished picture of the old watchmaker as the rising sun warms him up, the tavern opens, and life once again becomes worth living. The scholar of literature Lars Lönnroth notes that all of this gives ample room for an entertainingly burlesque performance. The virtuoso soliloquy was accordingly described by the poet and literary historian Oscar Levertin at the end of the 19th century as "the to-be-or-not-to-be of Swedish literature".

== Analysis ==
=== Biblical echoes ===
Lönnroth commented that Bellman, in this as in other epistles, manages to combine a "low" burlesque approach with a genuinely mythic gaze that goes far beyond parody, awakening his audience's empathy for the portrayed figure. He notes that no. 23 is the first epistle in which Fredman is presented alone, and indeed it is subtitled a soliloquy. Fredman bemoans his fate, recalling to Lönnroth the biblical Job's complaints against God with phrases like "tired I tread my path". Other scholars including Anton Blanck and Åke Janzon have seen similarities to Job's complaints against God, noting that while the song is not one of Bellman's biblical parodies, he surely had the Bible in mind.

Indeed, Fredman seems, writes Lönnroth, to have the male point of view that it is always the woman who tempts, as in the Garden of Eden, and the man who helplessly falls for the temptation. Fredman sees his conception as a sin, suggesting that he was perhaps made "on a table", not in his parents' marital bed, hinting, Lönnroth notes, at the brutal picture painted in epistle 25, "Blåsen nu alla", where the woman kämpar och spritter pa ett bord ("struggles and quivers on a table"). All the same, he observes, Fredman's suffering is specifically Bacchanalian: it is caused by drink; but on the other hand, he must drink more to regain his strength and be able to follow the wine-god as one of his worshippers; Fredman's language, seeing his thin hands as vissna strån ("withered straws") recalls the prophet Isaiah's "all flesh is grass". The priestly tone is reinforced when Fredman admits "I am a heathen, [my] heart, mouth, and strength worship the god of wine". Then the tone changes, Fredman vill mig omgjorda ("shall gird myself up") in yet another biblical echo – God commands Job "Gird up now thy loins" – drinks, and is refreshed. The scholar of Swedish literature Helene Blomqvist comments that Epistle 23 recalls the psalms that complain of suffering, especially those about the "suffering righteous", such as psalms 22, 38, and 69. The song is, she writes, structured like those psalms, while "the whole poem echoes biblical language, biblical motifs, Christian faith and Christian culture".

The scholar of literature Olle Holmberg writes that whereas Bellman's plan had been to portray "Saint Fredman" as a sort of Saint Paul for the Bacchus cult, the biblical allusion in this "celebrated poem" is Old Testament rather than New. He notes that the "soliloquy" of the song's subtitle often had a religious connotation in the 18th century, and compares the Epistle to Jeremiah's lament:

Cursed be the day wherein I was born: let not the day wherein my mother bare me be blessed.
Cursed be the man who brought tidings to my father, saying, A man child is born unto thee; making him very glad.

The song's title, too, echoes another verse of Jeremiah, Ach! min moder at tu migh födt hafwer ("Woe is me, my mother, that thou hast borne me"). The biblical allusions continue in the second, rejoicing half of the poem; Janzon notes that smorda could mean "anointed with the oil of gladness" (as for example in Psalms 45:7), though Fredman means with brandy instead.

=== Social realism ===
Alongside the biblical overtones, Lönnroth states that the poem is powerfully social-realist, almost, he writes, "like an social justice reportage on rough sleepers in Stockholm's slums", as when in the third verse Fredman curses his old shoes, his ragged coat, and his blackened shirt, complains of his body's itching, and calls "come and help me up". Bellman's biographer Carina Burman comments that Ulla Winblad may have been a heavenly beauty, but most of Bellman's men look really dreadful. The lyrics may be realistic, but the song is not literally true in every detail: Burman notes that the real Fredman died in the spring of 1767, but he is lying in the gutter outside the tavern in the summer of 1768, while in Epistle 79, Charon i Luren tutar, the fictional Fredman dies in 1785.

The monologue of Epistle 23, Lönnroth observes, turns out to be the first in a series depicting the social injustice, disease, and misery in Gustavian Stockholm; examples include no. 30, "To father Movitz, during his disease, consumption", and no. 35, Bröderna fara väl vilse ibland, "On his muse and her instability".

Helene Blomqvist sees Bellman's approach as a very Lutheran way of presenting simple, sinful people as "pleasant and lovable". Like Luther, she writes, Bellman sees the holy not in the cathedral but in ordinary life, at table, in the bedroom, or even in the pub or the gutter outside it. Some researchers have, she writes, puzzled over Bellman's piety, but the scholar of Swedish literature Sven Thorén had shown that his viewpoint was "old Lutheran": closer, in Blomqvist's view, to Martin Luther himself than to the dry orthodoxy of his followers.

=== Aristotelian inheritance ===
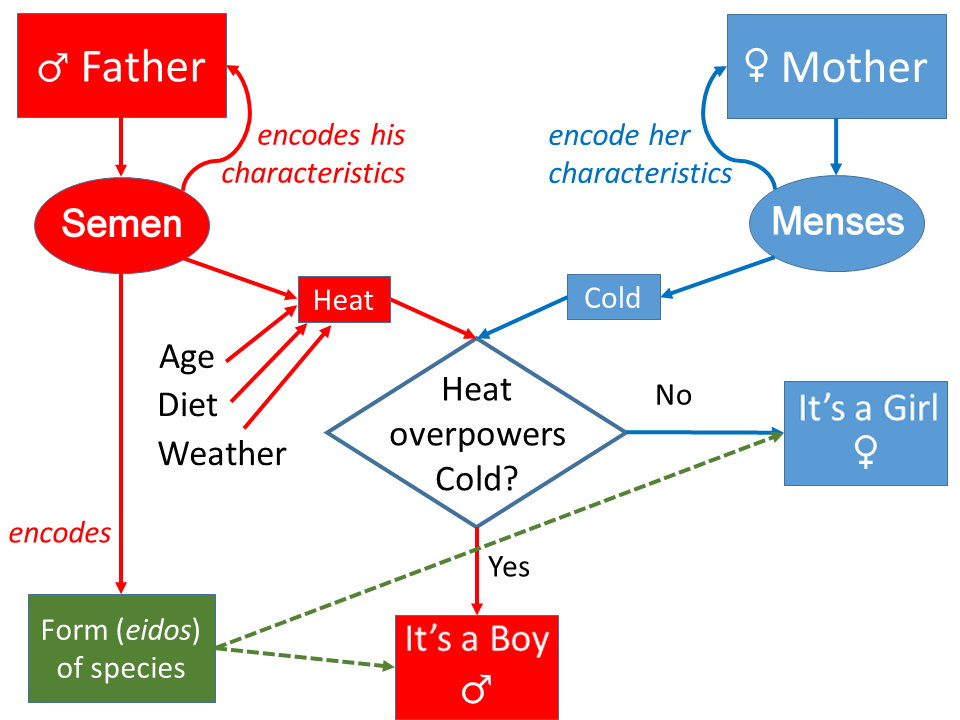
Aristotle's model of inheritance, with form entirely from the father. This was still among the possible models in the 18th century.

Holmberg points out another curious feature of the song: the word just in Just till min faders säng. Du första gnistan till mitt liv uptände; ("just to my father's bed. You lit the first spark of my life"). Holmberg wonders why it would matter which man his mother had conceived Fredman with, namely, whether that differently-conceived son would still have been Fredman. It was then a matter in dispute. In the classical era, Hippocrates had proposed that both the mother and the father produced seeds which combined to form the embryo, whereas Aristotle had argued that form came entirely from the father, while the mother contributed only matter. In the 17th century, Descartes still shared this view, whereas Harvey's observations of eggs gave women a major role. Leeuwenhoek's observations of spermatozoa made it seem that men contributed more, as the living homunculus, containing a preformed human, joined the merely material egg. In the 18th century, Buffon began with an Aristotelian viewpoint but moved towards the egg hypothesis. Holmberg notes that Epistle 27 indicates that Fredman thought he was shaped by his father: Känn der far min, känn där hans anda ("Feel there [in my face and limbs] my father, feel there his spirit"); and that Bellman may have chosen to characterise Fredman as holding an old-fashioned viewpoint.

== Performances ==
The first recording of the song was made by Sven-Bertil Taube in 1960.

It appears on the 1969 studio album Fred sjunger Bellman by Fred Åkerström, re-released on CD in 1990, and in a different style on his album Glimmande Nymf. It has also been recorded on the actor Mikael Samuelson's Sjunger Fredmans Epistlar, by Peter Ekberg Pelz, and by the musician and composer Martin Bagge.

== Sources ==
- Bellman, Carl Michael (1790). Fredmans epistlar (in Swedish). Stockholm: By Royal Privilege.
- Britten Austin, Paul (1967). The Life and Songs of Carl Michael Bellman: Genius of the Swedish Rococo. New York: Allhem, Malmö American-Scandinavian Foundation. ISBN 978-3-932759-00-0.
- Burman, Carina (2019). Bellman. Biografin [Bellman: The Biography] (in Swedish). Stockholm: Albert Bonniers Förlag. ISBN 978-9100141790.
- Hassler, Göran; Dahl, Peter (illus.) (1989). Bellman – en antologi [Bellman – an anthology] (in Swedish). En bok för alla. ISBN 91-7448-742-6. (contains the most popular Epistles and Songs, with sheet music)
- Holmberg, Olle (2006). "'Ach Du Min Moder ...': En kommentar till Fredmans epistel n:o 23". In Jens Kr. Andersen; Eva Holbek; Hans Lundsteen; Soren Sorensen (eds.). Nyere Bellman-Studier og -Kommentarer [New Bellman Studies and Commentaries] (PDF) (in Swedish). Denmark: Selskabet Bellman i Danmark. pp. 9–23. ISBN 87-7917-178-8.
- Kleveland, Åse; Ehrén, Svenolov (illus.) (1984). Fredmans epistlar & sånger [The songs and epistles of Fredman] (in Swedish). Stockholm: Informationsförlaget. ISBN 91-7736-059-1. (with facsimiles of sheet music from first editions in 1790, 1791)
- Leroi, Armand Marie (2014). The Lagoon: How Aristotle Invented Science. Bloomsbury. ISBN 978-1-4088-3622-4.
- Lönnroth, Lars (2005). Ljuva karneval! : om Carl Michael Bellmans diktning [Lovely Carnival! : about Carl Michael Bellman's Verse] (in Swedish). Stockholm: Albert Bonniers Förlag. ISBN 978-91-0-057245-7. OCLC 61881374.
- Massengale, James Rhea (1979). The Musical-Poetic Method of Carl Michael Bellman. Stockholm: Almqvist & Wiksell International. ISBN 91-554-0849-4.
