= Carl Michael Bellman =

Swedish poet, songwriter and composer (1740–1795)

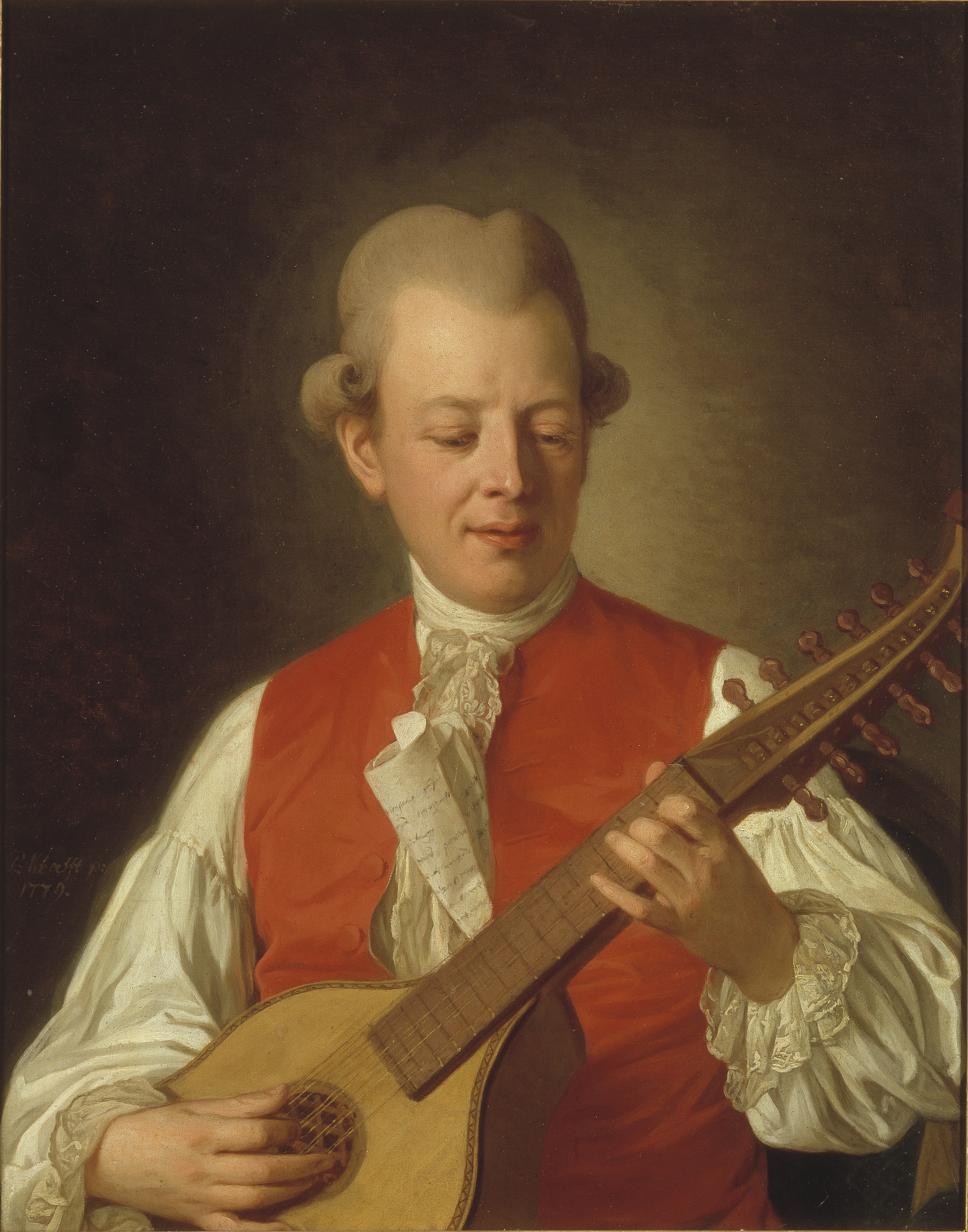
- Bellman playing the cittern, in a portrait by Per Krafft, 1779
- Born: Carl Michael Bellman; 4 February 1740; Stockholm, Sweden
- Died: 11 February 1795 (aged 55); Stockholm, Sweden
- Resting place: Klara Church
- Known for: Poetry, song
- Notable work: Fredman's epistles Fredman's songs
- Spouse: Lovisa Grönlund (m. 1777)
- Children: Gustav, Elis, Carl, Adolf
- Patrons: King Gustav III

Carl Michael Bellman (Swedish pronunciation: [ˈkɑːɭ ˈmîːkaɛl ˈbɛ̌lːman]; 4 February 1740 – 11 February 1795) was a Swedish songwriter, composer, musician, poet, and entertainer. He is a central figure in the Swedish song tradition and remains a powerful influence in Swedish music, as well as in Scandinavian literature, to this day. He has been compared to Shakespeare, Beethoven, Mozart, and Hogarth, but his gift, using elegantly rococo classical references in comic contrast to sordid drinking and prostitution—at once regretted and celebrated in song—is unique.

Bellman is best known for two collections of poems set to music, Fredman's epistles (Fredmans epistlar) and Fredman's songs (Fredmans sånger). Each consists of about 70 songs. The general theme is drinking, but the songs "most ingeniously" combine words and music to express feelings and moods ranging from humorous to elegiac, romantic to satirical.

Bellman's patrons included King Gustav III of Sweden, who called him a master improviser. Bellman's songs continue to be performed and recorded by musicians from Scandinavia and in other languages, including English, French, German, Italian, and Russian. Several of his songs including Gubben Noak and Fjäriln vingad are known by heart by many Swedes. His legacy further includes a museum in Stockholm and a society that fosters interest in him and his work.

== Biography ==
=== Early life ===
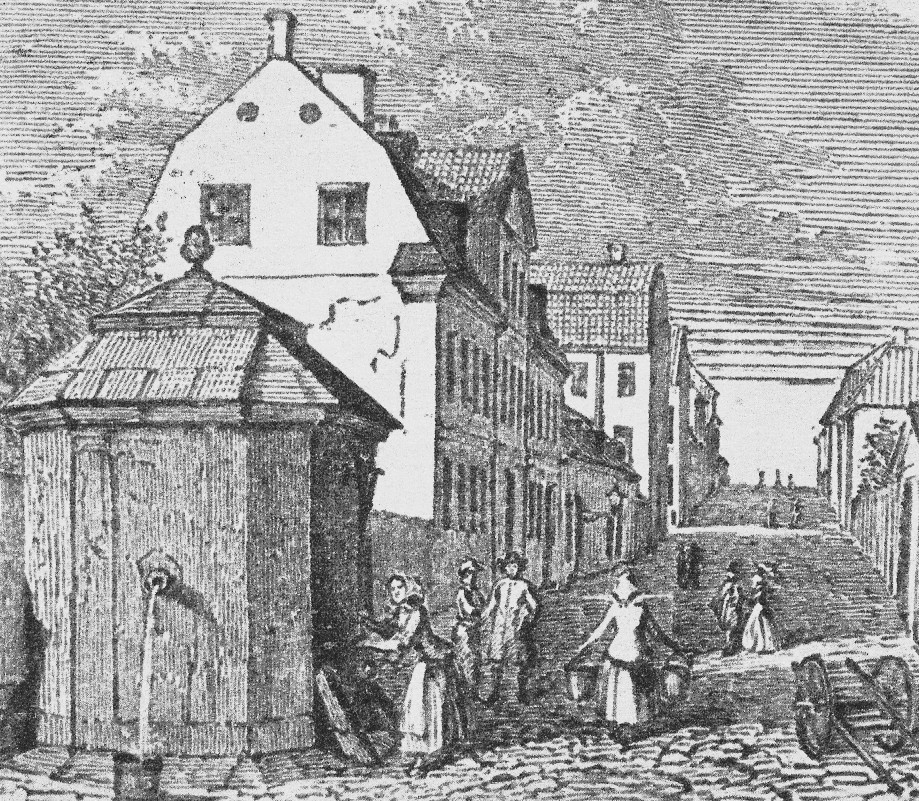
Bellman's birthplace, the Stora Daurerska house in Södermalm, Stockholm. Carl Svante Hallbeck, 1861

Carl Michael Bellman was born on 4 February 1740 in the Stora Daurerska house, which was one of the finest in the Södermalm district of Stockholm. The house was the property of his maternal grandmother, Catharina von Santen, who had brought up his father, orphaned as a small child. Carl Michael's parents were Johan Arndt Bellman, a civil servant, and Catharina Hermonia, daughter of the priest of the local Maria parish. Her family was wholly Swedish, whereas Johan's family had German origins: they had come from Bremen in about 1660. When Carl Michael was four the family moved to a smaller, single storey dwelling called the Lilla Daurerska house. He briefly went to a local school, but was educated mainly by private tutors. He was the eldest of 15 children who lived long enough for their births to be registered. His parents had intended him to become a priest, but he fell ill with a fever, and on recovering found he could express any thought in rhyming verse. His parents appointed a tutor called Ennes who Bellman called "a genius". Bellman was taught French, German, Italian, English, and Latin. He read Horace and Boileau; Ennes taught him to write poetry and to translate French and German hymns. He was familiar with stories from the Bible including the Apocrypha, many of which found their way into the songs he composed in later life. However, expenses including the Swedish tradition of hospitality left the family with no money to start him off in life with a journey to the south of Europe, such as to Spain to visit his uncle, Jacob Martin Bellman, who was the Swedish Consul in Cádiz. Carl Michael translated a French book by Du Four and dedicated it to his uncle, but the hint was ignored. Deep in debt, at the end of 1757 the family sent Carl Michael to Sweden's central bank Riksbanken as an unpaid trainee. He had no aptitude for numbers, instead discovering the taverns and brothels which were to figure so largely in his songs.

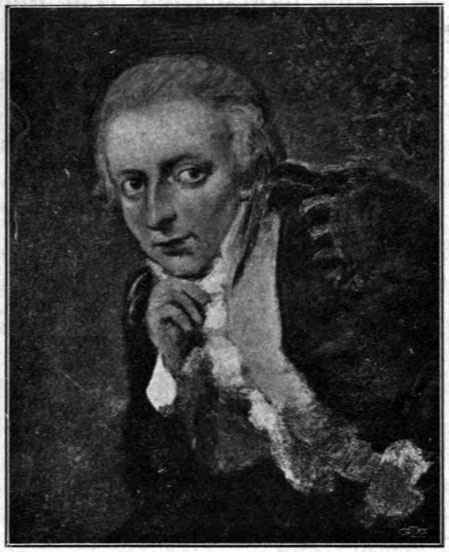
Bellman by Elias Martin, 18th century

As the banking career was not working out – and as trainees were (after a period with a relaxed regime) again required to sit an exam, for which Bellman was ill-equipped – he took a break in 1758, going to Uppsala University, where Linnaeus was professor of botany. The idea of attending lectures was no more congenial than banking, and he stayed only one term; one of his songs (FS 28) records that "He contemplated Uppsala—the beer stung his mouth—love distracted his wits..." However, he met young men (such as Carl Bonde) from wealthy and noble families, went drinking with them, and started to entertain them with his songs. Bellman returned to the bank job, and seems quickly to have fallen into financial difficulty: "a jungle of debts, sureties and bondsmen began to proliferate around him." The character of bailiff Blomberg appears in his songs (e.g. FS 14), constantly trying to track down debtors and seize all their property. The law allowed the bankrupt only one way to escape from debtors' prison: to leave Sweden. In 1763, Bellman ran away to Norway. From the safety of Halden (then called Fredrikshald) he writes to the Council applying first for a passport, and then for a safe-conduct, both of which were granted. Meanwhile, his father had first mortgaged the Lilla Daurerska house, and then sold it: the family's finances were no better than his own. Even worse, by April 1764 the Bank had become tired of the riotous behaviour of its young men: its investigations showed that Bellman had been the ringleader, leading them (the Bank wrote) into "gambling, masquerades, picnics and suchlike". Bellman resigned, his safe banking career at an end.

=== Poetry and song ===
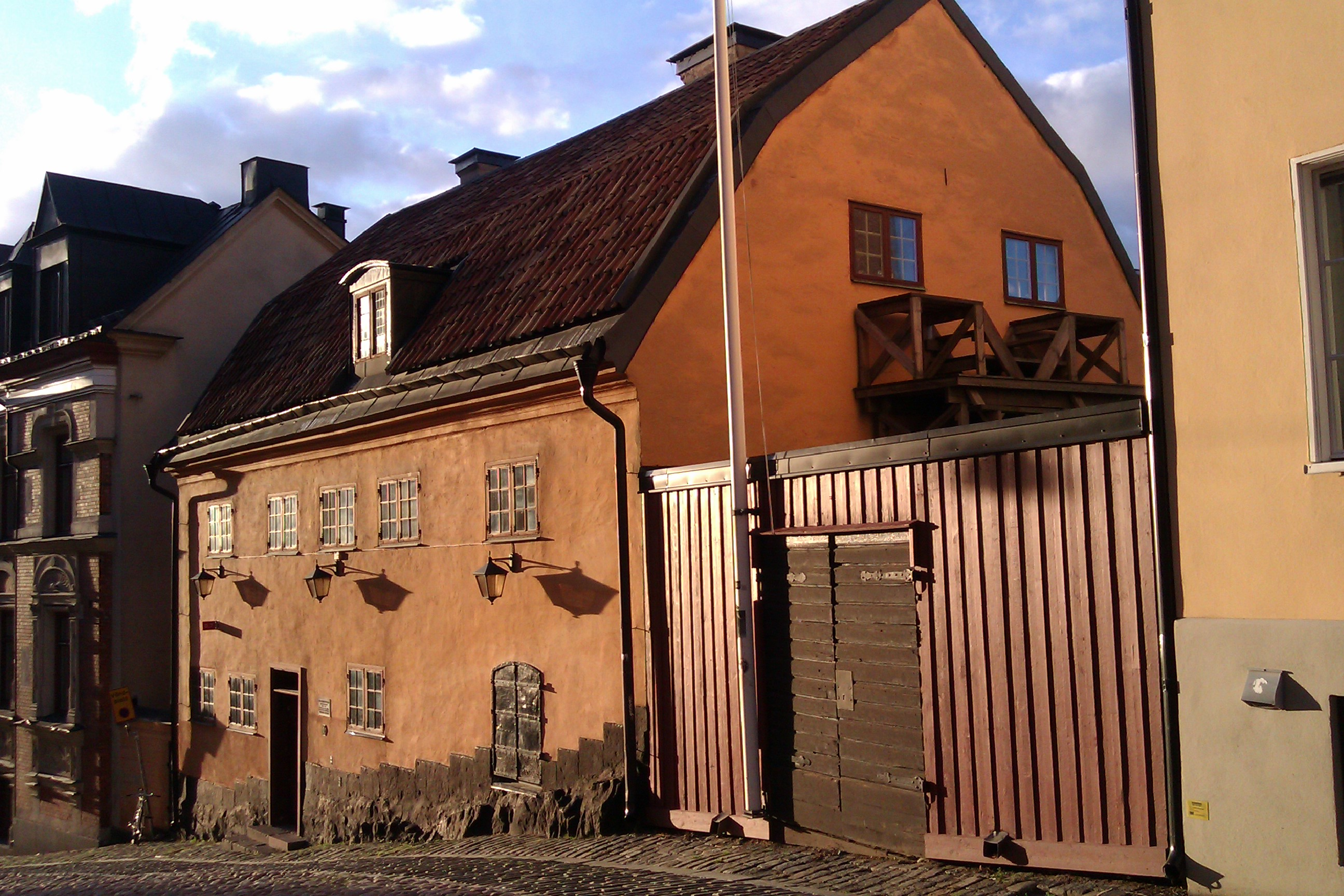
The Stockholm house where Bellman lived from 1770 to 1774

In 1765, Bellman's parents died; deeply moved, he wrote a religious poem. Then his fortunes improved: someone found him a job, first in the Office of Manufactures, then in the Customs, and he was able once again to live happily in Stockholm, observing the people of the city, with at least a modest salary. In 1768, his life's work as we now know it got under way:

Bellman had begun to compose an entirely new sort of song. A genre which 'had no model and can have no successors' (Kellgren), these songs were to grow swiftly in number until they made up the great work on which Bellman's reputation as a poet chiefly rests.

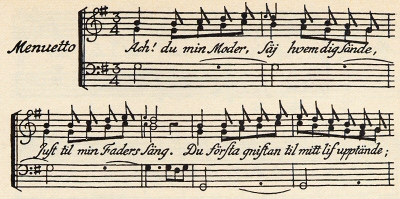
The start of Fredman's Epistle No. 23, "Alas, thou my mother". To a graceful minuet tune, Fredman, lying drunk in the gutter outside the Crawl-in tavern, "a summer night in the year 1768", blames his mother for his conception; but a morning visit to the tavern revives his spirits.

Bellman mostly played the cittern, (Note: The instrument was inherited from his grandfather, Johan Arndt Bellman (1663–1709), a professor and later chancellor of Uppsala University, who supposedly bought it in Rome. It has survived, and has been exhibited at the National Museum in Stockholm.) becoming the most famous player of this instrument in Sweden. His portrait by Per Krafft shows him playing an oval instrument with twelve strings, arranged as six pairs. His first songs were "parody songs", a common form of entertainment at the time.

Between 1769 and 1773, Bellman wrote 65 of 82 of his Epistles, as well as many poems. He attempted to publish the poems in 1772, but was unable to obtain the permission of the king, Gustav III, as a political coup intervened. He finally managed to obtain the permission in 1774, but soon discovered that the cost of printing, especially as he was determined to publish the sheet music alongside the text, was prohibitive given his ruinous finances, and he was forced to put off his plans. In 1776, the king gave him a sinecure job as secretary to the national lottery; this supported him for the rest of his life.

On 19 December 1777, at the age of 37, he married the 22-year-old Lovisa Grönlund in Klara Church. They had four children, Gustav, Elis, Karl, and Adolf; Elis died young. Throughout his life, but especially during the 1770s, Bellman also wrote religious poetry, seeing no conflict with his bacchanalian works; he published collections of his religious poems in 1781 and 1787. He wrote some ten plays (none with particularly strong plots) as divertimentos, some of them later serving as entertainments at the royal court. The plays fill Volume 6 of his collected works. In 1783, Bellman brought out The Temple of Bacchus (Bacchi Tempel), perhaps hoping to establish his reputation as a poet, rather than the merry entertainer that he was in fact known as at the time; but he always stood out in people's minds as unique, a different kind of writer and performer.

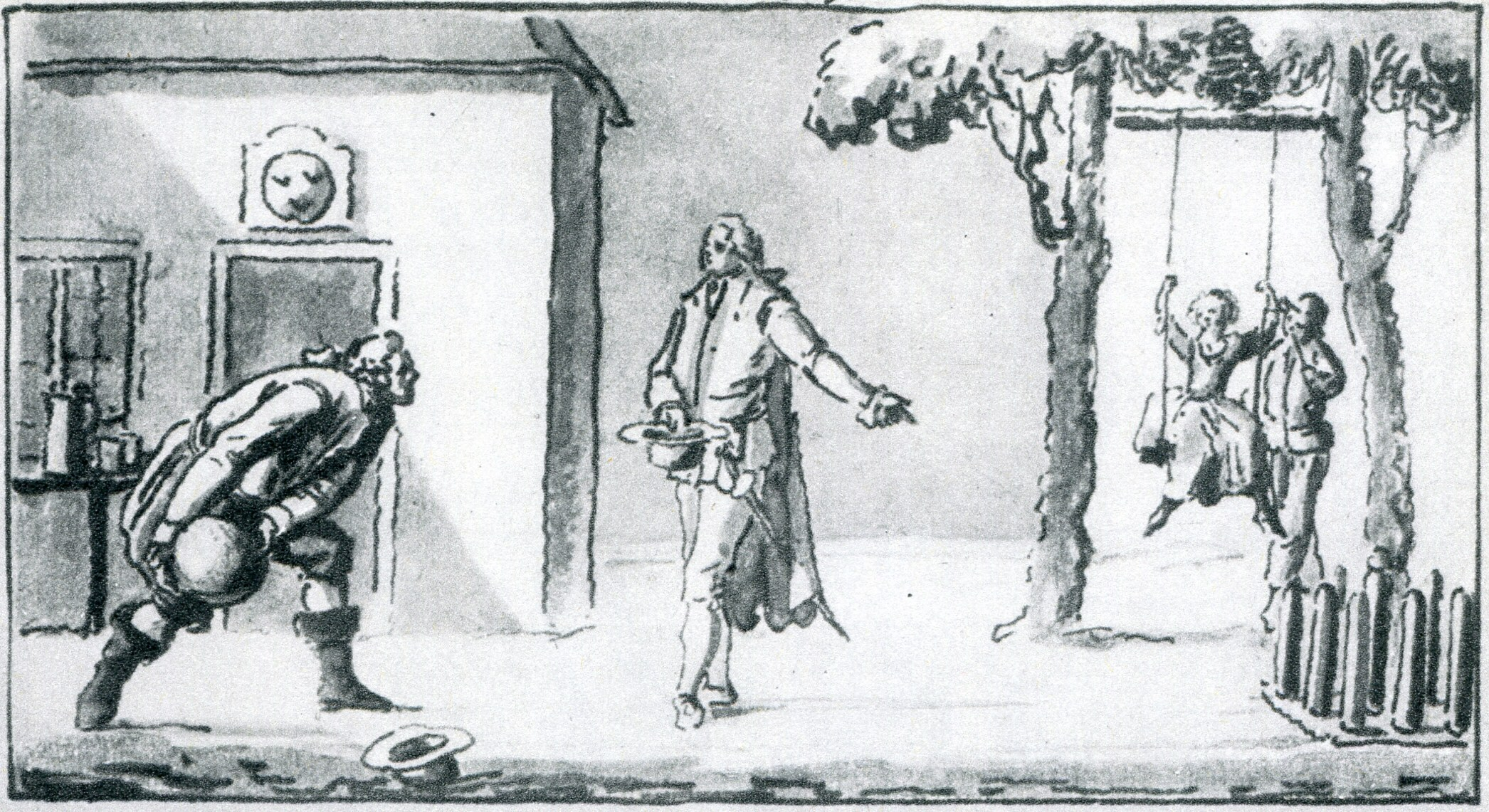
Wash drawing by Pehr Hilleström in a 1792 letter showing Bellman in Swedish dress with Mollberg playing bowls.

Bellman's main works are the 82 Fredman's epistles (Fredmans epistlar, 1790) and the 65 Fredman's songs (Fredmans sånger, 1791). Their themes include the pleasures of drunkenness and sex. Against this backdrop, Bellman deals with themes of love, death, and the transitoriness of life. The settings of his songs reflect life in 18th-century Stockholm, but often refer to Greek and Roman mythological characters such as the goddess of love, Venus (or her Swedish equivalent, Fröja), Neptune and his retinue of water-nymphs, the love-god Cupid, the ferryman Charon and Bacchus, the god of wine and pleasure. Many of Fredman's Epistles are peopled by a cast which includes the clockmaker Jean Fredman, the prostitute or "nymph" Ulla Winblad, the alcoholic ex-soldier Movitz, and Father Berg, a virtuoso on several instruments. Some of these were based on living models, others probably not. Ulla Winblad was widely believed to have been closely based on Maria Kristina Kiellström, though the real woman, a silk worker once arrested for alleged prostitution, was not the ideal romantic figure of Bellman's songs. Fredman's songs also include Old Testament figures such as Noah and Judith.

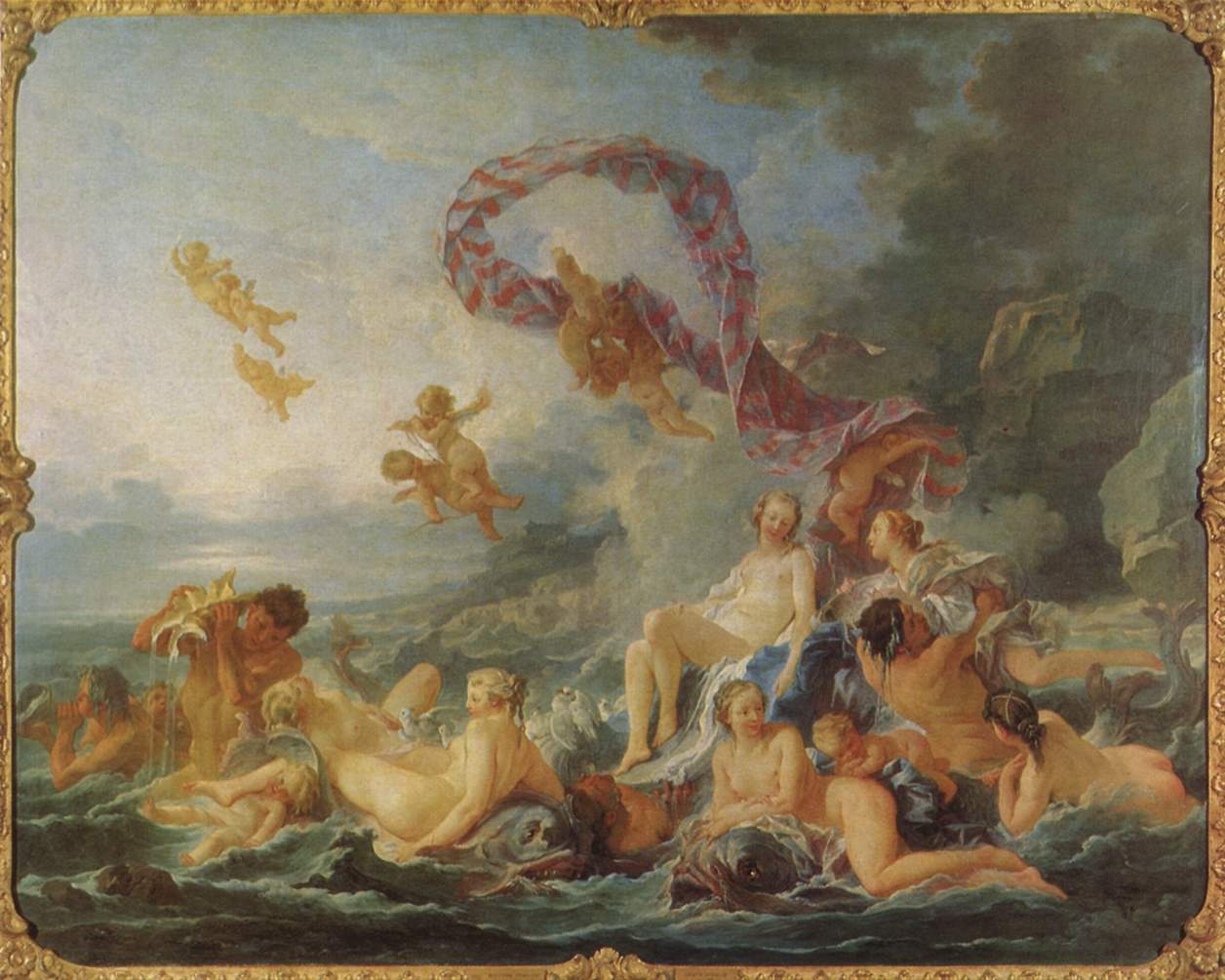
François Boucher's 1740 painting Triumph of Venus is the model for Epistle 25, "All blow now!", where Bellman humorously contrasts rococo classical allusions with bawdy remarks.

Bellman achieved his effects of rococo elegance and humour through precisely organised incongruity. For example, Epistle 25, "Blåsen nu alla!" (All blow now!), begins with Venus crossing the water, as in François Boucher'sTriumph of Venus, but when she disembarks, Bellman transforms her into a lustful Ulla Winblad. Similarly, the ornate and civilized minuet melody of "Ack du min Moder" (Alas, thou my mother) contrasts with the text: Fredman is lying with a hangover in the gutter outside a tavern, complaining bitterly about life. Ulla Winblad ("vineleaf") recurs through the Epistles; Britten Austin comments that

Ulla is at once a nymph of the taverns and a goddess of a rococo universe of graceful and hot imaginings.

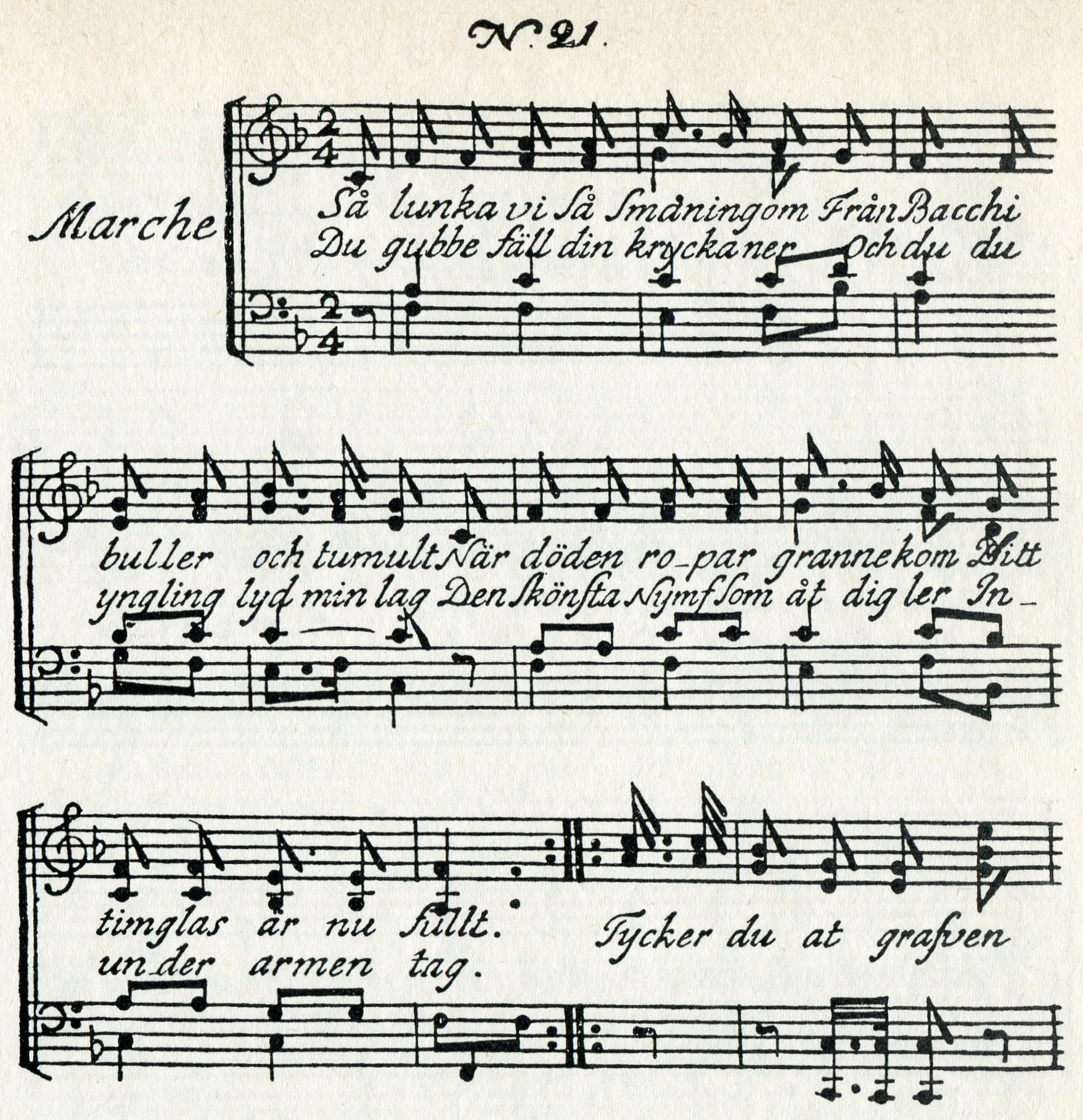
Start of Fredman's Song 21, "Så lunka vi så småningom" (So we gradually amble). March, 2/4 time, 1791. The song refers to "Bacchus's tumult"; the gravediggers discuss whether the grave is too deep, taking swigs from a bottle of brännvin.

The songs are "most ingeniously" set to music, the melodies accentuated by the bold construction of music, word pictures and choice of words, while the music brings out a hidden dimension not seen if the words are simply read as verse. The poems themselves, far from being the brilliant improvisations that they appear, are striking in their "formal virtuosity". They may be drinking songs in name, but in structure they are tightly woven into a precise metre, situating the "frenzied bacchanalia within a strict and decorous rococo frame." The musicologist James Massengale writes that the technique of reusing tunes in musical parody had already been overused and had fallen into disrepute by Bellman's time, just as his subject matter was initially looked down on. Despite this, Massengale argues

Bellman chose to perfect his musical-poetic vehicle. He refers to the result ... not as 'parody' but as 'den muçiska Poesien', [musical poetry] ...

Bellman's exceptional case, then, is that of a poetic genius who worked with an art form which in the hands of others was usually insignificant.

Massengale observes that Bellman was "fully aware of the complexity of the musical-poetic problem; his poems were not simply talented improvisations." and points out that Bellman was "also interested in concealing this complexity", with the discrepancies between the music and the poetry "apparently resolved".

Bellman was a gifted entertainer and mimic. He was able to

go into a room apart and behind a half-open door mimic twenty or thirty people at the same time, a crowd pushing its way on to one of the Djurgården ferries, perhaps, or the uproarious atmosphere of a seaman's tavern. The illusion was so startling, his listeners could have sworn a mob of 'shoe-polishers, customs spies, seamen ... coalmen, washerwomen ... herring packers, tailors and bird-catchers' had burst into the next room.

In 1790, the Swedish Academy awarded Bellman its annual Lundblad prize of 50 Riksdaler for the most interesting piece of literature of the year. Although Fredman's Epistles was neither exactly literature as understood by the academy, nor meeting the standards of elegant taste, the poet and critic Johan Henric Kellgren and the King ensured that Bellman won the prize.

=== Later life ===
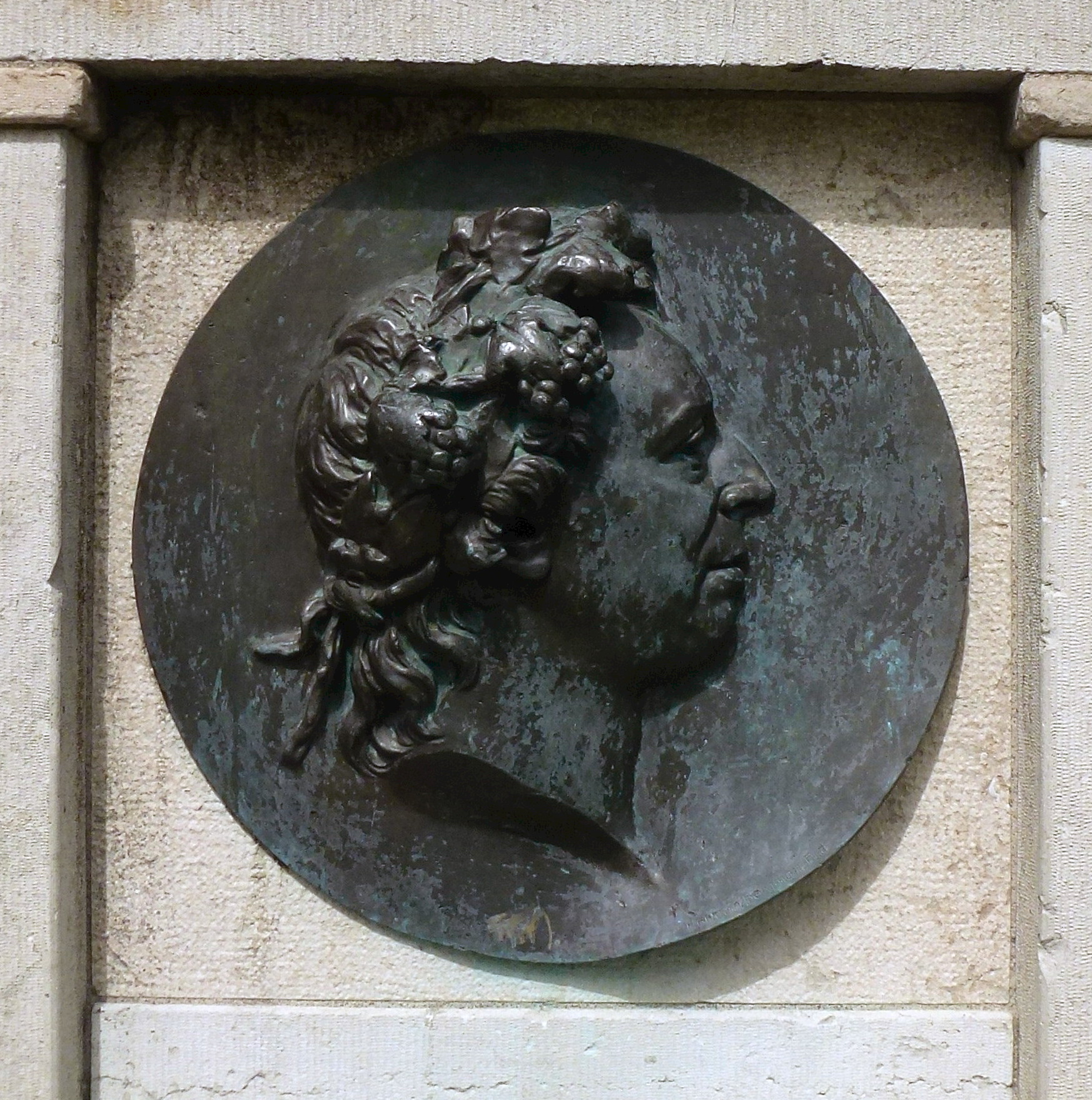
Bronze memorial medallion of Bellman by Sergel

After the assassination of the King at the Stockholm opera in 1792, support for the liberal arts was withdrawn. Bellman, already in poor health from alcoholism, went into decline, drinking increasingly heavily. His drinking very likely contributed to his gout, which troubled him badly in 1790. He also caught tuberculosis: the disease had already killed his mother, and by the winter of 1792, he was seriously ill.

As well as being ill, he was imprisoned—after struggling with debts and haunted by the threat of ruin and imprisonment all his life—"for a wretched[ly small] debt of 150 Rdr". The rumour was that a former Customs colleague, E. G. Nobelius, had had his advances to Louise Bellman rejected, and in revenge had sued Bellman for the debt, knowing he was penniless: he owed a total of almost 4,000 Riksdaler. On 11 February 1795, he died in his sleep in his house in Gamla Kungsholmsbrogatan. He was buried in Klara churchyard with no gravestone, its location now unknown. The Swedish Academy belatedly placed a memorial in the churchyard in 1851, complete with a bronze medallion by Johan Tobias Sergel.

== Reception ==
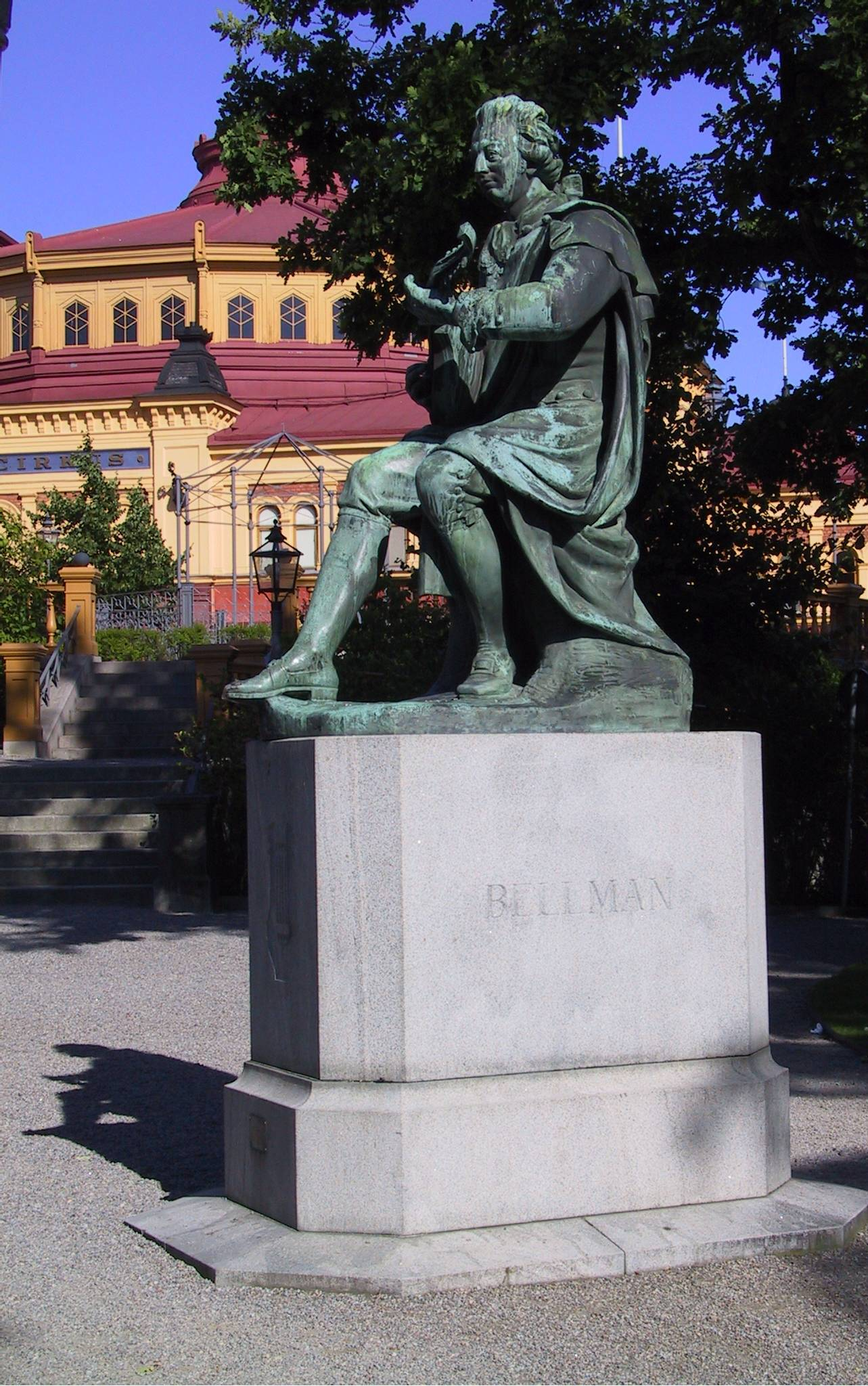
Statue of Bellman by Alfred Nyström, 1872, in Stockholm's Djurgården

King Gustav III called Bellman "Il signor improvisatore" (The master improviser).

Bellman has been compared with poets and musicians as diverse as Shakespeare and Beethoven. Åse Kleveland notes that he has been called "Swedish poetry's Mozart, and Hogarth", observing that

The comparison with Hogarth was no accident. Like the English portrait painter, Bellman drew detailed pictures of his time in his songs, not so much of life at court as of ordinary people's everyday.

Paul Britten Austin says instead simply that:

Bellman is unique among great poets, I think, in that virtually his entire opus is conceived to music. Other poets, of course, notably our Elizabethans, have written songs. But song was only one branch of their art. They did not leave behind, as Bellman did, a great musical-literary work nor paint in words and music a canvas of their age. Nor are their songs dramatic.

== Legacy ==
=== Performance and recordings ===
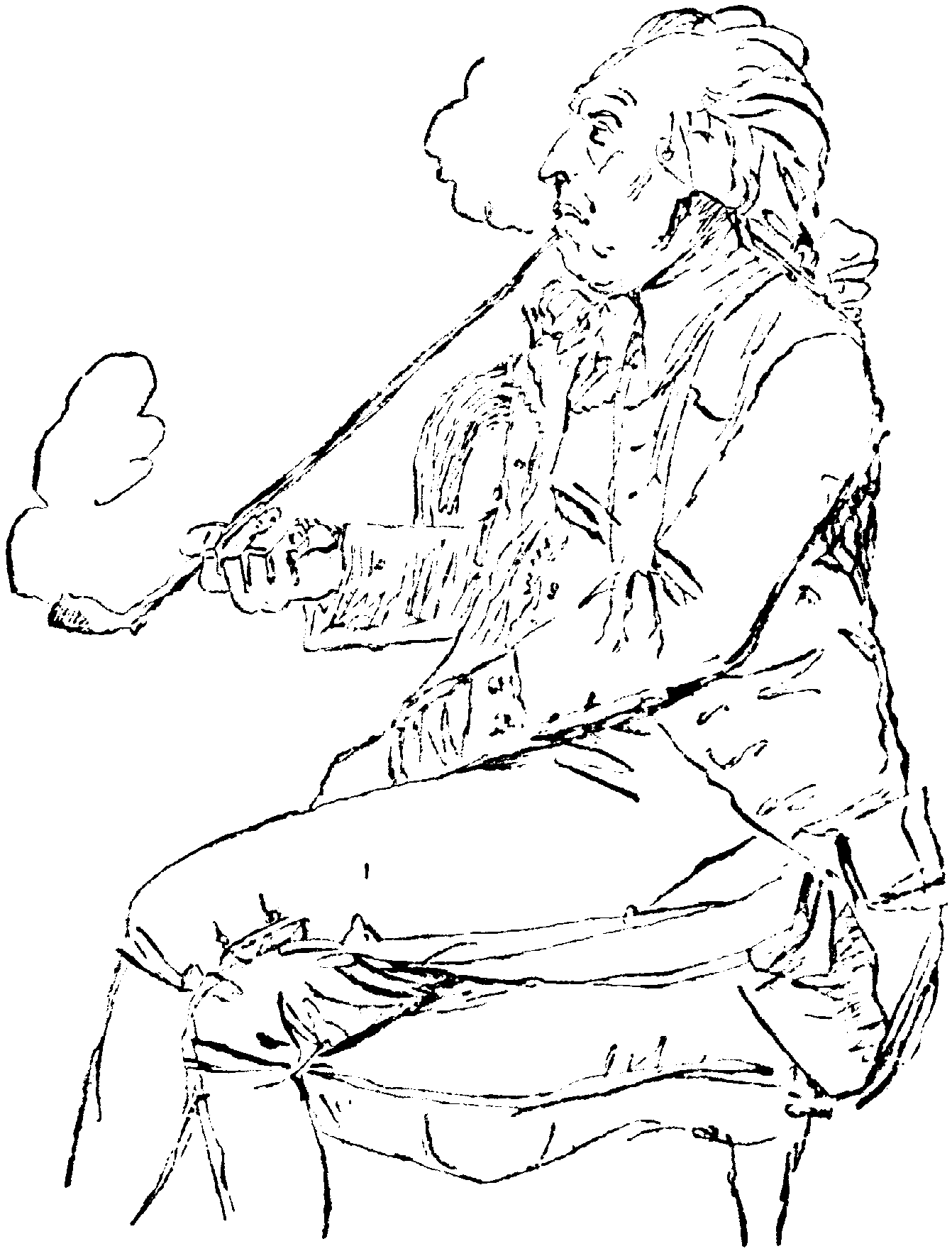
Portrait of Bellman, drawn by the sculptor Johan Tobias Sergel, 1792

Bellman's informal Bacchi Orden (Order of Bacchus) was replaced in the 1770s by the more structured Bacchanalian society Par Bricole, which still exists in the 21st century. It enabled Bellman to publish his book Bacchi Tempel in 1783. When the tradition of solo performance of his songs died out, Par Bricole continued to perform his songs as choral pieces.

Bellman's poetry continued to be read and sung throughout the 19th century, contrary to the widespread belief among researchers that he was largely forgotten during this period. His songs were sung especially by the urban bourgeoisie and in fraternities, but also in aristocratic circles and ordinary people in the countryside. The Orphei Drängar Vocal Society, named after a phrase in Epistle 14, was founded in Uppsala in 1853; the song became their trademark. The Epistles and Songs were published in chapbooks, sung at festivals and performed in a variety of concerts and entertainments. Figures such as Fredman, Ulla Winblad and Movitz, as well as Bellman himself were painted on tavern walls and memorabilia such as plates, beer tankards and hipflasks. Curiously, Bellman was celebrated at least as enthusiastically in polite and abstemious circles, though with bowdlerized versions of the songs.

Major interpreters of Bellman's songs include Sven-Bertil Taube, who helped to start the 1960s Bellman renaissance; Fred Åkerström, who brought a fresh earthiness to Bellman interpretation; and the Dutch-born Cornelis Vreeswijk, who fitted Bellman to the style of American blues. Other recordings have been made by Evert Taube, and as rock music by Joakim Thåström, Candlemass or Marduk. They are also performed as choral music and as drinking songs. Martin Bagge has recreated Bellman's dramatic style complete with period costume. In 2020, Uppsala stadsteater and Västmanlands Teater created Bellman 2.0, a costumed theatre concert, directed by Nikolaj Cederholm with Fredman's Epistles and Fredman's Songs arranged by Kåre Bjerkø for guitar, electric guitar, double bass, cello, tuba, clarinet, drumkit and percussion, keyboards, accordion, and five voices.

=== Translations ===
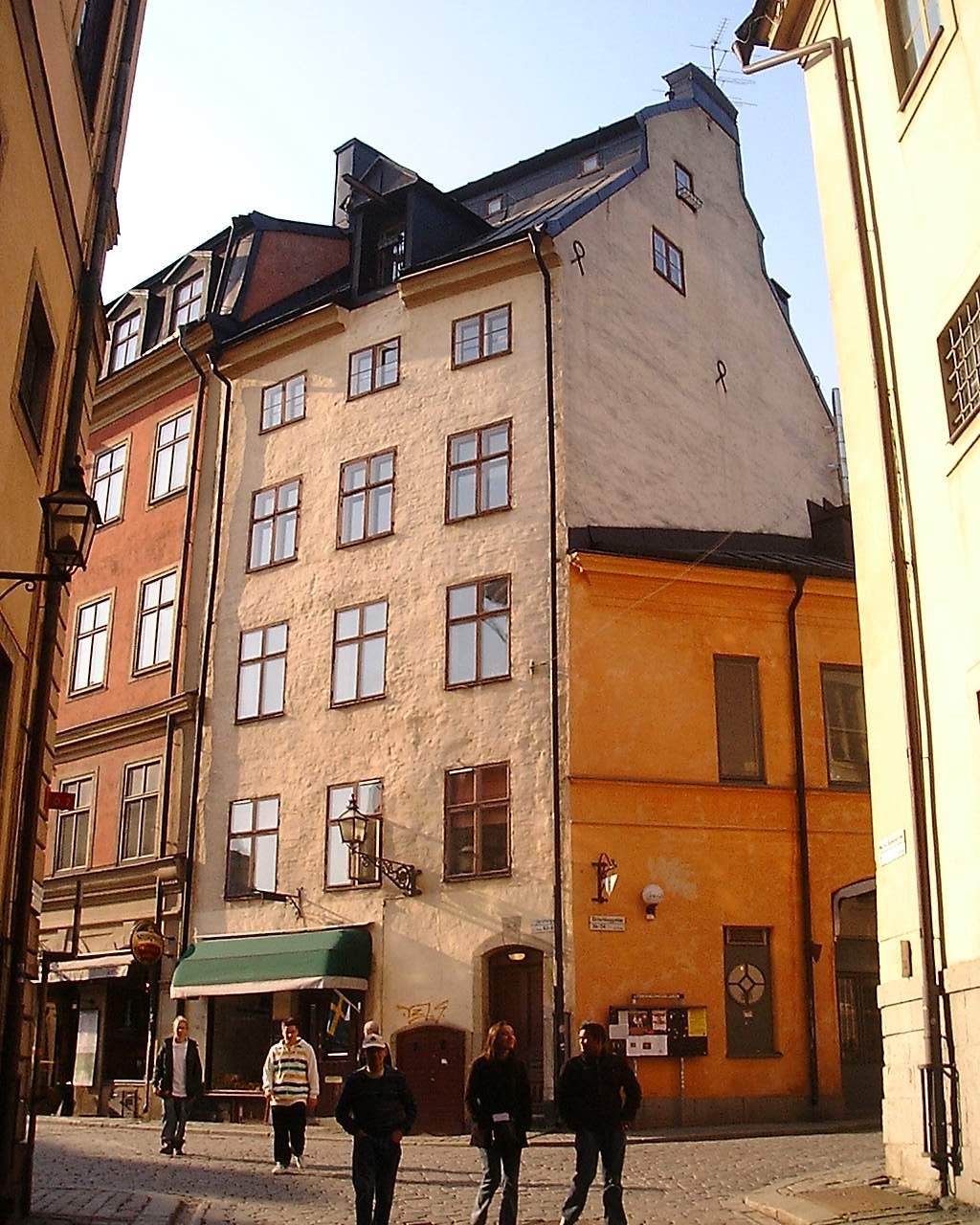
The Crawl-in Tavern (Krogen Kryp-In) of Epistle 23. Järntorget 85 in Stockholm's Old Town

Bellman has been translated into at least 20 languages, including German by Hannes Wader. German Communist leader Karl Liebknecht liked Bellman's songs and translated some into German. English interpretations have been recorded by performers including William Clauson and Martin Best. Freddie Langrind made some Norwegian translations in 2008.

Books in English with translations of Bellman's work have been written by Charles Wharton Stork in 1917, Hendrik Willem van Loon in 1939, Paul Britten Austin, and the historian Michael Roberts. In English, the most thorough treatment of Bellman's life is also by Britten Austin. Van Loon's The Last of the Troubadours: The Life and Music of Carl Michael Bellman (1740–1795) was inspired by a visit to Sweden, and tried to introduce the unknown Bellman to an American audience, but critics felt his version of twenty of the songs was "stiff and often ungraceful", not doing justice to their composer.

=== Memorials ===
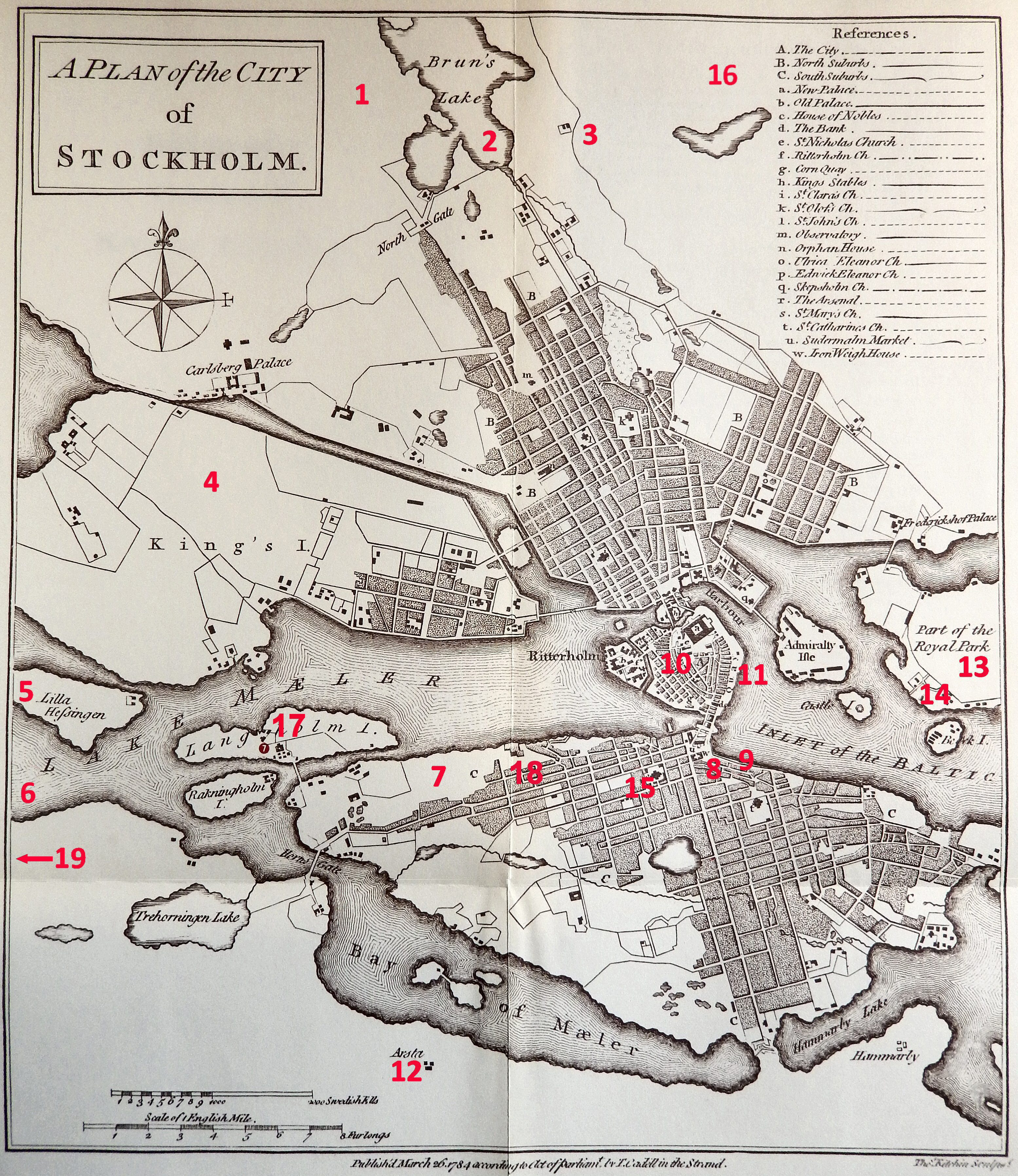
Map of Bellman's Stockholm, places of interest for his Fredman's Epistles and Songs on map from William Coxe's Travels into Poland, Russia, Sweden, and Denmark, 1784. 1 Haga park (S. 64) – 2 Brunnsviken – 3 Första Torpet (Ep. 80) – 4 Kungsholmen – 5 Hessingen (Ep. 48) – 6 Lake Mälaren (Ep. 48) – 7 Södermalm – 8 Urvädersgränd – 9 Lokatten tavern (Ep. 11, Ep. 59, Ep. 77), Bruna Dörren tavern (Ep. 24, Ep. 38) – 10 Gamla stan (Ep. 5, Ep. 9, Ep. 23, Ep. 28, Ep. 79) – 11 Skeppsbron Quay (Ep. 33) – 12 Årsta Castle – 13 Djurgården Park – (Ep. 25, Ep. 51, Ep. 82) – 14 Gröna Lund (Ep. 12, Ep. 62) – 15 Bellman's birthplace – 16 Fiskartorpet (Ep. 71) – 17 Lilla Sjötullen (Bellmanmuseet) (Ep. 48) – 18 Bensvarvars tavern (Ep. 40) 19 Rostock tavern (Ep. 45)

Bellman was the subject of an 1844 ballet choreographed by August Bournonville. Bellman features as a character, along with Ulla Winblad and King Gustav III, in the first episode of the Swedish television series "Nisse Hults historiska snedsteg" (Nisse Hult's historical slips) by SVT Drama. Bellman appears with his cittern and various objects from Fredman's Epistles and Fredman's Songs on a 100 Swedish kronor postage stamp issued in 2014 and designed by Beata Boucht; he was shown on earlier Swedish stamps in 1940 and 1990, commemorating the 200th and 250th anniversaries of his birth, and again in 2006. Bellmansgatan in Stockholm's Södermalm district is named for Bellman; Stieg Larsson places the apartment of his Millennium trilogy hero Mikael Blomkvist in Bellmansgatan, which Dan Burstein and Arne de Keijzer suggest is meant to provide Bellman associations.

=== Bellman jokes ===
Swedish schoolchildren tell Bellman jokes about a person named Bellman, an antihero or modern-day trickster with little or no connection to the poet. The first known Bellman joke is in a book from 1835, which quoted a letter written in 1808 by a contemporary of Bellman. 19th-century Bellman jokes were told by adults and focused on Bellman's life at court; they often related to sex. In the 20th century, the 'Bellman' character became generic, the jokes were told by schoolchildren, and often related to bodily functions. The jokes have been studied by anthropologists and psychologists since the 1950s.

=== Bellman museum ===
Stora Henriksvik, also called the Bellman museum (Bellmanmuseet) for its small permanent Bellman exhibition, celebrates his life and work with paintings, replica objects and a beachside café in a 17th-century Stockholm house. The place, beside the beach at Långholm, was in Bellman's time called Lilla Sjötullen (The Small Lake-Customs House) where farmers from Lake Mälaren had to pay a toll on the goods they were taking to market in Stockholm's Gamla stan. The place is mentioned in Epistle No. 48, Solen glimmar blank och trind.

=== Bellman society ===
The Bellman Society (Bellmansällskapet), founded in Stockholm on the anniversary of Bellman's birth in 1919, fosters interest in Bellman and supports research into the man and his work. To these ends it organises concerts, lectures, and excursions. It produces the series of Bellmanstudier, starting in 1924, so far running to 24 volumes, as well as facsimile prints of Bellman documents, essay collections, and Yngve Berg's Bellman porcelain. It has published recordings including Alla Fredmans Epistlar (All Fredman's Epistles) and Alla Fredmans Sånger (All Fredman's Songs). The Society's newsletter is called Hwad behagas?. Sister societies in other countries include the Danish Selskabet Bellman i Danmark, and the German Deutsche Bellman-Gesellschaft.

== Works ==
Bellman published the following works:

- Månan (The Moon), Nyström och Stolpe, 1760
- Bacchi Tempel (Temple of Bacchus), 1783
- Fredmans Epistlar (Fredman's Epistles), 1790
- Fredmans Sånger (Fredman's Songs), 1791
- Samlade verk (Collected Works)

== Sources ==
=== English ===
- Britten Austin, Paul (1967). The Life and Songs of Carl Michael Bellman: Genius of the Swedish Rococo. New York: Allhem, Malmö American-Scandinavian Foundation. ISBN 978-3-932759-00-0.
- Britten Austin, Paul (1998). Carl Michael Bellman: Sweden's Shakespeare of the Guitar Song. Stockholm: Proprius.
- Britten Austin, Paul (1999) [1990]. Fredman's Epistles and Songs. Stockholm: Proprius.
- Van Loon, Hendrik Willem; Castagnetta, Grace (1939). The Last of the Troubadours. New York: Simon and Schuster.
- Massengale, James (1979). The Musical-Poetic Method of Carl Michael Bellman. PhD thesis, self-published. ISBN 978-9-15540-849-7.
- Roberts, Michael (1984). Epistles and Songs (three volumes). Grahamstown.
- Stork, Charles Wharton (1917). Anthology of Swedish lyrics from 1750 to 1915. New York: The American-Scandinavian Foundation.

=== Swedish ===
Sources

- Hassler, Göran (1989). Bellman – en antologi [Bellman – an anthology] (in Swedish). Peter Dahl (illus.). En bok för alla. ISBN 91-7448-742-6.
- Hägg, Göran (1996). Den svenska litteraturhistorien [History of Swedish literature] (in Swedish). Stockholm: Wahlström & Widstrand. ISBN 91-46-17629-2.
- Kleveland, Åse; Ehrén, Svenolov (1984). Fredmans epistlar & sånger [The songs and epistles of Fredman] (in Swedish). Stockholm: Informationsförlaget. ISBN 91-7736-059-1. (with facsimiles of sheet music from first editions in 1790, 1791)
- Lönnroth, Lars (2005). Ljuva karneval! : om Carl Michael Bellmans diktning [Sweet Carnival! On Carl Michael Bellman's Poetry] (in Swedish). Stockholm: Albert Bonniers Förlag. ISBN 978-91-0-057245-7. OCLC 61881374.

Further reading

- Andersson, Ingvar; Agne Beijer; Bertil Kjellberg; Bo Lindorm (1979). Ny svensk historia – Gustavianskt 1771–1810 [New Swedish history – Gustavian 1771–1810]. Wahlström & Widstrand. ISBN 91-46-13373-9.
- Brunner, Ernst (2002). Fukta din aska [Moisten your ashes]. Bonnier. ISBN 91-0-058026-0.
- Burman, Carina (2019). Bellman. Biografin [Bellman. The Biography]. Stockholm: Albert Bonniers Förlag. ISBN 978-9100141790.
- Eriksson, Lars-Göran, ed. (1982). Kring Bellmann [Around Bellman]. Stockholm: Wahlström & Widstrand. ISBN 91-46-14135-9.
- Henrikson, Alf (1986). Ekot av ett skott – öden kring 1792 [The echo of a shot – life around 1792]. Höganäs: Bra Böcker. ISBN 91-7752-124-2.
- Huldén, Lars (1991). Carl Michael Bellman. Stockholm: Natur & Kultur. ISBN 91-27-03767-3.
- Huldén, Lars; Pettersson, Björn (1961). Om samordning hos Bellman / Lars Huldén. Nominal statsbildning i Mikael Lybecks prosa / Björn Pettersson (in Swedish). Helsinki: Swedish Literature Society in Finland. Archived from the original on 15 August 2022.
- Jonshult, Bengt Gustaf (1990). Med Bellman på Haga och Carlberg [With Bellman at Haga and Carlberg]. Solna: Solna Hembygdsförening. ISBN 91-971109-1-4.
- Matz, Edvard (2004). Carl Michael Bellman – Nymfer och friskt kalas [Carl Michael Bellman – Nymphs and splendid feasts]. Lund: Historiska Media. ISBN 91-89442-97-0.
- Hjord, Bengt, ed. (1989). ""Carl Michael Bellmans okända släkt" by Marianne Nyström pp. 209-226 and "Skalde-Anor: Carl Michael Bellmans härstammning" by Håkan Skogsjö pp. 227-236". Stadsbor i gångna tider: Släktforskaren och staden: Årsbok 1989 [City dwellers in olden times: The genealogist and the town]. Stockholm: Sveriges Släktforskarförbund, Norstedts Tryckeri. ISBN 91-87676-03-6.
