= Hvila vid denna källa =

Song by the 18th century Swedish bard Carl Michael Bellman

- Art song
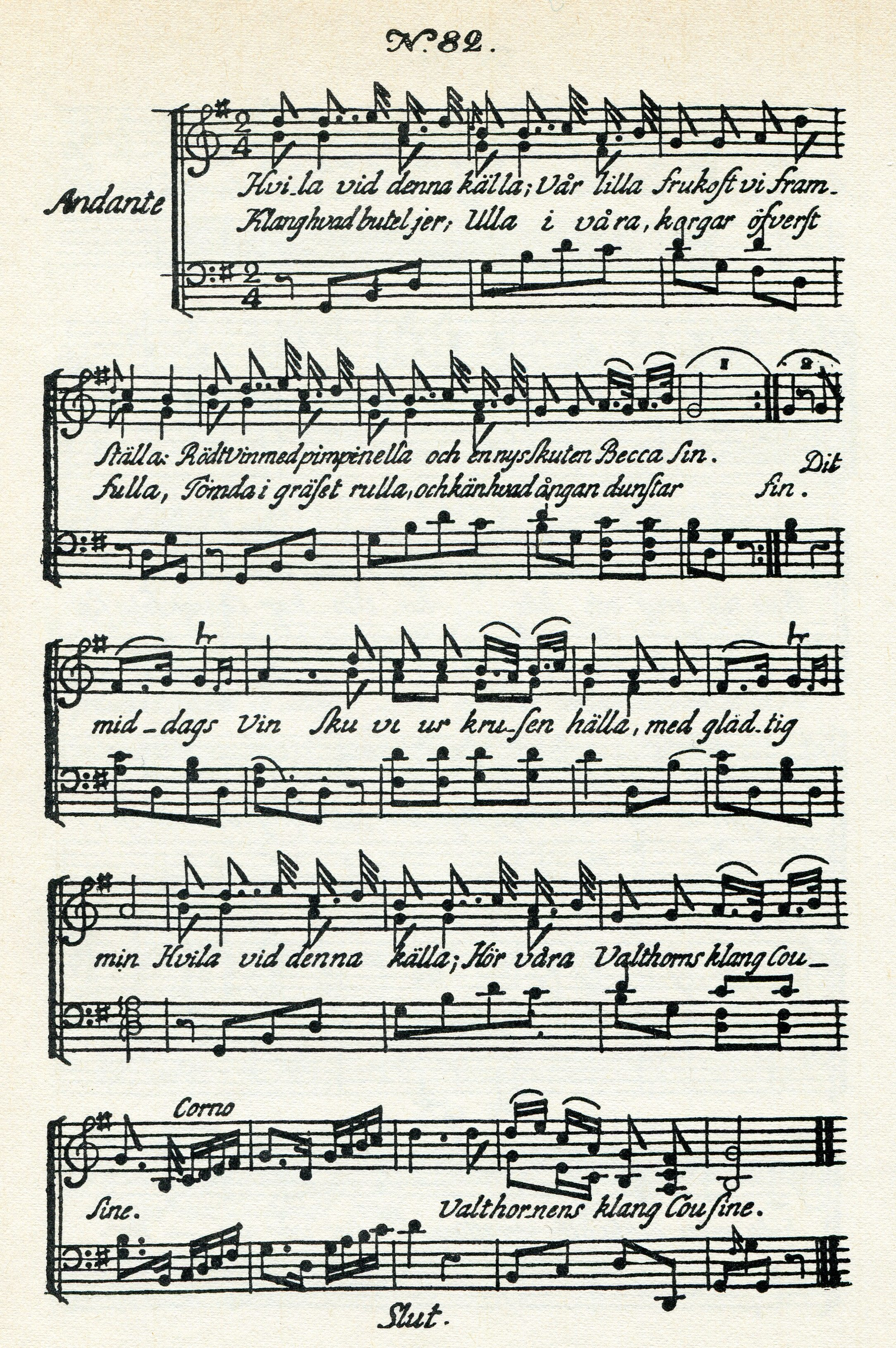
- Sheet music
- English: Rest by this spring
- Written: 1790
- Text: poem by Carl Michael Bellman
- Language: Swedish
- Published: 1790 in Fredman's Epistles
- Scoring: voice and cittern

Hvila vid denna källa (in modern Swedish "Vila ...", Rest by this spring) is a song by the Swedish poet and performer Carl Michael Bellman from his 1790 collection, Fredman's Epistles, where it is No. 82, the final Epistle. It is subtitled "Eller Oförmodade avsked, förkunnat vid Ulla Winblads frukost en sommarmorgon i det gröna. Pastoral dedicerad till Kgl. Sekreteraren Leopoldt" ("Or unexpected parting, proclaimed at Ulla Winblad's breakfast one summer morning in the countryside. Pastoral dedicated to the Royal Secretary Leopoldt"). It depicts the Rococo muse Ulla Winblad, as the narrator offers a "little breakfast" of "red wine with burnet, and a newly-shot snipe" in a pastoral setting in the Stockholm countryside.

The popular song, described as one of Sweden's best-loved, has been used in at least 16 Swedish films. Its melody appears to be one of the few, possibly the only one, composed by Bellman. In the song's last stanza, the dying Bellman, in words attributed to the dying Fredman, says farewell.

== Context ==
Carl Michael Bellman is a central figure in the Swedish ballad tradition and a powerful influence in Swedish music, known for his 1790 Fredman's Epistles and his 1791 Fredman's Songs. A solo entertainer, he played the cittern, accompanying himself as he performed his songs at the royal court.

Jean Fredman (1712 or 1713–1767) was a real watchmaker of Bellman's Stockholm. The fictional Fredman, alive after 1767, but without employment, is the supposed narrator in Bellman's epistles and songs. The epistles, written and performed in different styles, from drinking songs and laments to pastorales, paint a complex picture of the life of the city during the 18th century. A frequent theme is the demimonde, with Fredman's cheerfully drunk Order of Bacchus, a loose company of ragged men who favour strong drink and prostitutes. At the same time as depicting this realist side of life, Bellman creates a rococo picture, full of classical allusion, following the French post-Baroque poets. The women, including the beautiful Ulla Winblad, are "nymphs", while Neptune's festive troop of followers and sea-creatures sport in Stockholm's waters. The juxtaposition of elegant and low life is humorous, sometimes burlesque, but always graceful and sympathetic. The songs are "most ingeniously" set to their music, which is nearly always borrowed and skilfully adapted.

== Song ==
=== Melody and verse form ===
Melody of Epistle 82
Melody used for this and two other songs by Bellman

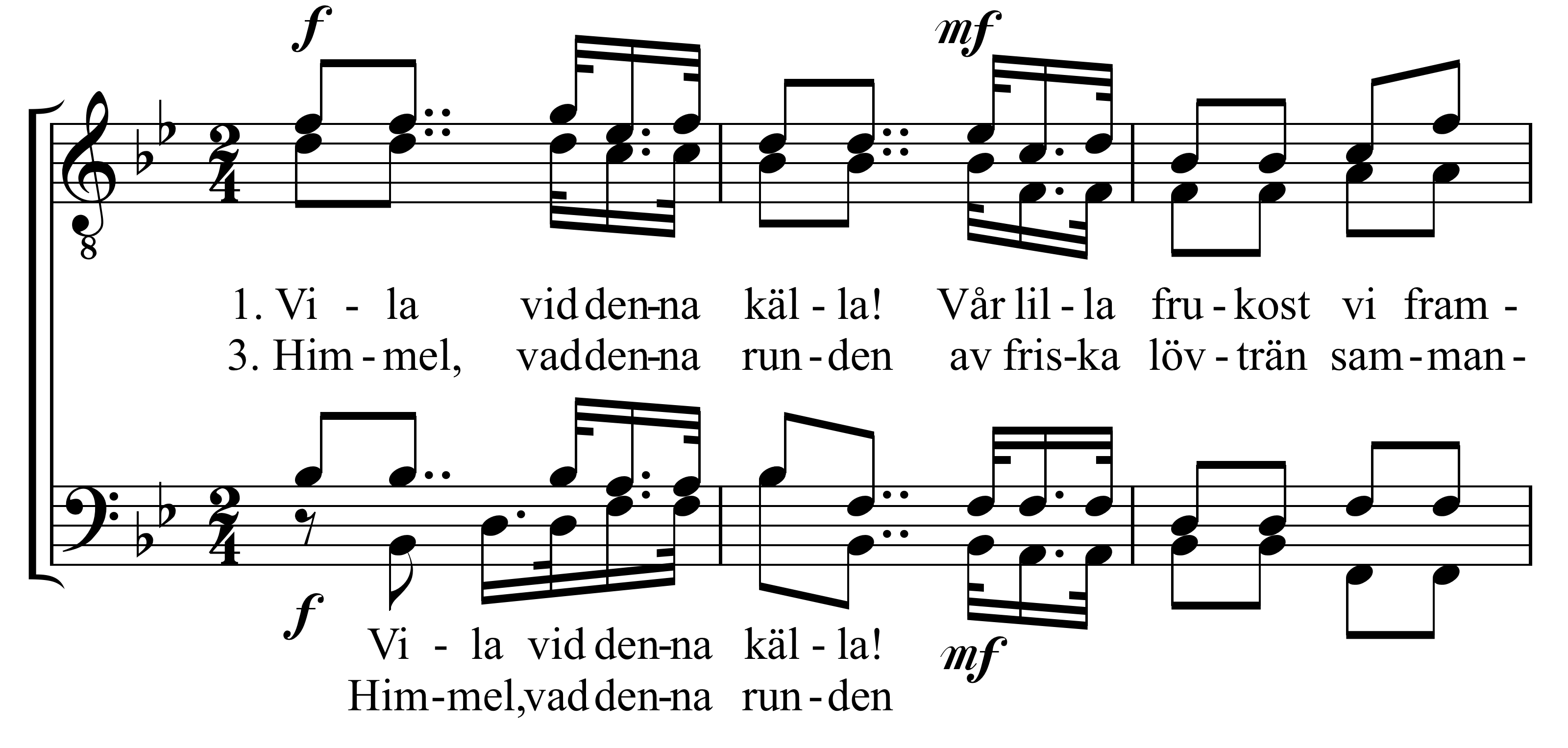
Arrangement for four-part male choir in B-flat major by Johan Peter Cronhamn (1803–1875)

The song is in 2/4 time, marked Andante. It has six verses, each consisting of 14 lines, the end of the last line being repeated after a Corno interlude. The verses have the rhyming pattern AAAB-CCCB-BABABB. The origin of the melody is disputed, and it may well have been one of the very few of Fredman's Epistles (perhaps the only one) composed by Bellman himself, apparently in 1790, making it one of the last to be written. Afzelius noted that the melody resembles that of Epistle 25, "Blåsen nu alla"; this would involve a change from 3/4 to 2/4 time, which Bellman is known to have been skilful at. Hildebrand argued that the melody was Bellman's; Olof Åhlström wrote that it must have been borrowed from an unknown source. Bellman set two other songs, "Skåden den lugna stranden" (See the calm shore) and "Hjertat det kännes klappa" (The heart is felt beating) to the same melody.

=== Lyrics ===
The first stanza, in verse and prose
Carl Michael Bellman,
1790

Hvila vid denna källa,
Vår lilla Frukost vi framställa:
Rödt Vin med Pimpinella
Och en nyss skuten Beccasin. (Note: The French word for Snipe.)
Klang hvad Buteljer, Ulla!
I våra Korgar öfverstfulla,
Tömda i gräset rulla,
Och känn hvad ångan dunstar fin,
Ditt middags Vin
Sku vi ur krusen hälla,
Med glättig min.
Hvila vid denna källa,
Hör våra Valdthorns klang Cousine.
Valdthornens klang Cousine.

Eva Toller's prose,
2004

Rest by this spring,
we set forth our little breakfast:
red wine with burnet
and a recently killed snipe.
What clinking bottles, Ulla,
in our hampers, crammed full,
that, emptied, roll in the grass,
and smell the fuming vapour!
Gladly we will pour (Note: The order of phrases is varied here.)
your dinner wine
from these pitchers.
Rest by this spring,
harken to the sound of our French horns, cousine! (Note: French: female cousin.)
The sound of the French horns, cousine!

Hendrik Willem Van Loon's verse,
1939

Come, love, and rest a while now,
Our breakfast we shall spread 'neath leafy bough.
Red wine and pimpinelle,
And then some game that nothing can surpass.
Right now's the time for drinking
A toast to Ulla I'm a thinking.
Full once, the basket's shrinking,
The empty bottles roll now in the grass.
Your dinner wine,
Straight from the jug we'll pour,
I trow You'll not decline.
Come, love, and rest a while now,
And to the horn's bright call thy ear incline.
And to the call thy ear incline.

Paul Britten Austin's verse,
1977

Come now, ourselves reposing,
A breakfast round this spring disposing;
Ulla, red wine disclosing,
A pheasant lays out on the green.
Empty upon the grasses
What press of bottles and of glasses!
To each swain our Ulla passes
His brimming cup, with bouquet keen.
Ah, naught, I ween,
but glad and cheerful faces
Around are seen.
Come now, ourselves reposing,
And hark to waldhorn's cry, cousine!
corno: ~ ~ ~ Hark, waldhorn's cry, cousine!

== Reception and legacy ==
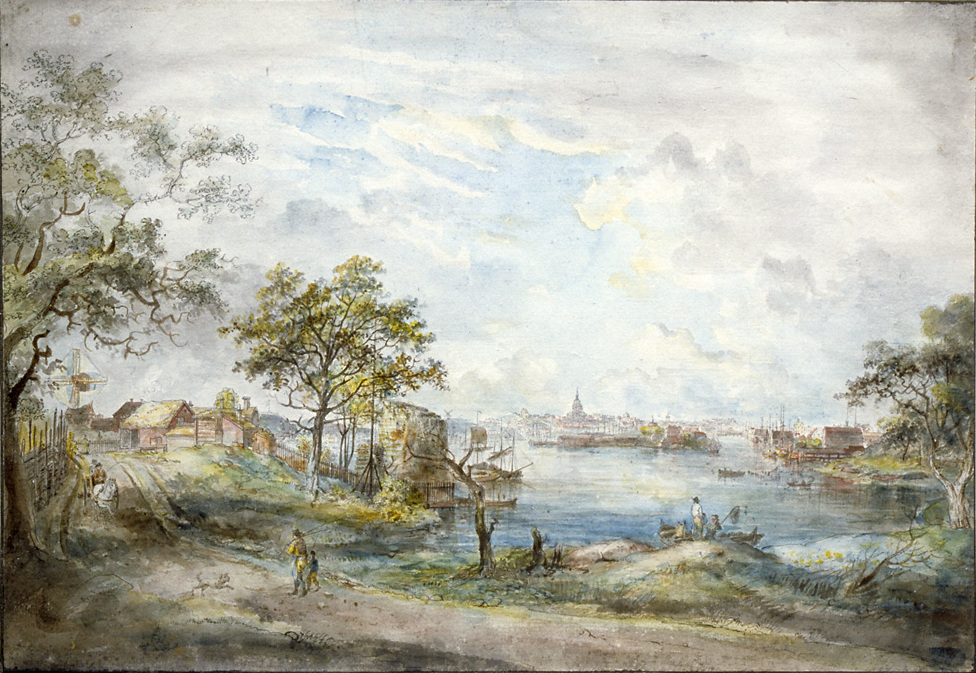
Rest by this spring: the view towards Stockholm from Djurgården in Bellman's time. Watercolour by Elias Martin, c. 1790

Carina Burman writes in her biography of Bellman that Fredman does finally say goodbye in this, the last Epistle, as the subtitle ("An unexpected departure...") makes clear, as does the final stanza:

Äntlig i detta gröna, Får du mitt sista afsked röna; Ulla! farväl min Sköna, Vid alla Instrumenters ljud.

Finally in this greenery, you'll hear my last farewell; Ulla! adieu my lovely, to the sound of all the instruments.

Indeed, Burman notes, the Epistle represents Bellman's dying words as well as Fredman's, and perhaps Ulla Winblad's too; at least, she certainly dies in one sense, (Note: "Stod Ulla sista gången brud" (Ulla played bride for the final time) meaning she had her final "little death" (orgasm), or that she actually dies.) and perhaps in the other as well; Bellman knew that he was writing his last Epistles. All the same, Burman remarks, the song is a bright counterpart to the farewell of Epistle 79, with Ulla's beauty, green grass and music instead of apocalypse. The Epistle's pastoral tone and descriptions of food are to an extent anticipated, writes Burman, in Bellman's longest poem, Bacchi Tempel, which mentions exotic imports such as melon and Parmesan.

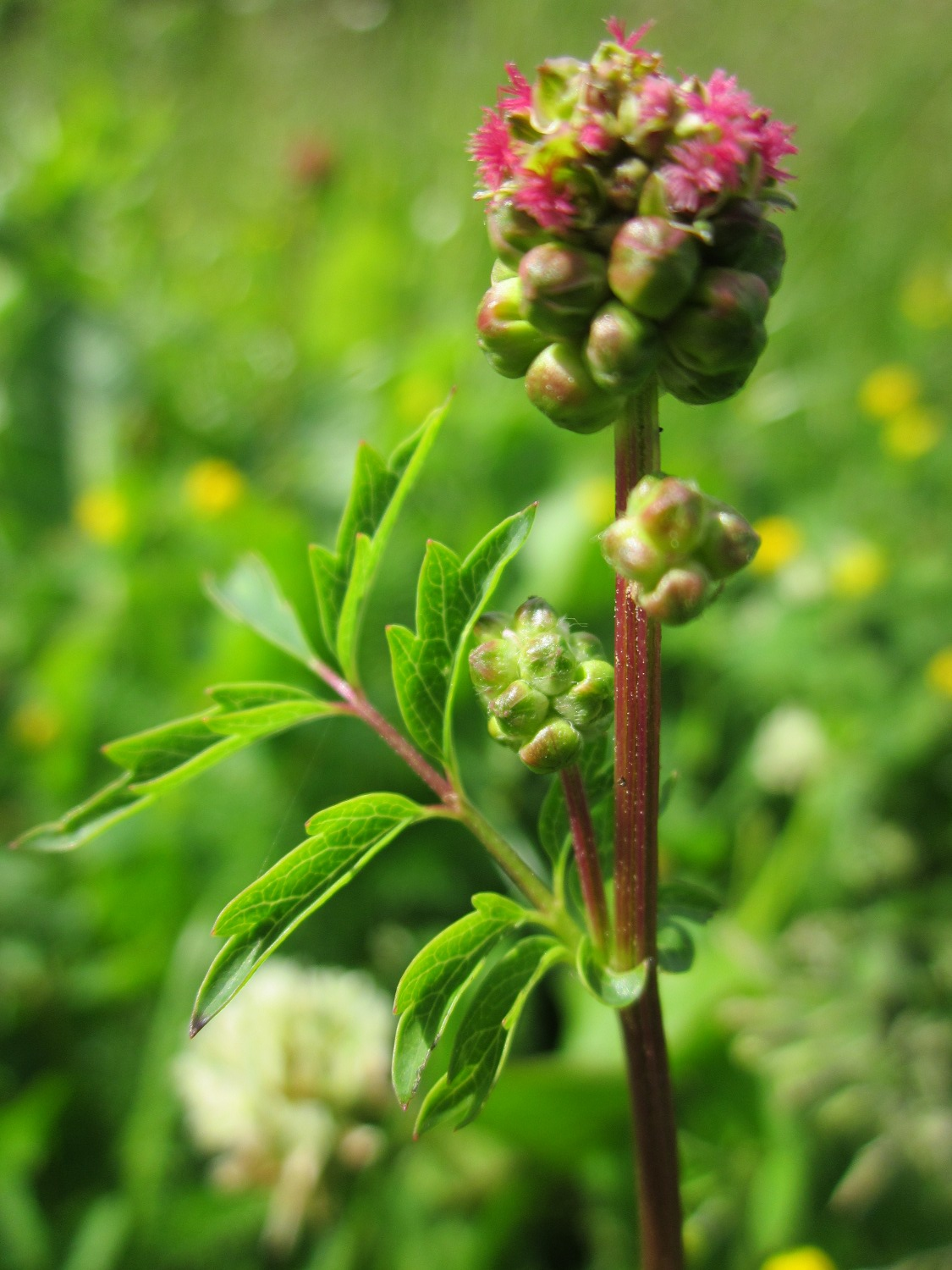
The pimpinella used to flavour wine in the song may well have been Sanguisorba minor, salad burnet.

Lars Lönnroth, writing in Svenska Dagbladet, suggests that the "spring" in the Epistle was in fact not a stream in summer meadows but a fashionable spa, perhaps Djurgårsbrunn on what was in Bellman's time the edge of Stockholm.

Henrik Mickos, in the 2011 Bellman lecture, discussed what the "pimpinella" of the first verse might be, concluding that salad burnet (Sanguisorba minor) was quite likely, given it was known at the time as pimpinella, and was more common in Sweden then than in the 21st century. Mickos dismisses the possibility that it was aniseed (Pimpinella anisum), which was used to flavour brännvin but not as the song has it ("red wine and pimpinella") a wine-based punch.

Epistle 82 has appeared in at least 16 Swedish films from 1929 onwards. It is included in the 1894 Danish High School Songbook. It has been described as one of Sweden's best-loved songs. It has been recorded by Fred Åkerström, as the title track of his third album of Bellman interpretations in 1977. An earlier performance by the noted Bellman interpreter Sven-Bertil Taube on his Fredmans Epistlar och Sånger, recorded 1959–1963, was re-released on an EMI-Svenska CD in 1983. The Epistle has been translated into English by Eva Toller.

== Sources ==
- Bellman, Carl Michael (1790). Fredmans epistlar. Stockholm: By Royal Privilege.
- Britten Austin, Paul (1967). The Life and Songs of Carl Michael Bellman: Genius of the Swedish Rococo. New York: Allhem, Malmö American-Scandinavian Foundation. ISBN 978-3-932759-00-0.
- Britten Austin, Paul (1977). Fredman's Epistles and Songs. Stockholm: Reuter and Reuter. OCLC 5059758.
- Burman, Carina (2019). Bellman. Biografin [Bellman: The Biography] (in Swedish). Stockholm: Albert Bonniers Förlag. ISBN 978-9100141790.
- Hassler, Göran; Dahl, Peter (illus.) (1989). Bellman – en antologi [Bellman – an anthology] (in Swedish). En bok för alla. ISBN 91-7448-742-6. (contains the most popular Epistles and Songs, in Swedish, with sheet music)
- Kleveland, Åse; Ehrén, Svenolov (illus.) (1984). Fredmans epistlar & sånger [The songs and epistles of Fredman] (in Swedish). Stockholm: Informationsförlaget. ISBN 91-7736-059-1. (with facsimiles of sheet music from first editions in 1790, 1791)
- Massengale, James Rhea (1979). The Musical-Poetic Method of Carl Michael Bellman. Stockholm: Almqvist & Wiksell International. ISBN 91-554-0849-4.
- Van Loon, Hendrik Willem; Castagnetta, Grace (1939). The Last of the Troubadours. New York: Simon & Schuster.
