= Fredmans epistlar =

Book of songs by Carl Michael Bellman

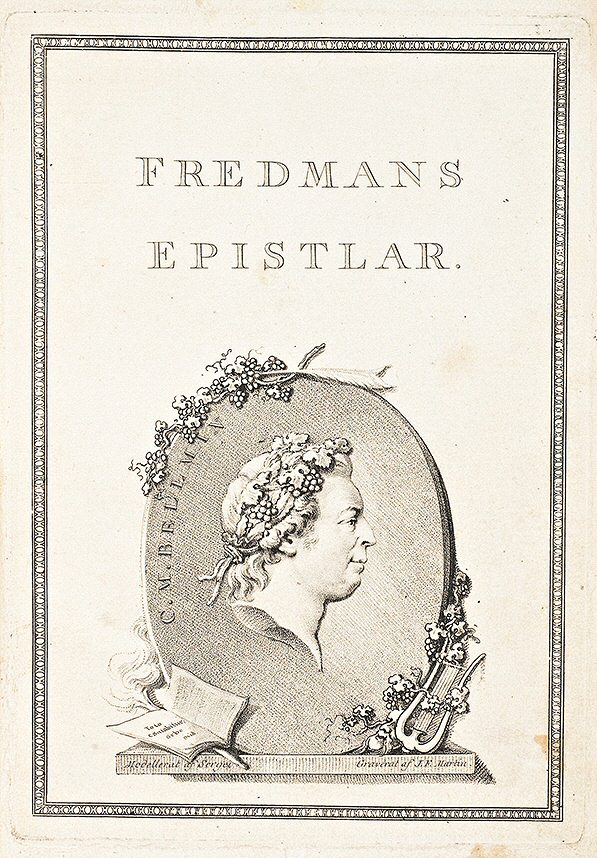
- Frontispiece to the first edition by Johan Tobias Sergel, engraved by Johan Fredrik Martin (Note: The open book at lower left is inscribed toto cantabitur orbe, ("will be celebrated in poetry in the whole world"), from Ovid's Amores, 1.15.)
- Author: Carl Michael Bellman
- Subject: Song
- Genre: Rococo, pastorale, parody, drinking: it 'had no model and can have no successors' (Kellgren)
- Publisher: Olof Åhlström, by Royal Privilege
- Publication date: 1790
- Publication place: Sweden
- Pages: 391

Fredmans epistlar (English: Fredman's Epistles) is a collection of 82 poems set to music by Carl Michael Bellman, a major figure in Swedish 18th century song. Though first published in 1790, it was created over a period of twenty years from 1768 onwards. A companion volume, Fredmans sånger (Fredman's Songs) was published the following year.

The Epistles vary widely in style and effect, from Rococo-themed pastorale with a cast of gods and demigods from classical antiquity to laments for the effects of Brännvin-drinking, tavern-scenes, and apparent improvisations. The lyrics, based on the lives of Bellman's contemporaries in Gustavian-age Sweden, describe a gallery of fictional and semi-fictional characters and events in Stockholm. Jean Fredman, an alcoholic former watchmaker, is the central character and fictional narrator. The "soliloquy" of Epistle 23, a description of Fredman lying drunk in the gutter and then recovering in the Crawl-In Tavern, was described by Oscar Levertin as "the to-be-or-not-to-be of Swedish literature". Ulla Winblad, based on one of Bellman's friends, is the chief of the fictional "nymphs". She is half goddess, half prostitute, a key figure among the demimonde characters of Fredman's Epistles.

The Epistles are admired for the way that their poetry and music fit so well together. Bellman chose not to compose the tunes, instead borrowing and adapting existing melodies, most likely to exploit the humour of contrasting the associations of well-known tunes with the meanings he gave them. This may also have been intended to provide historical depth to his work; he sometimes devoted considerable energy to adapting melodies to fit an Epistle's needs.

Many of the Epistles have remained culturally significant in Scandinavia, especially in Sweden. They are widely sung and recorded: by choirs such as the Orphei Drängar, by professional solo singers such as Fred Åkerström and Cornelis Vreeswijk, and by ensemble singers such as Sven-Bertil Taube and William Clauson. The Epistles have been translated into German, French, English, Russian, Polish, Finnish, Italian and Dutch.

== Overview ==
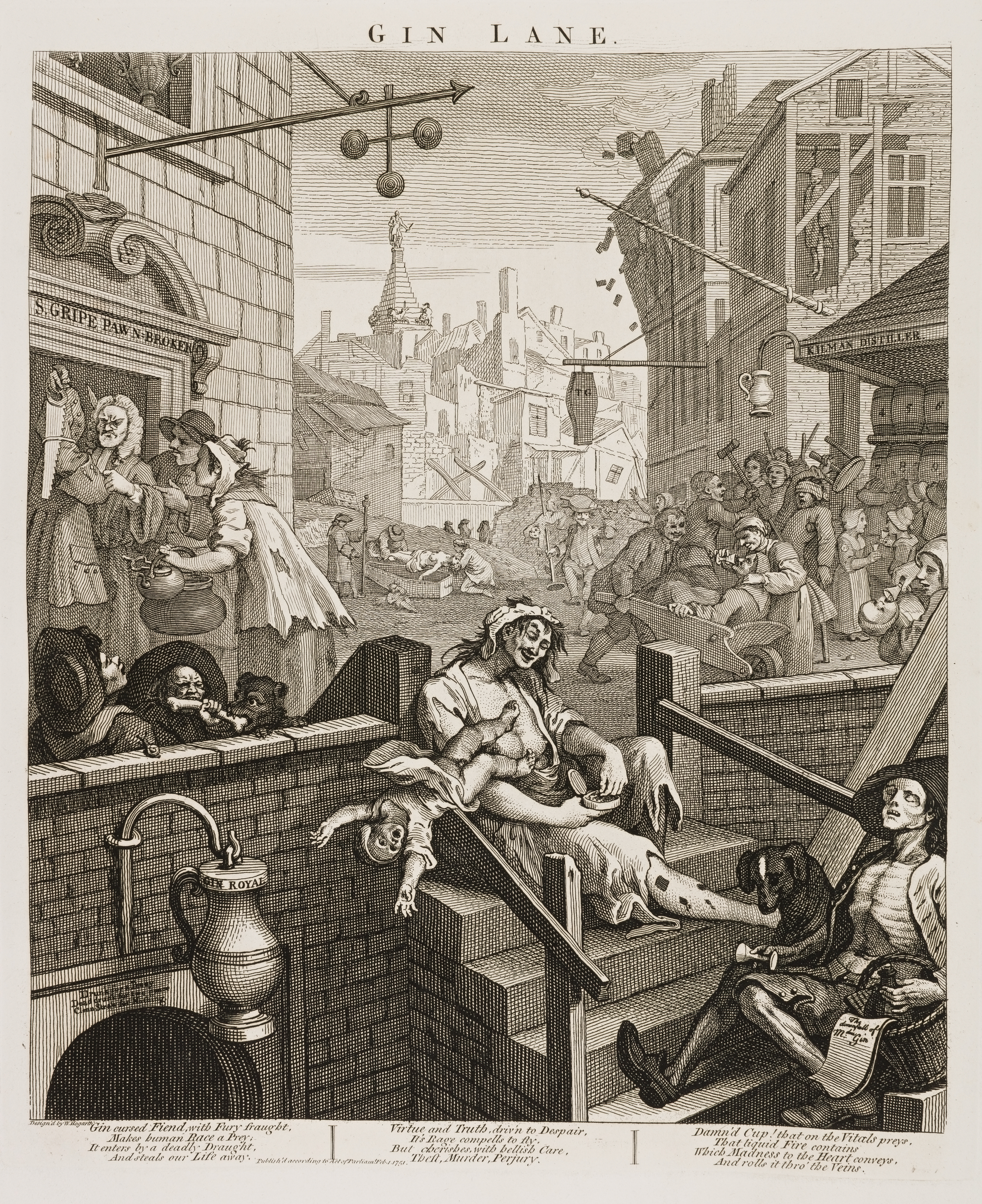
Bellman's artistry in the songs of Fredman's Epistles has been compared with William Hogarth's work as a painter, as here in Gin Lane, 1751.

Bellman wrote a total of 82 Fredman's Epistles, starting in 1768. The overall theme of the Epistles is, on the surface, drinking, and its effects, but the Epistles are very far from being drinking songs. Instead, they are a diverse collection of songs, often telling stories. They are sometimes romantically pastoral, sometimes serious, even mournful, but always dramatic, full of life. Together, they "paint in words and music a canvas of their age". They are populated by a lengthy cast of characters, and set firmly in Bellman's time and place, eighteenth century Stockholm, but are simultaneously decorated, for romantic or humorous effect, in Rococo style. As a result, listeners are confronted with both striking realism and classical imagery. Within these general themes, the Epistles follow no discernible pattern, and do not join to tell any single story. Their tunes, too, are borrowed from a variety of sources, often French. The words that are fitted to the tunes are often in parodic contrast to their original themes, very likely achieving humorous effects on their eighteenth-century audiences. Fredman's Epistles are thus not easy to categorise; the critic Johan Henric Kellgren stated that Bellman's songs "had no model and can have no successors".

Bellman was a skilful and entertaining performer of his songs, accompanying himself on the cittern, putting on different voices, and imitating the sounds made by a crowd of people. He is unusual, even unique, among major poets in that almost all of his work was "conceived to music". His achievement has been compared to Shakespeare, Beethoven, Mozart, and Hogarth. Bellman, however, was no great playwright, nor a major classical composer. His biographer, Paul Britten Austin, suggests that the comparison with Hogarth is closer to the mark. Bellman had a gift for using elegant classical references in comic contrast to the sordid realities of drinking and prostitution. The way he does this, at once regretting and celebrating these excesses in song, achieves something of what Hogarth achieved in engravings and paint. The art historian Axel Romdahl describes Bellman's sensibility as if he had been a painter: "An unusual swiftness of apprehension, both optical and aural, must have distinguished him." Britten Austin agrees with this, noting that "When [Bellman's] words and music have faded into silence it is the visual image which remains." Jan Sjåvik comments in the Historical Dictionary of Scandinavian Literature and Theater that "Bellman's achievement consists in taking this humble and unrecognized literary form [the drinking song] and raising it to a genre that became impossible to ignore, while in the process creating songs and characters that have become an indispensable part of Sweden's literary and cultural heritage."

== The Epistles ==
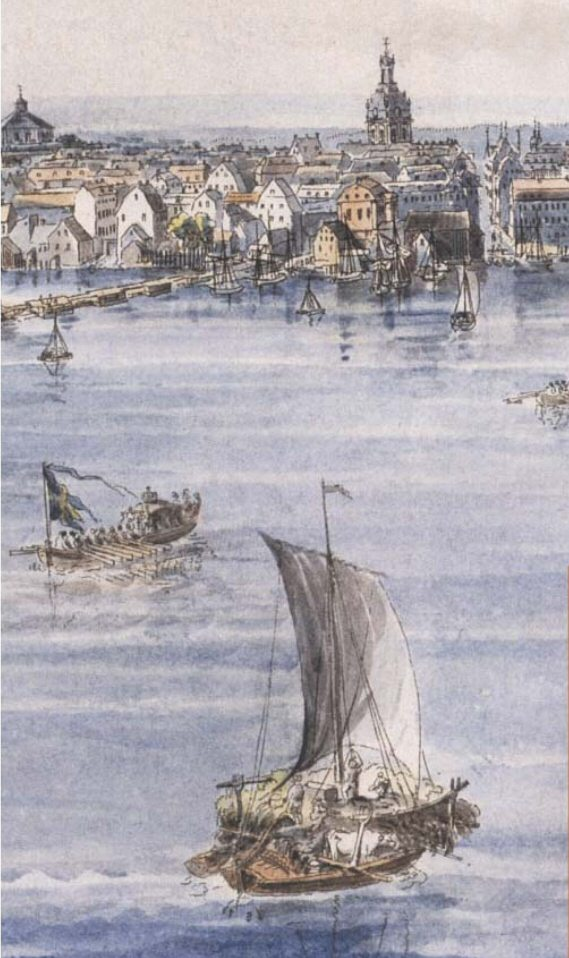
Detail of watercolour by Johan Fredrik Martin of a scene reminiscent of Ulla Winblad's journey back from Lake Mälaren to Stockholm in Epistle No. 48, Solen glimmar blank och trind

Many of the 82 Fredman's Epistles remain popular in Sweden. Their diverse styles and themes may be illustrated with examples of some of the best-known songs. To begin with No. 23, Ack du min Moder! (Alas, thou my mother), which has been described as "the to-be-or-not-to-be of Swedish literature", tells, in realist style, the story of a drunk who wakes in a Stockholm gutter outside the Crawl-In Tavern. He curses his parents for conceiving him "perhaps upon a table" as he looks at his torn clothes. Then the tavern door opens, and he goes in and has his first drink. The song ends with loud thanks to the drunk's mother and father. In contrast, the Rococo No. 28, I går såg jag ditt barn, min Fröja (Yesterday I saw thy child, my Freya), tells the tale of an attempt to arrest the "nymph" Ulla Winblad, based on a real event. Bellman here combines realism – Ulla wearing a black embroidered bodice, and losing her watch in a named street (Yxsmedsgränd) in Stockholm's Gamla stan – with images from classical mythology, such as a myrtle crown and an allusion to the goddess Aphrodite.

Quite a different tone is set in No. 40, Ge rum i Bröllops-gåln din hund! (Make room in the wedding-hall, you dog!), as some unruly soldiers interfere in a chaotic wedding, mixing roughly with the musicians and the wedding-party. Shouts of "Shoulder arms!" and panic at a chimney fire combine with a complex rhyming pattern to create a humorous picture of the disastrous event. The story ends with the priest pocketing some of the collection money. A later Epistle, No. 48, Solen glimmar blank och trind (The sun gleams smooth and round), narrates the relaxed and peaceful journey of a boat bringing Ulla Winblad home to Stockholm across Lake Mälaren on a lovely spring morning, after a night of carousing. The boatmen call to each other, apparently haphazardly, but each detail helps to create a pastoral vision as "Gradually the wind blows up / In the fallen sails; / The pennant stretches, and with an oar / Olle stands on a hayboat;". The song is "one of Bellman's greatest", creating "an incomparable panorama of that eighteenth-century Stockholm which meets us in Elias Martin's canvasses."

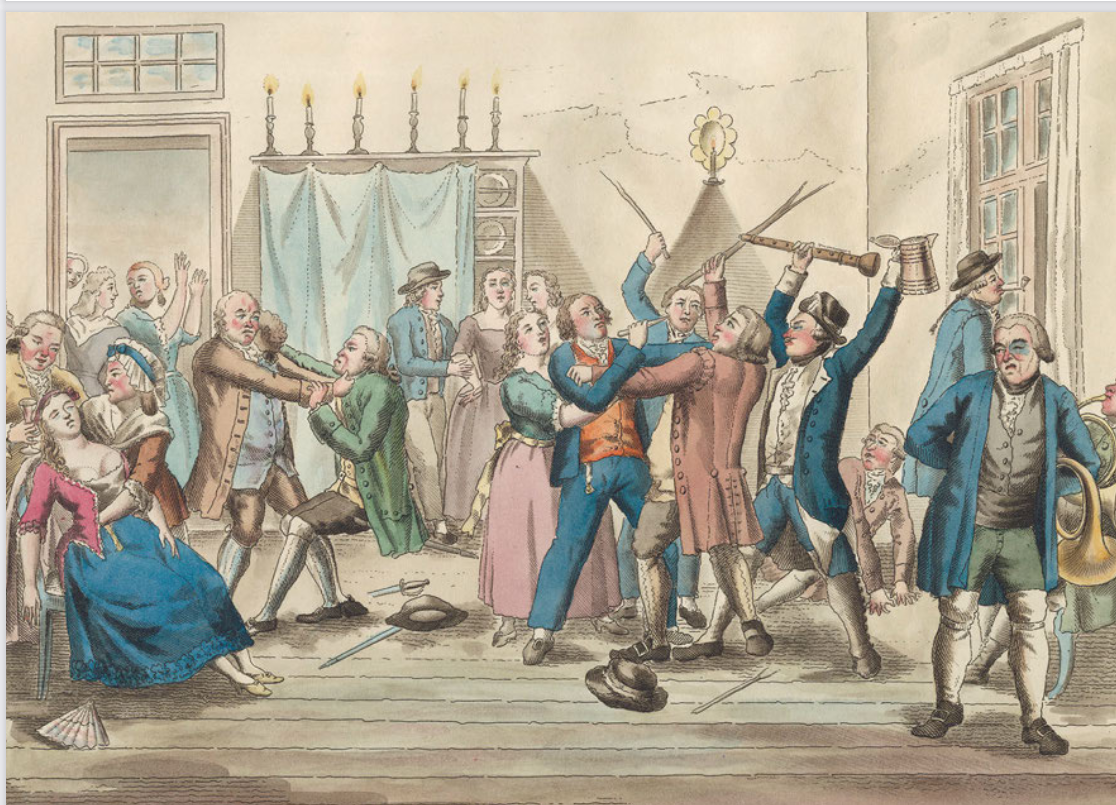
A drinking session descends into a brawl. Illustration for Fredman's Epistle no. 64 ("On the last ball at Fröman's tavern on Horns-Kroken") by Elis Chiewitz, 1827

Bellman had stopped composing Epistles by 1781; he started again by the end of the decade, composing seven of his finest works around 1789 to 1790: Epistles 70, 71, 77, 80, 81, 82, and revising Epistle 72 which he had written in 1772. The musicologist James Massengale calls this "an impressive group, containing several of the [most] popular Bellman favorites of all time, as well as some of his most complex and intriguing works of art". He adds that the sources of their melodies are mostly unknown, leading some to suggest that Bellman composed the melodies rather than following his usual habit of modifying well-known existing tunes.

No. 71, Ulla! min Ulla! säj får jag dig bjuda (Ulla! My Ulla! Say, may I offer thee) is another of the best-loved pastoral Epistles, and the melody may well be by Bellman himself. It imagines how Fredman, sitting on horseback outside Ulla's window at Fiskartorpet on a summer's day, invites her to come and dine with him on "reddest strawberries in milk and wine". The following Epistle, No. 72, Glimmande nymf (Gleaming nymph), is a night-piece, set to an Andante melody from a French opéra comique. It describes in erotic detail the "nymph" asleep in her bed. To create the desired mood of rising excitement, Bellman creates a rainbow — after sunset. Britten Austin comments that the audience "does not even notice". Meanwhile, No. 80, Liksom en Herdinna, högtids klädd (Like a shepherdess in her best dress), is a pastorale, almost paraphrasing Nicolas Boileau-Despréaux's French guide to the construction of pastoral verse, starting with "As a Shepherdess splendidly dressed / By the spring one day in June / gathers from the grass's rosy bed / adornments and accents for her dress". The effect is of an "almost religious invocation".

The final Epistle, No. 82, Hvila vid denna källa (Rest by this spring), is both pastoral and Rococo, depicting a "little breakfast" in the Stockholm countryside. Red wine flows; there is roast chicken, and an almond tart. Flowers "of a thousand kinds" are all around; a stallion parades in a field "with his mare and foal"; a bull roars; a cockerel hops on the roof, and a magpie chatters. Meanwhile, the musicians are exhorted to blow along with the wind god Eol, small love-sprites are asked to sing, and Ulla is called a nymph. The final chorus asks everyone to drink their dram of brandy.

== Cast of characters ==
The lyrics of the Epistles describe a gallery of fictional and semi-fictional characters who take part in more or less real events in and around the Stockholm of Bellman's time. This cast includes some 44 named personages, many of whom appear only once or twice. Some, like the principal characters Jean Fredman and Ulla Winblad, are based on real people, and in Fredman's case his real name was used. The Fredman of the Epistles is an alcoholic former watchmaker, and is the central character and fictional narrator. He is thus supposedly present in all the Epistles, but is only named in a few of them. The backdrop of many of the Epistles, Stockholm's taverns, is also frequented by musicians including Christian Wingmark on flute, Father Berg on various instruments, Father Movitz, and the dance master Corporal Mollberg.

A particular group is the Order of Bacchus (Bacchi Orden): to become a member, one must be seen lying in a drunken stupor in a Stockholm gutter at least twice. Among the more minor characters is the brandy-distiller Lundholm. Another is Norström, Ulla Winblad's husband; the real Eric Nordström did in fact marry the "real Ulla Winblad", Maria Kristina Kiellström, a silk-spinner and fallen woman made pregnant by a passing nobleman. In the Epistles, Ulla Winblad is the chief of the "nymphs". She is half goddess, half prostitute, chief among the demimonde characters of the Epistles.

Illustrations by Elis Chiewitz

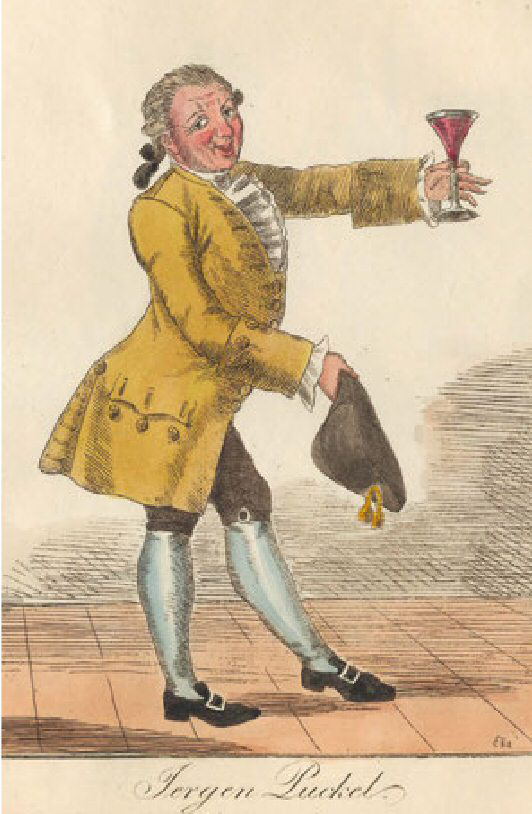
Jergen Puckel

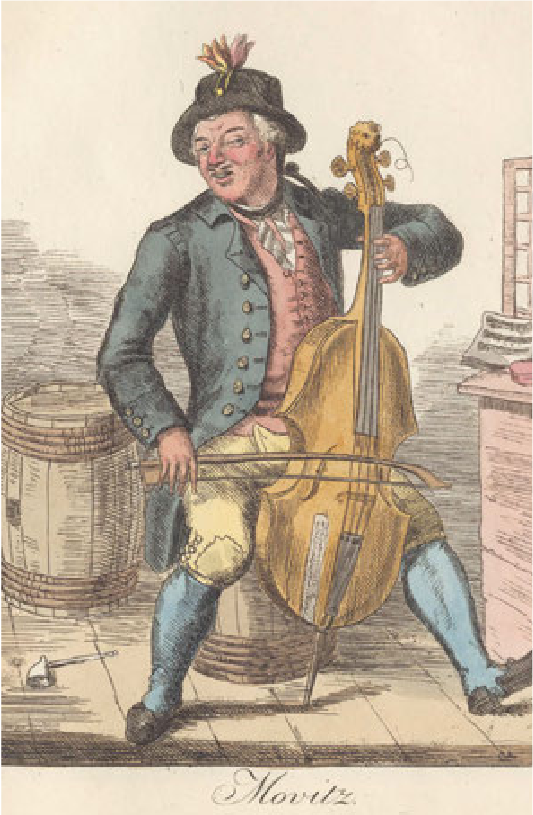
Movitz

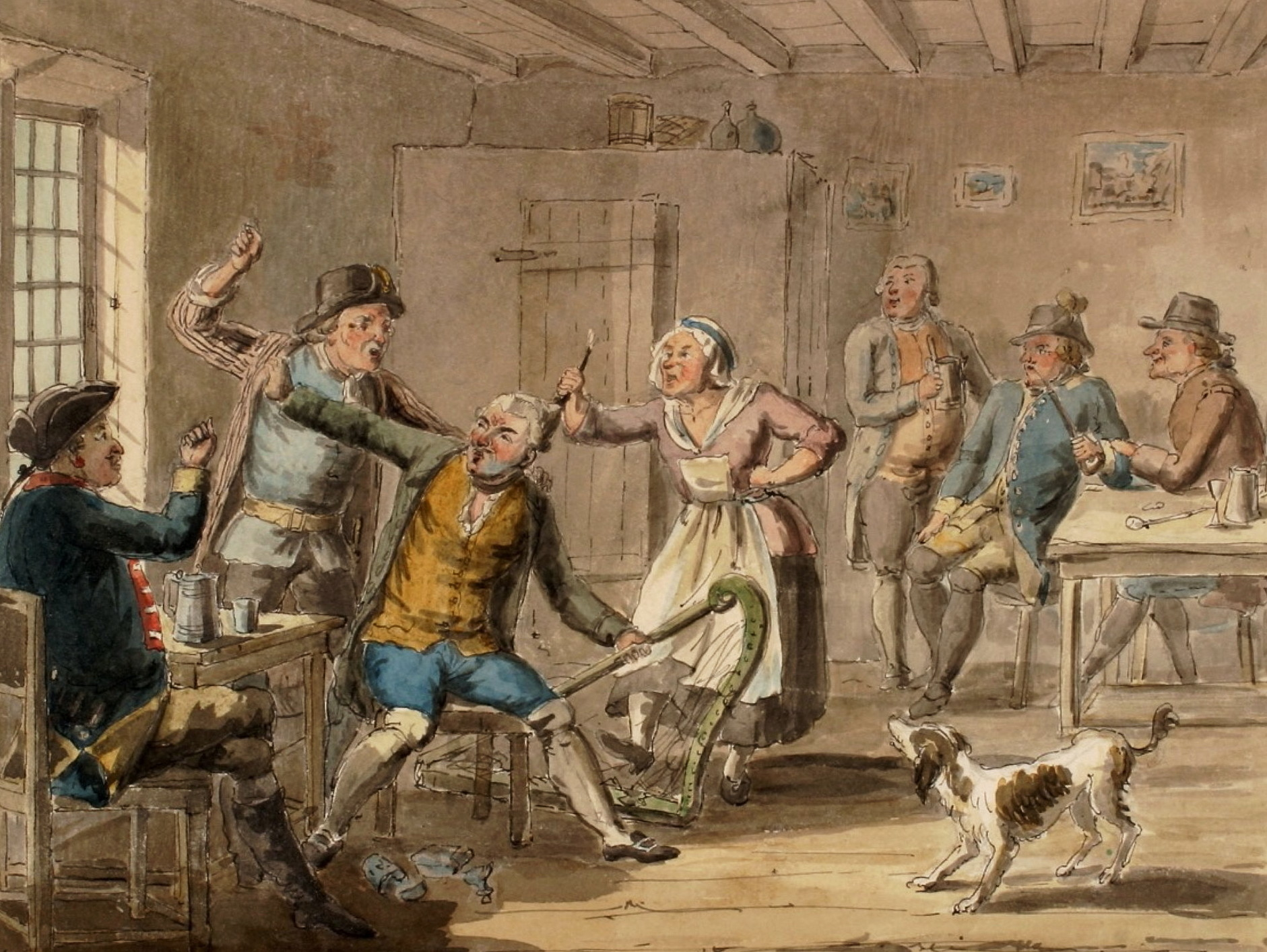
Ep. 45: Mollberg is beaten, his harp broken in the Rostock tavern

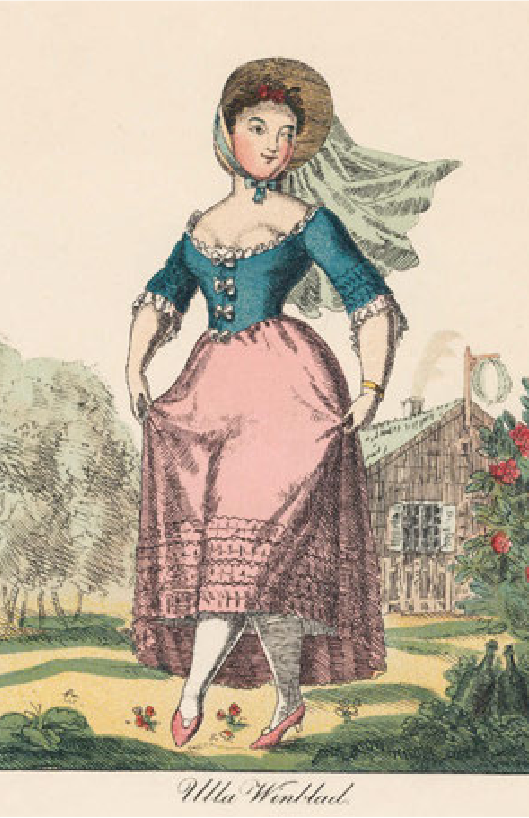
Ulla Winblad

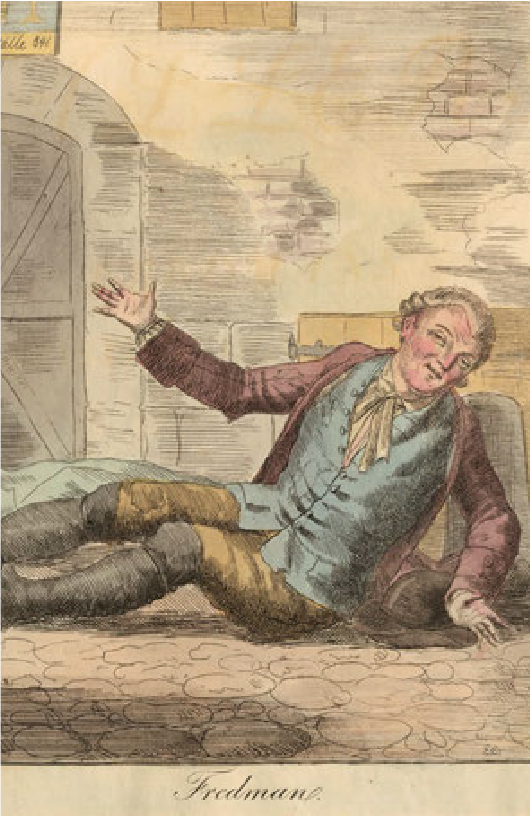
Fredman

== Rococo theme ==
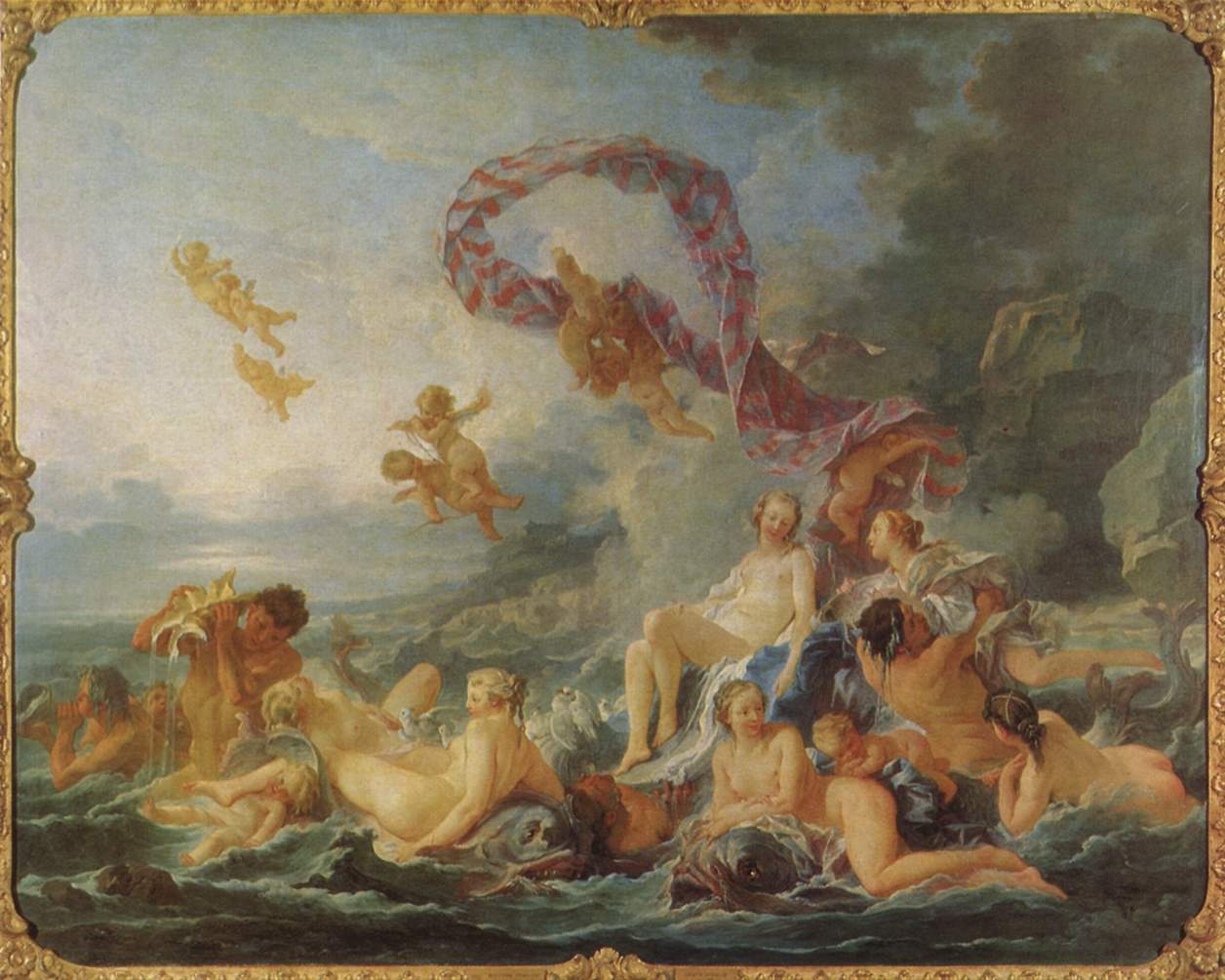
François Boucher's 1740 painting Triumph of Venus, the model for the humorously Rococo Epistle 25, "Blåsen nu alla (All blow now!)"

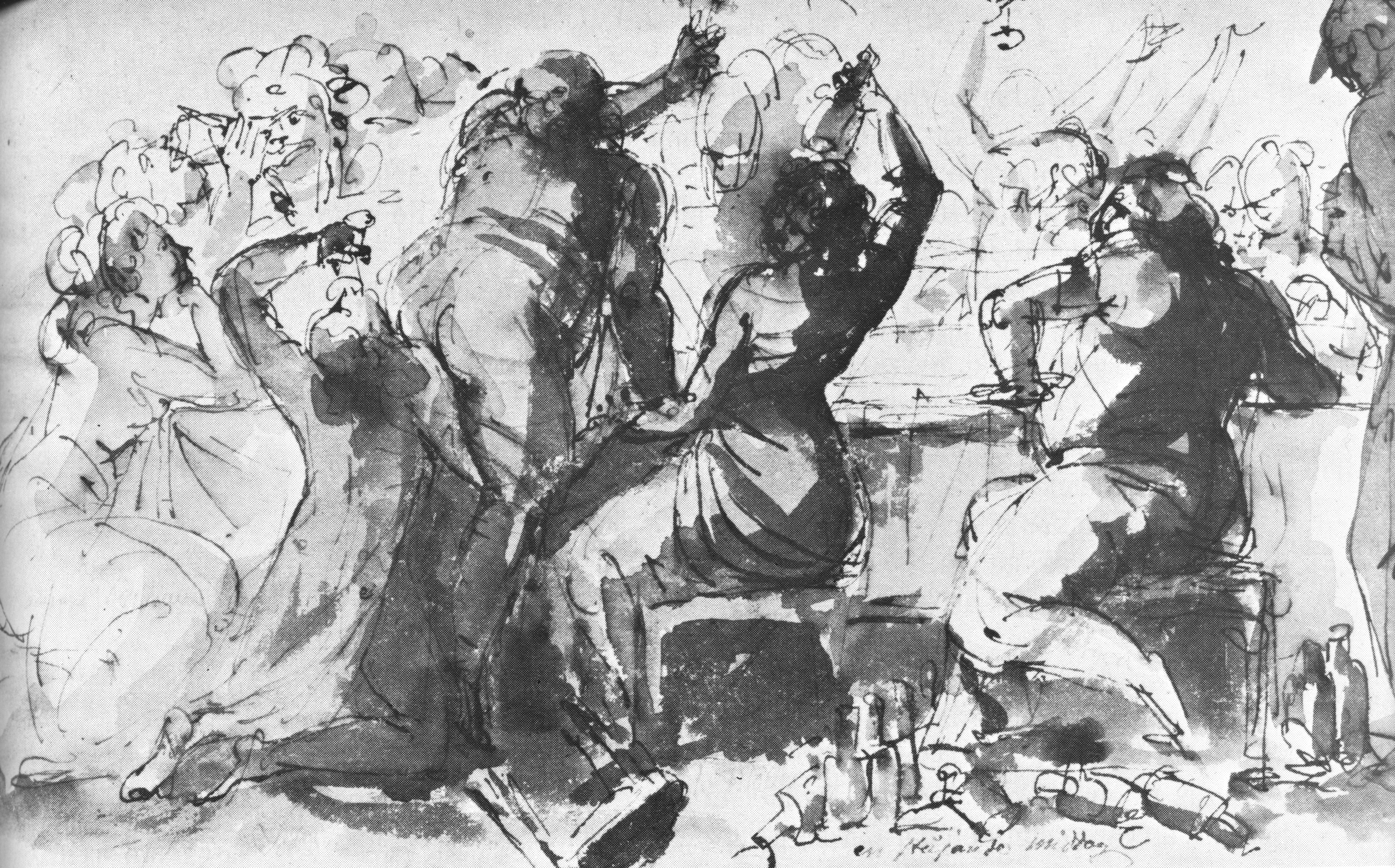
"A noisy company". Wash drawing by Johan Tobias Sergel (1740–1814)

Many of the Epistles have a Rococo theme, especially the pastorale pieces with a cast of gods and demigods from classical mythology. Thus, Epistle 25, "Blåsen nu alla (All blow now!)", a short crossing of the Stockholm waterway to Djurgården, is peopled with billowing waves, thunder, Venus, Neptune, tritons, postillions, angels, dolphins, zephyrs "and Paphos's whole might", as well as water-nymphs splashing about the "nymph" – in other words, Ulla Winblad.

The principal figures, given that the Epistles focus on drinking and its effects, along with "nymphs", are Bacchus and Venus / Fröja, but the cast is wider, including:

- Amaryllis – a nymph of the countryside (from Virgil's Eclogues)
- Bacchus – god of wine and drinking
- Charon – the ferryman of Hades, carrying souls to the place of the dead
- Chloris / Flora – the nymph or goddess of springtime, flowers and growth
- Clotho – one of the three fates, spinning the thread of human life (which is suddenly cut off)
- Cupid / Astrild – god of desire and erotic love, Astrild being a late Nordic invention
- Jupiter/Jofur – king of the gods on Mount Olympus, god of thunder
- Morpheus – god of sleep
- Neptune – god of the sea, accompanying the birth of Venus from the waves
- Nymph – a (beautiful) female nature deity
- Pan – god of wildness and rough countryside
- Themis – Titaness of divine law and justice
- Triton – messenger of the sea, accompanying Neptune
- Venus / Fröja / Aphrodite at Paphos – goddesses of love

== Realism ==
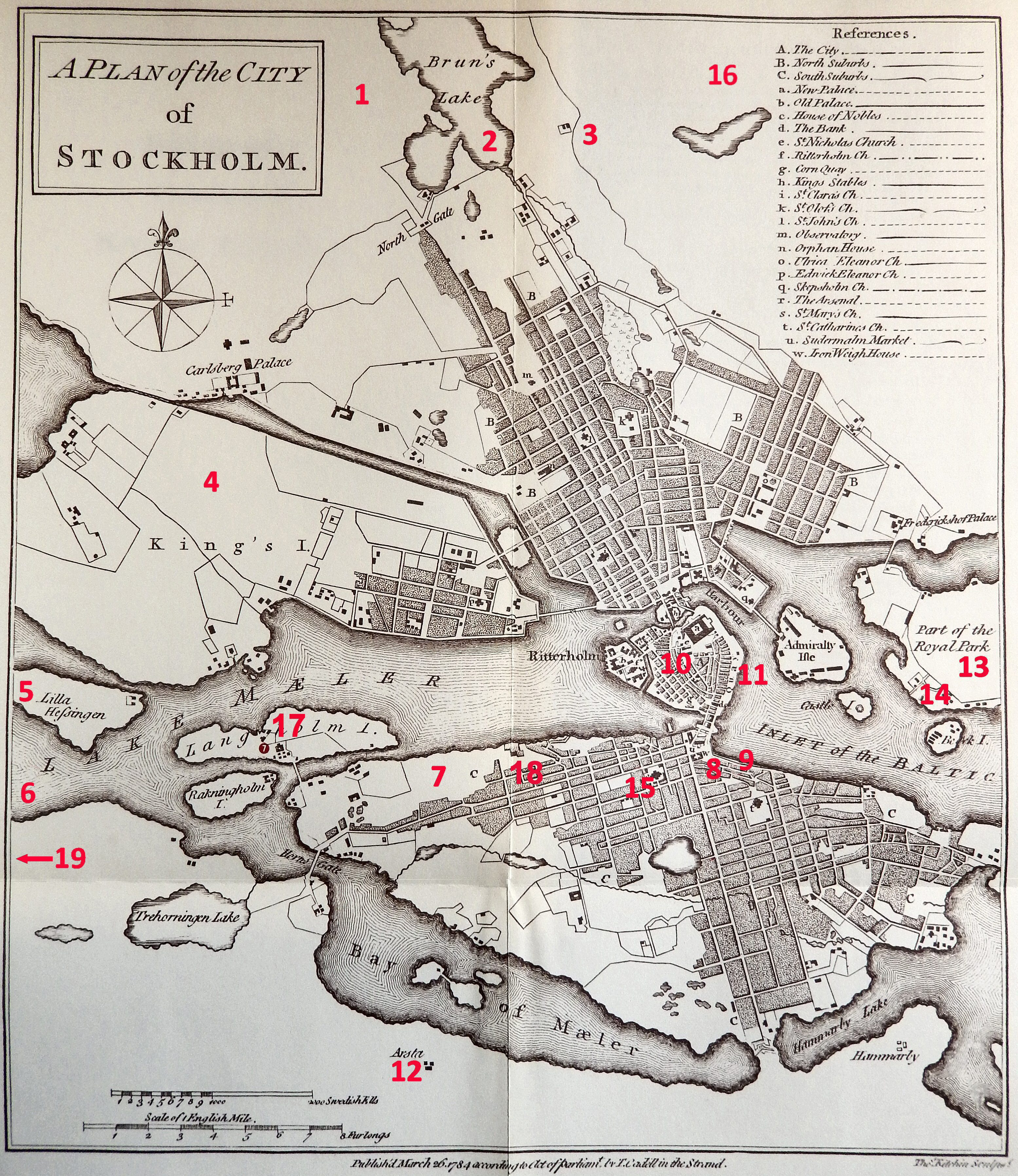
Map of Bellman's Stockholm, places of interest for his Fredman's Epistles and Songs on map from William Coxe's Travels into Poland, Russia, Sweden, and Denmark, 1784. 1 Haga park (S. 64) – 2 Brunnsviken – 3 Första Torpet (Ep. 80) – 4 Kungsholmen – 5 Hessingen (Ep. 48) – 6 Lake Mälaren (Ep. 48) – 7 Södermalm – 8 Urvädersgränd – 9 Lokatten tavern (Ep. 11, Ep. 59, Ep. 77), Bruna Dörren tavern (Ep. 24, Ep. 38) – 10 Gamla stan (Ep. 5, Ep. 9, Ep. 23, Ep. 28, Ep. 79) – 11 Skeppsbron Quay (Ep. 33) – 12 Årsta Castle – 13 Djurgården Park – (Ep. 25, Ep. 51, Ep. 82) – 14 Gröna Lund (Ep. 12, Ep. 62) – 15 Bellman's birthplace – 16 Fiskartorpet (Ep. 71) – 17 Lilla Sjötullen (Bellmanmuseet) (Ep. 48) – 18 Bensvarvars tavern (Ep. 40) 19 Rostock tavern (Ep. 45)

Alongside the frankly mythological, Fredman's Epistles have a convincing realism, painting pictures of moments of low life in Bellman's contemporary Stockholm. Bellman himself provided a list of descriptions of his characters, giving a brief pen-portrait of each one, like "Anders Wingmark, a former clothier in Urvädersgränd, very cheerful and full of commonsense". Different characters appear in different Epistles, making them realistically episodic. There is a fire in Epistle 34; a funeral is busily prepared in Epistles 46 and 47; and a fight breaks out in Epistle 53. Many of the songs are about the effects of strong drink, from the damage to the Gröna Lund Tavern in Epistle 12 to the masterly portrait of a drunkard lying in the gutter of Epistle 23, described by Oscar Levertin as "the to-be-or-not-to-be of Swedish literature".

The pastoral Epistles, too, give the impression of being in real places, with flesh-and-blood people, at specific times of day. Epistle 48 tells how the friends return to Stockholm by boat after a night out on Lake Mälaren, one summer morning in 1769. Each of its twenty-one verses paints a picture of a moment in the peaceful journey, from the wind stirring the fallen sails, the skipper's daughter coming out of her cabin, the cockerel crowing, the church clock striking four in the morning, the sun glimmering on the calm water. The effects may seem to be haphazard, but "each stanza is a little picture, framed by its melody. We remember it all, seem to have lived through it, like a morning in our own lives." Britten Austin calls it "a new vision of the natural and urban scene. Fresh as Martin's. Detailed as Hogarth's. Frail and ethereal as Watteau's."

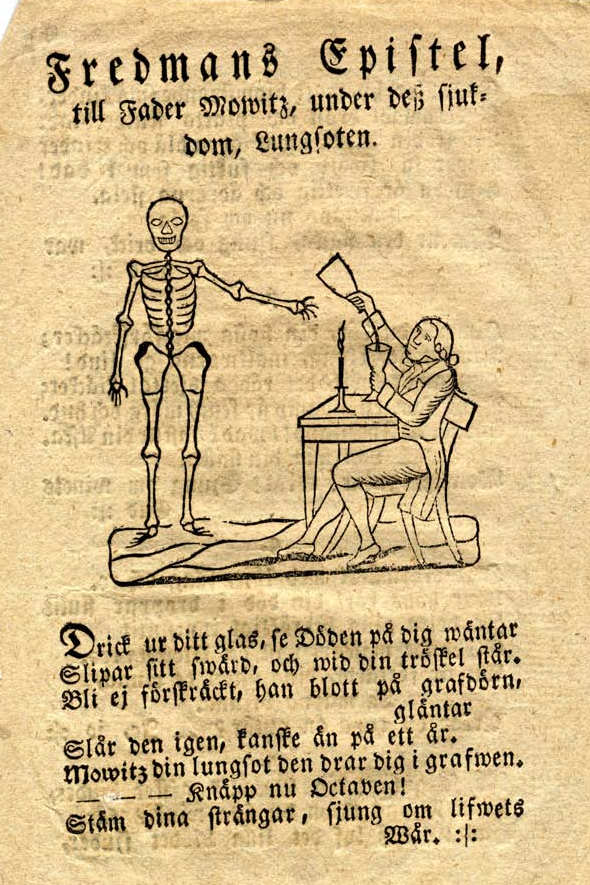
An 1825 broadside with Fredman's Epistle No. 30: Drick ur ditt glas, se Döden på dig väntar (In Paul Britten Austin's translation "Drain off thy glass, see death upon thee waiting")

Britten Austin tempers his praise for Bellman's realism with the observation that the effects are chosen to work in song, rather than to be strictly correct or even possible. Thus in Epistle 72, "Glimmande Nymf", the memorable rainbow with its glowing colours "of purple, gold and green" is seen after nightfall. He comments "Never mind. It is a beautiful scene, even if its chronology calls for much poetic license." Or in Epistle 80, "Liksom en herdinna", the farmer is for some reason going to or coming from market on a Sunday, when the market would be closed; and his cart "heavy on staggering wheel" must have been absurdly full if it contained chickens, lambs, and calves all at once. But it had to be a Sunday to allow Ulla Winblad to step out of her swaying chaise, on an outing from the city. Britten Austin remarks that "until such solecisms are actually pointed out, one does not even notice them." It is the same with the meals, which would cause "terrible indigestion" if the listener actually had to eat them, (Note: For example, in Epistle 71, "Ulla min Ulla", the breakfast consists of a freshly caught Crucian carp, and strawberries in a bowl of milk and wine; while in Epistle 43, "Värm mer öl och bröd", Ulla is to be provided with hot beer and bread, flavoured with cumin, as well as Rhenish wine, milk, mead, sugar, and ginger. In Epistle 82, the "little breakfast" consists of "red wine with burnet, and a newly-shot snipe", along with "dinner wine" and hot coffee.) but "as a feast for mind, eye and ear they are highly satisfactory", the imagination filled with "all the poetic wealth" that Bellman provides.

The literary historian Lars Warme observes that Bellman's sharp eye for detail has brought him praise for being the first Swedish realist, but at once balances this by saying that

his particular brand of 'realism' carries with it a heaping measure of pure fantasy, grotesque humor, and—not least—an elegant veneer of classical mythology.

Warme credits Bellman with a good knowledge of a literary craftsman's tools, using rhetoric and classical knowledge "to provide a theatrical backdrop for his tavern folk." The result is an "astonishing mixture of realism and wild mythological fantasy", set to complicated musical structures:

marches and contradances, operatic ariettes, and graceful minuets. The result is related to a drinking song only by derivation. As an artistic achievement it stands alone in the history of Swedish poetry.

== Fitted to music ==
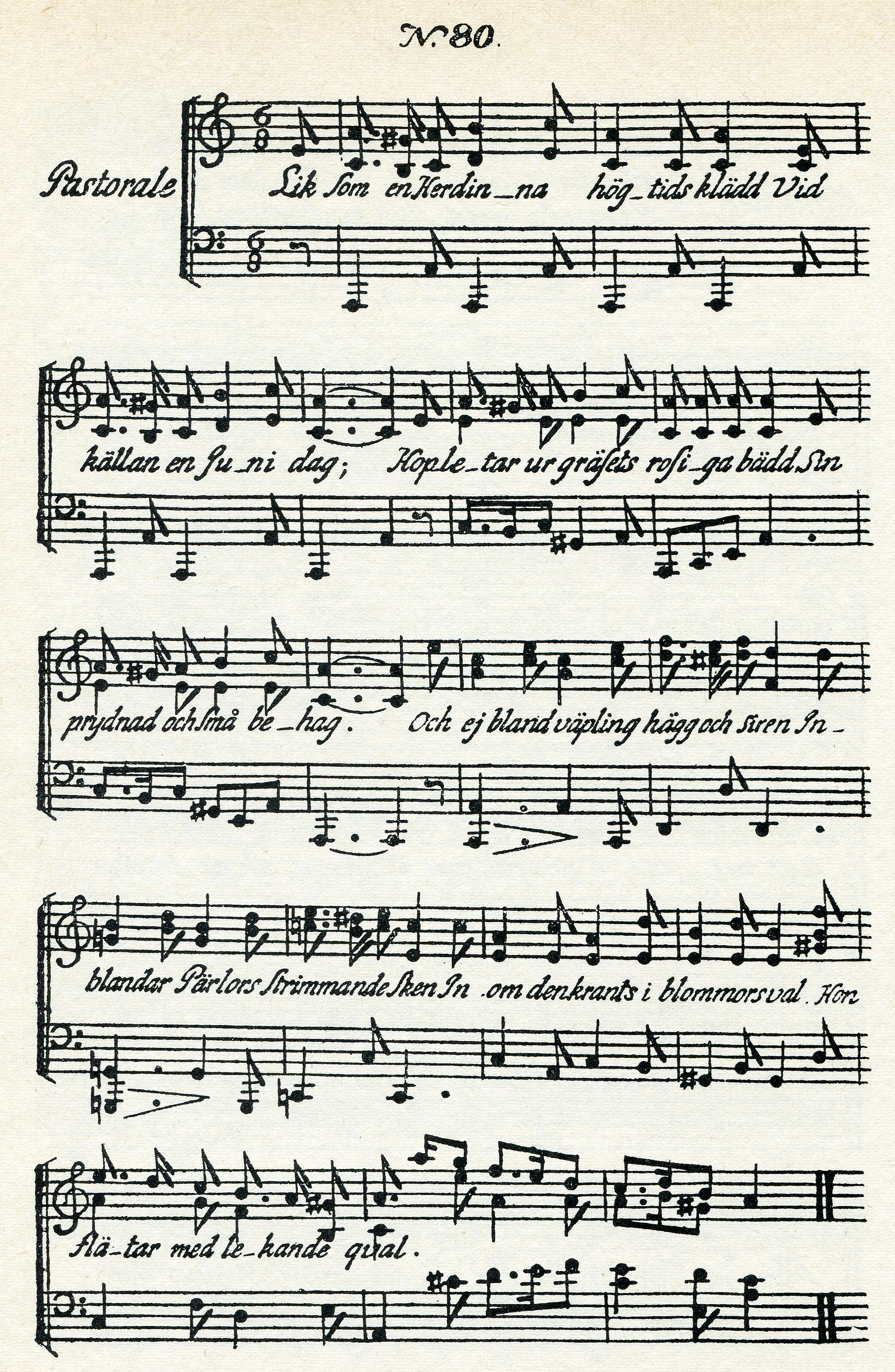
Sheet music for Fredman's Epistle 80, "Liksom en herdinna" (As a shepherdess), a pastorale

The critic Johan Henric Kellgren, in his introduction to the first edition, found that the songs could not be known fully only as poems. Never before, he stated, had the art of poetry and the art of music been more fraternally united. They were not, Kellgren argued, verse that had been set to music; not music, set to verse; but the two were so thoroughly melted together into One beauty that it was impossible to see which would most miss the other for its fulfilment. (Note: Kellgren wrote: Säkert känner man ännu ej mer än til hälften dessa Poemers värde, om man blott känner dem som Poemer. Aldrig ännu voro Skaldekonst och Tonkonst mera systerligt förente. Det är icke Vers, som äro gjorde til denna Musik; icke Musik, som är satt til dessa Vers: de hafva så iklädt sig hvarandras behag, så sammansmält til En Skönhet, at man föga kan se hvilken mäst skulle sakna den andra för sin fullkomlighet: Verserne, at rätt fattas; eller Musiken, at rätt höras.) Quoting this in the final paragraph of his thesis, Massengale commented "That is how it ought to be said!"

Massengale argues that, given that music is so important in the Epistles, and that Bellman had more than enough musical skill to write a tune, it is remarkable that all or almost all the tunes are borrowed. He suggests that this "seems to indicate that Bellman wanted to preserve some vestige of the borrowing." That the borrowing was not just about saving effort or making up for absent skill, Massengale argues, is demonstrated by the fact that the amount of work Bellman had to put into the melodies for Epistles 12 ("Gråt Fader Berg och spela") and 24 ("Kära syster") was "surely tantamount to the production of new melodies." Borrowing was accepted, even encouraged at the time, but that does not explain why Bellman would have done it so consistently. The "poetic possibility", Massengale suggests, is that Bellman wished to exploit the humorous contrast between a melody of one type and a story of another, or between an existing image associated with the melody, and a fresh one presented in an Epistle. In addition, Bellman was able to use what his audience knew to be borrowed music to reinforce the historical flavour of the Epistles, introducing exactly the kind of ambiguity that he was seeking.

Massengale points out that in the Epistles, Bellman employs a variety of methods to make the poetry work. For example, in Epistle 35, Bröderna fara väl vilse ibland, Bellman uses a panoply of metrical devices to counteract the "metrically plodding melody". He uses the rhetorical figure anadiplosis (repeating the last word of a clause at the start of the next) in verse 3 with "...skaffa jag barnet; barnet det dog,..." (...got I the child; the child died...) and again in verse 4. He uses epanalepsis (repeating the first word of a clause at its end) in verse 3, with "Men, min Anna Greta, men!" (But, my Anna Greta, but!), and again in verse 5. And he uses anaphora (repeating a word at the starts of neighbouring clauses) in verse 4, "häll den på hjärtat, häll man fyra!" (pour ... pour out four!), and again in verse 5. Massengale observes that good musical poetry, like this Epistle, is always a compromise, as it has both to fit its music or be no good as a musical setting, and to contrast with its music, or be no good as poetry. The final verse, containing all three metrical devices, is not, argues Massengale, an example of "decay", but shows Bellman's freedom, change of focus (from lament to acceptance), and the closure of the Epistle.

== Improvisation ==
King Gustav III called Bellman "Il signor improvisatore" (The master improviser). Scholars have debated the question of how far the Epistles are in fact improvisations. Carol J. Clover writes that while many of the Epistles give the impression of having been improvised during performance, there is plentiful evidence to the contrary. She notes Milman Parry's identification of the poetic formula, a metrical phrase for a particular idea, as the hallmark of improvised, orally composed, poetry; and that Bellman certainly had "regular usages" in the Epistles. These include hundreds of repetitions of phrases like "Kära syster" (among other occurrences, the title of Epistle 24), "Kära bror", "Kära vänner" and so forth for various persons. She notes, too, that while vin (wine) often appears without kärlek (love), "kärlek, in keeping with Fredman's program, is rarely mentioned apart from vin", giving instances like Epistle 24's Sjung om kärlek, vin och lycka alongside Epistle 11's Sjungom om kärlek, ropa på vin and phrases from Epistles 4, 13, 17, 21, and 64. She writes that the early Epistles have the rough-and-ready, but also quick and verbally clever, quality of krogspoesi (tavern verse). In contrast, a late one like Liksom en Herdinna, högtids klädd (Epistle 80) is evidently a "highly conscious literary composition" with "longer lines and a more relaxed rhyme pattern" which permits more complex content, in that case a rococo pastorale. She notes Anton Blanck's identification of 1772 as the turning point, from Bellman's early years in the relaxed 18th century frihetstiden to the Gustavian era's "poised rococo consciousness". In her view, the early Epistles are close to the improvisatory tradition, while the later ones are undoubtedly more literary.

== Impact ==
=== In Bellman's lifetime ===
Bellman is said to have had an "enormous reputation" in his lifetime. The critic Kellgren had earlier objected both to Bellman's fame and to his flouting of the rules of good literary taste. Kellgren put his objections into verse:

Anacreon! Where is thy fame?
Thy lyre another's hand has seized
Whose wit, with drunken sallies pleas'd,
Priapus' court delights; the same
Grows wild apace as e'er Chrysippos,
And full as rich his learnéd vein.

In other words, Bellman was a "tavern rhymester", admittedly with a wonderful gift of improvisation, who wildly ignored the rules of literary genres. For example, within the classical tradition odes and satires were supposed to have different metres and different use of language. Kellgren did not mind the amoral attitude: "indeed he shared it". But an Epistle like No. 28 traversed all moods, "from lyrical to humorous, tragic, descriptive and dramatic." It was too much for critics such as Kellgren. By the time of publication however, Kellgren had changed his mind, and helped in the publication of the epistles and wrote a foreword praising Bellman's verse.

=== In later times ===
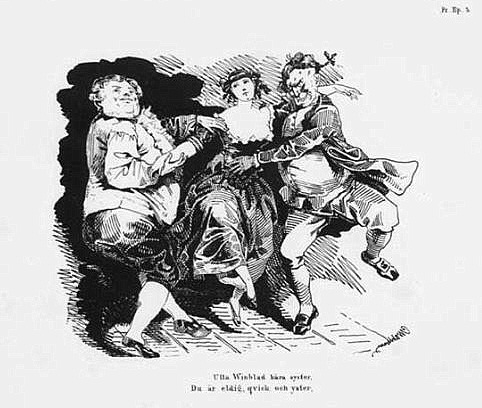
19th century illustration for "Ulla Winblad kära syster. Du är eldig, qvick och yster...". Fredman's Epistle No. 3, by Carl Wahlbom (1810–1858)

Bellman was sung "with delight" by students and schoolchildren from the start of the 19th century. The Romantic movement treated Bellman as an inspired genius, whereas later he was admired more for his artistic skill and literary innovation. Research into Bellman's work began in the 19th century; the Bellman Society formalised Bellman studies with their standard edition and their Bellmansstudier publications in the 20th century. Towards the end of the 20th century, an increasing number of doctoral theses have been written on Bellman's life and work.

Many of the songs have remained culturally significant in Scandinavia, especially in Sweden, where Bellman remains "widely popular to this day". In 1989, the Swedish government subsided an edition of Bellman's Epistles and Songs, with illustrations by Peter Dahl, to bring the texts to a wide audience.

Bellman has been compared with poets and musicians as diverse as Shakespeare and Beethoven. Åse Kleveland notes that he has been called "Swedish poetry's Mozart, and Hogarth", observing that

The comparison with Hogarth was no accident. Like the English portrait painter, Bellman drew detailed pictures of his time in his songs, not so much of life at court as of ordinary people's everyday.

Britten Austin says instead simply that:

Bellman is unique among great poets, I think, in that virtually his entire opus is conceived to music. Other poets, of course, notably our Elizabethans, have written songs. But song was only one branch of their art. They did not leave behind, as Bellman did, a great musical-literary work nor paint in words and music a canvas of their age. Nor are their songs dramatic.

Charles Wharton Stork commented in his 1917 anthology of Swedish verse that "The anthologist finds little to pause over until he comes to the poetry of Karl Mikael Bellman (1740–1795), but here he must linger long." Describing him as a "master of improvisation", he wrote:

Like all great masters, Bellman reconciles the opposing elements of style and substance, of form and fire. His content reminds one somewhat of the pictures of Rome in Horace's Epistles. Fredman, who is the poet himself, introduces his readers to an intimate circle of friends: to Movitz, to Mollberg, to Amaryllis, to Ulla Vinblad, and the rest. With them we witness the life of Stockholm : the world awakening at daybreak after rain, a funeral, a concert, a visit to a sick friend, and various idyllic excursions into the neighboring parks and villages. The little world lives and we live in it. Considering this phase of Bellman's genius, the critic will pronounce him a realist of the first order. But when one notes his dazzling mastery of form, his prodigal variety of meter and stanza, his ease and spontaneity, one is equally tempted to call him a virtuoso of lyric style."

=== Performance and recordings ===
The Epistles are widely sung and recorded by amateur choirs and professional singers alike. The Orphei Drängar (Orpheus's farmhands) are a choir named for a phrase in Epistle 14, and set up to perform Bellman's works; they give concerts (of music by many composers) around the world.

Several professional solo singers in the Swedish ballad tradition largely made their name in the 1960s singing Bellman, while accompanying themselves in Bellmanesque style with a guitar. They were the members of the "Storks" artistic community ("Vispråmen Storken") in Stockholm, and they include Fred Åkerström (1937–1985) with his albums Fred sjunger Bellman, Glimmande nymf and Vila vid denna källa, and Cornelis Vreeswijk with his albums Spring mot Ulla, spring! and Movitz! Movitz! Other singers, such as Sven-Bertil Taube and William Clauson, used the less authentic accompaniment of an ensemble; Clauson was also the first to release a recording of Bellman in English, alongside his Swedish recordings.

Singers from other traditions sometimes sing Bellman; for example, the folk singer Sofia Karlsson and the rock musician Kajsa Grytt.

== Editions ==
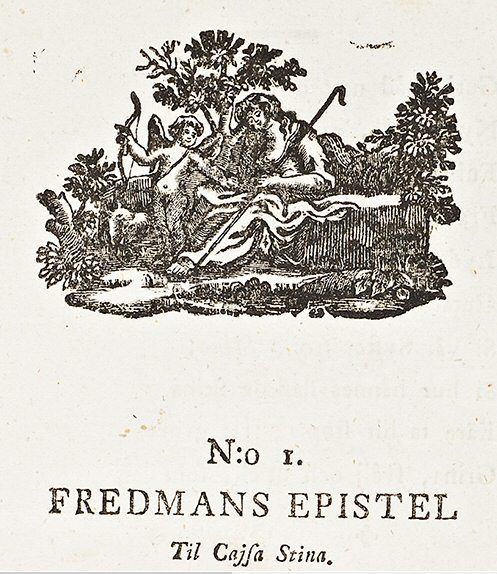
Pastoral head-piece engraving in the first edition

The 1790 edition was the only one to appear in Bellman's lifetime. It was published by Olof Åhlström, by royal privilege; he held a monopoly on the printing of sheet music in Sweden. Åhlström arranged the songs for piano, and Kellgren edited the song texts and wrote an introduction, but the extent of their influence on the shape of Fredman's Epistles cannot be fully determined. (Note: For a recent treatment and a summary of earlier research, see the 1990 critical edition of the Epistles by Gunnar Hillbom (text) & James Massengale (music), in particular Hillbom's introduction, "Fredmans epistlar 1790 och 1990", in vol. 2, pages 111–152 (which covers Åhlström's and Kellgren's collaboration with Bellman on the first edition and its prehistory). The background of the collection is covered by Hillbom in "Sångerna som blev Fredmans", vol. 2, pages 95–134. Original editions: Bellman 1790, Fredmans epistlar; Bellman 1791, Fredmans sånger) The edition was illustrated with a frontispiece by the leading Swedish artist Johan Tobias Sergel, engraved by Johan Fredrik Martin.

The corpus of published Epistles did not change after Bellman's death. Many minor selections from the Epistles have been published, sometimes with illustrations and introductions. The Epistles have been translated, at least partially, into Danish, German, French, English, Russian, Polish, Finnish, Norwegian, Italian, Spanish, and Dutch, as shown below.

The English edition by Britten Austin is a selection of the Epistles, and is in rhyming verse in the original metre. Britten Austin describes the challenge of translation as difficult or impossible, and admits that in one way his translations are inevitably "a little faint." He explains this is because "Bellman's colloquialisms which offended his contemporaries still strike Swedish ears as the language of everyday speech. My renderings, therefore, may seem a trifle too antique in flavour; but to have jumbled up, as Bellman brilliantly does, modern-sounding slang with the graces of Rococo diction, would have produced a horrid effect.

Editions and selections of the Epistles, some with illustrations, some with music, some printed together with Fredman's Songs, include:

- 1790: Fredmans epistlar, Stockholm: Olof Åhlström, by Royal Privilege.

--- facsimile reprint, 1976: Uddevalla.

- 1816: Fredmans epistlar, Stockholm: Rumstedt.
- 1844: Fredmans epistlar, Copenhagen: Jaeger. With 24 coloured lithographs.
- 1869: Fredmans epistlar och sånger, Stockholm: Elkan and Schildknecht.
- 1889: Fredmans epistlar, Stockholm: Bonniers. Arranged for piano solo.
- 1899: Fredmans epistlar af Carl Michael Bellman, Stockholm: Ljus. Intro. by Oscar Levertin. Illus. by Alf Wallander.
- 1909: Fredmans Episteln, Jena: E. Diederichs. (In German)
- 1920: Fredmans epistlar, Ord och musik, Stockholm: Bonniers.
- 1927: Carl Michael Bellmans skrifter. 1. Fredmans Epistlar, Stockholm: Bellmanssällskapet. ("Standard Edition")
- 1994: Fredmans epistlar, Stockholm: Proprius.

Translations of the Epistles similarly include:

- 1858: Fredmans epistlar, Text och musik, Copenhagen: J. Erslev. (In Danish)
- 1953: Les Épîtres de Fredman, Stockholm: Norstedt. (In French) 28 Epistles trans. Nils Afzelius and Pierre Volboudt. Illus. by Elias Martin.

--- reprinted, 1984: La Ferté-Milon.

- 1958: Das trunkene Lied, Munich: Desch. (In German). trans. Hanns von Gumppenberg, Felix Niedner, Georg Schwarz.
- 1977: Fredman's Epistles and Songs, Stockholm: Reuter and Reuter. (In English) trans. Paul Britten Austin.
- 1982: Pesni Fredmana; Poslaniia Fredmana, Leningrad: Khudozh. (In Russian)
- 1991: Fredmanowe posłania i pieśni, Kraków: Polskie Wydawnictwo Muzyczne. (In Polish)
- 1991: Lauluja ja epistoloita, Helsinki: Yliopistopaino. (In Finnish)
- 2002: Ulla, mia Ulla: antologia poetica in italiano cantabile, Rome: Istituti editoriali e poligrafici internazionali. (In Italian). A selection.
- 2003: Sterven van liefde en leven van wijn : een bloemlezing uit de Epistels & Zangen van Fredman, 's-Hertogenbosch : Voltaire. (In Dutch). A selection.

== Sources ==
- Bellman, Carl Michael (1790). Fredmans epistlar. Stockholm: By Royal Privilege.
- Bellman, Carl Michael (1791). Fredmans sånger. Stockholm: By Royal Privilege.
- Blanck, Anton (1941). Bellman vid skiljovägen: och andra studier [Bellman at the crossroads: and other studies] (in Swedish). Geber.
- Britten Austin, Paul (1967). The Life and Songs of Carl Michael Bellman: Genius of the Swedish Rococo. New York: Allhem, Malmö American-Scandinavian Foundation. ISBN 978-3-932759-00-0.
- Britten Austin, Paul (1999) [1990]. Fredman's Epistles and Songs: A Selection in English. Stockholm: Proprius. ISBN 978-9-231-03608-8.
- Burman, Carina (2019). Bellman. Biografin [Bellman. The Biography] (in Swedish). Stockholm: Albert Bonniers Förlag. ISBN 978-9100141790.
- Clover, Carol J. (1972). "Improvisation in Fredmans Epistlar". Scandinavian Studies. 44 (3): 310–335. JSTOR 40917408.
- Hägg, Göran (1996). Den svenska litteraturhistorien [The Swedish literature history]. Stockholm: Wahlström & Widstrand. ISBN 91-46-17629-2.
- Hassler, Göran; Dahl, Peter (illus.) (1989). Bellman – en antologi [Bellman – an anthology]. Stockholm: En bok för alla. ISBN 978-91-7448-512-7. (contains the most popular Epistles and Songs, in Swedish, with sheet music)
- Hassler, Göran; Dahl, Peter (illus.) (1989b). Bellman II – en antologi [Bellman – an anthology]. Stockholm: En bok för alla. ISBN 978-91-7448-742-8. (contains the remaining Epistles and Songs, in Swedish, with sheet music)
- Kleveland, Åse; Ehrén, Svenolov (illus.) (1984). Fredmans epistlar & sånger [The songs and Epistles of Fredman]. Stockholm: Informationsförlaget. ISBN 978-91-7736-059-9. (with facsimiles of sheet music from first editions in 1790, 1791)
- Lönnroth, Lars (2005). Ljuva karneval!: om Carl Michael Bellmans diktning [Lovely Carnival!: about Carl Michael Bellman's Verse] (in Swedish). Stockholm: Albert Bonniers Förlag. ISBN 978-91-0-057245-7. OCLC 61881374.
- Massengale, James Rhea (1979). The Musical-Poetic Method of Carl Michael Bellman. Stockholm: Almqvist & Wiksell International. ISBN 978-91-554-0849-7.
- Stork, Charles Wharton (1917). Anthology of Swedish lyrics from 1750 to 1915. New York: The American-Scandinavian Foundation.
- Van Loon, Hendrik Willem; Castagnetta, Grace (1939). The Last of the Troubadours. New York: Simon & Schuster.
- Warme, Lars G. (1996). A History of Swedish Literature. Lincoln, Nebraska: University of Nebraska Press. ISBN 0-8032-4750-8.
