= Lennart Rodhe =

- Born: Lennart Olof Rodhe; November 15, 1916; Stockholm, Sweden
- Died: January 17, 2005 (aged 88); Stockholm, Sweden
- Education: The Royal University College of Fine Arts (KKH), Stockholm, Sweden, 1938-1944
- Known for: Painting, Printmaking
- Notable work: Spiraltrappan (1946), Sågverket (1947), Snurran (1948), Drakar (1948), Rotor (1954), Årstiderna (1959), Familjen (1966), Skogen (1977-79)
- Movement: art

Lennart Rodhe (November 15, 1916 – January 17, 2005) was a Swedish artist, painter and printmaker.

Lennart Rodhe enrolled as a student in 1934 at Edward Berggrens studio at Tekniska skolan in Stockholm, and studied under Peter Rostrup-Boyesen i Copenhagen and at the Royal University College of Fine Arts in Stockholm 1938–44 with Sven X:et Erixon as teacher. He also studied anatomy at Kunstakademiet i Köpenhamn. Lennart Rodhe is considered one of the most prominent of the Swedish modernists, notable as a professor at Royal University College of Fine Arts in Stockholm, as someone who strongly influenced his students, such as Peter Dahl and Olle Bauman, although his strict methods of education based on the study of model drawing scared off some students.

He was also a member of 1947 års män (the men of the year 1947), who in 1947 exhibited at the exhibition Ung konst at Gallery Färg och Form at Brunkebergstorg in Stockholm. He was awarded the Prince Eugen Medal for painting in 1967.

== Books ==
- Lennart Rodhe, by Ulf Linde, Bonniers små konstböcker 2, Stockholm, Sweden 1962
- Lennart Rodhe, by Thomas Millroth, Sveriges Allmänna Konstförenings publikation 98, Stockholm, Sweden 1989, ISSN 0284-2033
- Lennart Rodhe, Atlantis, Stockholm, Sweden 1990, ISBN 91-7486-925-6
- Rumsbildning, by Lars-Göran Oredsson, Kalejdoskop, Åhus, Sweden 1991, ISBN 91-7936-048-3
- Rodhe som Grafiker, by Börje Magnusson och Thomas Millroth, Stockholm, Sweden 1993, ISBN 91-972056-0-5
- Bagateller, by Per Bjurström, Carlsson Bokförlag, Stockholm, Sweden 1995, ISBN 91-7798-962-7
- Blockteckningar och reseskisser, by Per Bjurström, Carlsson Bokförlag, Stockholm, Sweden 1995, ISBN 91-7798-963-5
- Kyrkogården - Växthuset, by Per Bjurström, Carlsson Bokförlag, Stockholm, Sweden 1997, ISBN 91-7203-228-6
