= Peter Dahl (artist) =

Swedish painter, sculptor, and printmaker (1934–2019)

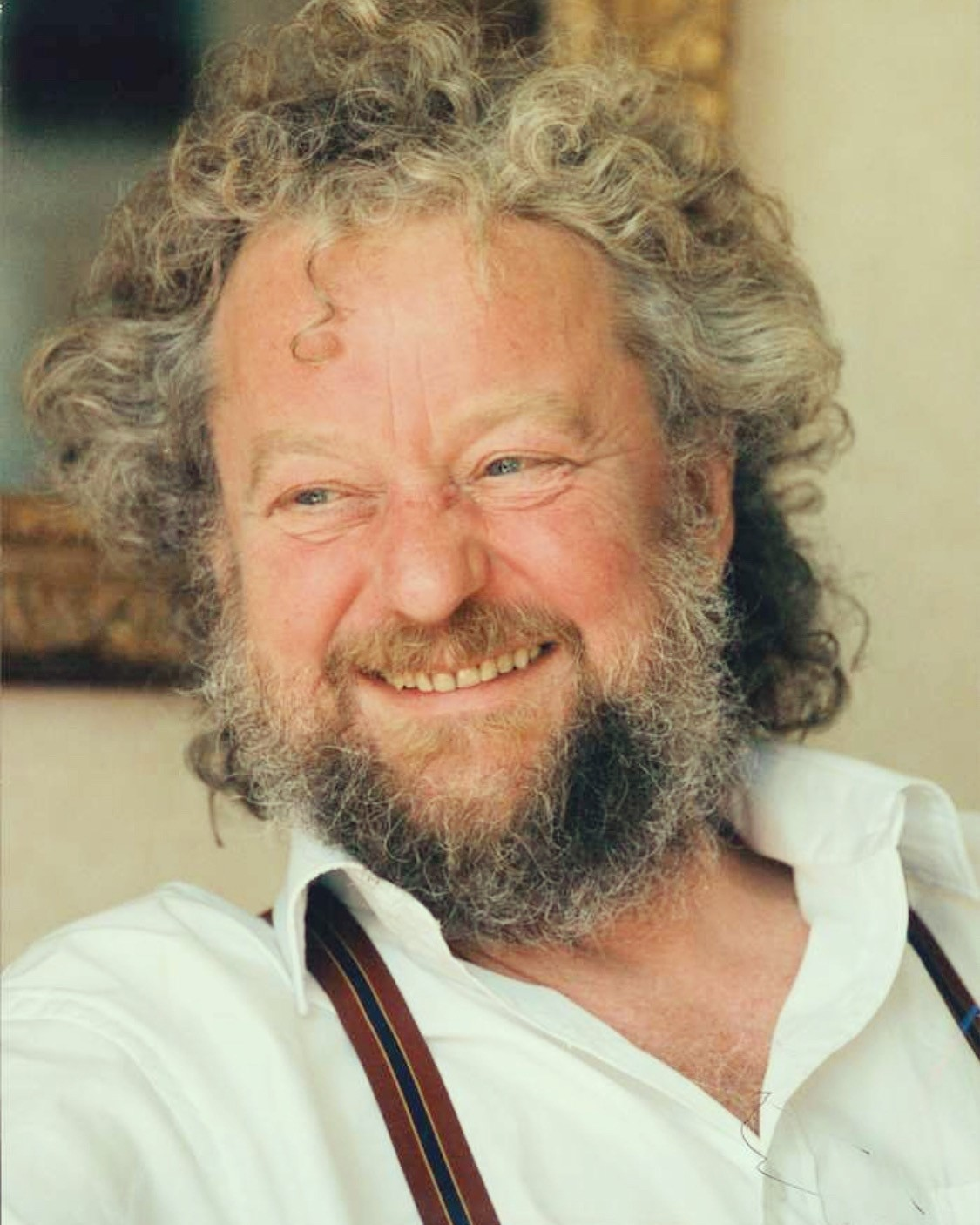
- Born: 16 February 1934; Oslo, Norway
- Died: 17 May 2019 (aged 85); Stockholm, Sweden
- Education: Royal Swedish Academy of Fine Arts, Stockholm
- Known for: Painting, sculpture
- Notable work: Liberalismens genombrott i societeten
- Style: Expressive realism
- Awards: Illis quorum 2006

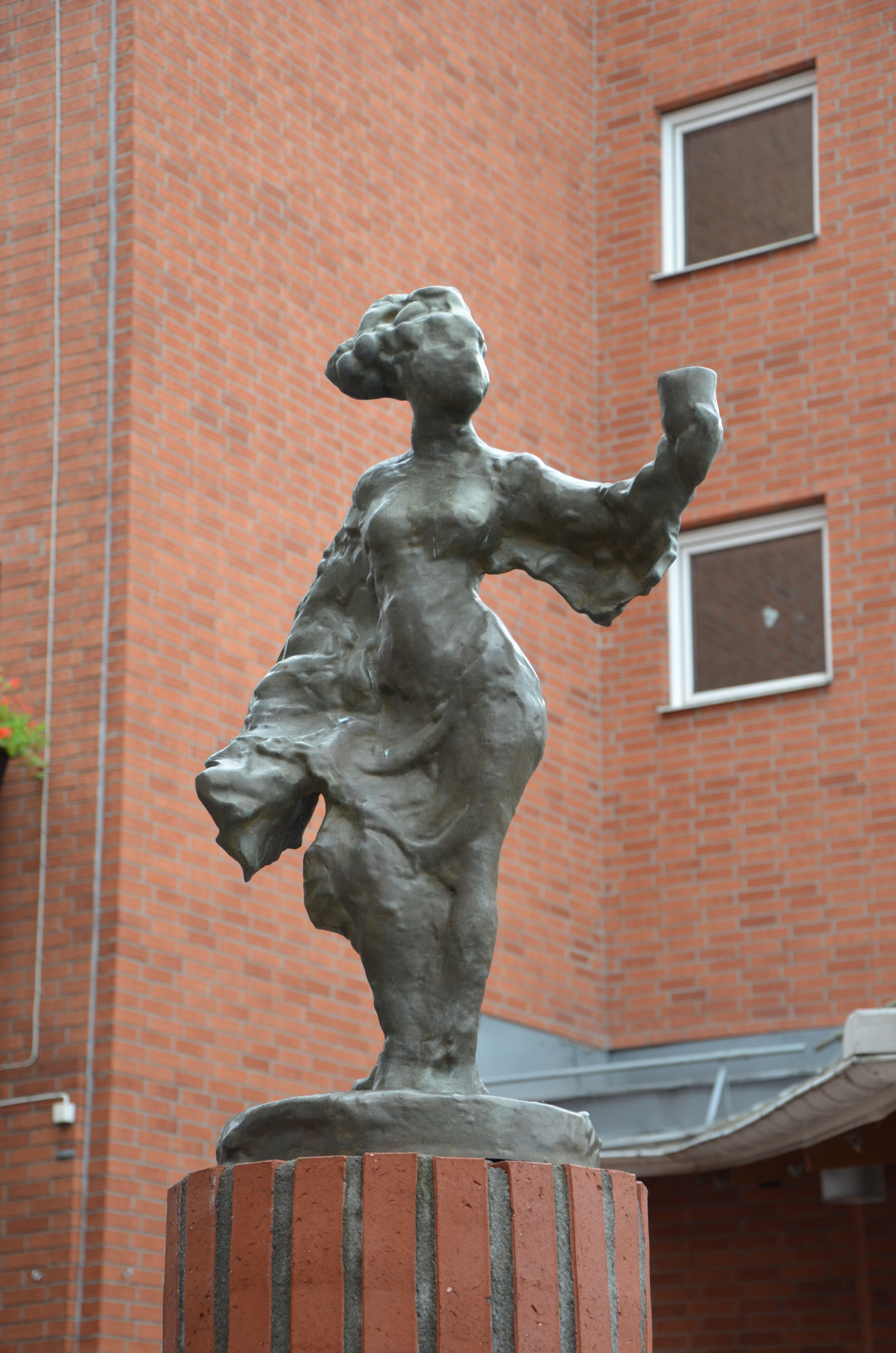
Freja on Sjödalstorget in Huddinge

Peter Dahl (16 February 1934 – 17 May 2019) was a Swedish painter, sculptor, and printmaker.

== Biography ==
Peter Dahl was the son of Hans Peter Dahl and Ragna née Askvik. The family moved in February 1939 from Norway to the borough of Bromma in Stockholm. His paternal grandmother and paternal uncles, including graphic artist Chrix Dahl, stayed in Norway; he spent summers as a child with the family in Vestre Aker. He became a Swedish citizen in 1954. From 1999 until his death, he was married to Tina Hamrin Dahl, PhD in History of Religion and MA in Political Science. They lived on Kungsholmen in Stockholm.

Dahl was educated at the Royal Swedish Academy of Fine Arts from 1958 to 1963 under Lennart Rodhe, and studied at the Gerlesborg School of Fine Art from 1959 to 1969 and at a number of other private and state art schools. He was himself a teacher at the Gerlesborg School from 1960 to 1970, head instructor at Valand Academy in Gothenburg from 1971 to 1973 and professor of painting at the Royal Swedish Academy of Fine Arts in Stockholm from 1975 to 1979.

In 1970, Dahl gained notoriety with the painting Liberalismens genombrott i societeten ('Liberalism's Breakthrough in Society'), also known as Sibyllatavlan ('The Sibyl Painting') from the series Drömmar i soffhörnet ('Dreams in the Corner of the Sofa'). The painting, which was exhibited at Göteborgs Konsthall, was seized by the police on 11 December on charges of indecency. After six months, however, the painting was returned to Dahl; it now hangs in the Gothenburg Museum of Art.

Dahl had his major public breakthrough in 1982 at the Konstnärshuset in Stockholm with the painting Parken ('The Park') and others. He became even more popular with his interpretations of all the Fredmans epistler, 87 lithographs that were shown around the country from 1984. Paintings in the spirit of Carl Michael Bellman were also presented. Dahl is also known for his great passion for the fantasy world of Caribanien. Dahl had his studio on the fourth floor of Sigurd Rings gata 12 in Aspudden, overlooking Vinterviken; the studio is now a condominium. The studio was later located at the top of the building at Norr Mälarstrand 26 on Kungsholmen in Stockholm, overlooking the Riddarfjärden. Dahl is represented at the Kalmar konstmuseum, Norrköpings Konstmuseum and Moderna Museet, among others. He is also represented in the Bonnier portrait collection.

He illustrated En bok för alla's 1989 edition of Carl Michael Bellman's songs.

In 2006, Dahl was awarded the Illis quorum medal of the twelfth magnitude.

On 18 May 2019, it was announced that Dahl had died in Stockholm, aged 85.
