= William Clauson =

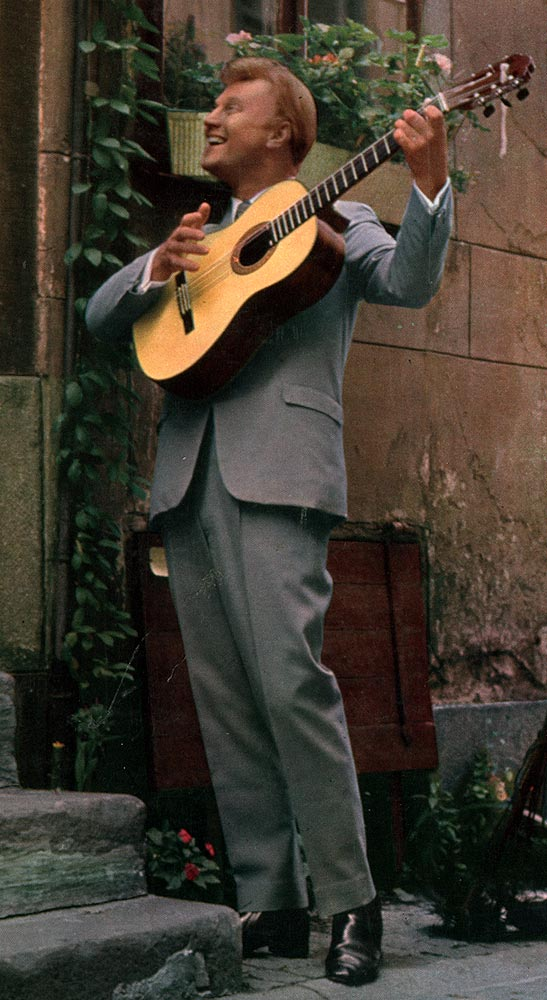
- Clauson in 1966

Background information
- Born: May 2, 1930; Ashtabula, Ohio, United States
- Died: September 3, 2017 (aged 87) Tijuana, Mexico
- Genres: Traditional folk music, world music, children's songs
- Occupations: Singer, song collector, actor
- Instrument: Guitar
- Years active: c.1950-c.1980
- Website: http://www.williamclauson.com/

William Clauson (May 2, 1930 – September 3, 2017) was a Swedish-American singer of folk songs from various nations, including some of the songs of Carl Michael Bellman in both English and Swedish.

== Biography ==
Clauson was born in Ashtabula, Ohio, to parents who were immigrants from Sweden. When he was two, the family returned to live in Viskafors, Sweden, and William began studying violin and singing at a music conservatory in Borås. At the age of six, he returned to the US to live with an uncle in Covina, California, and began playing the guitar. Four years later, he won the title of "All American Boy" at the Hollywood Bowl, and began taking occasional small uncredited acting roles in movies including Abbott and Costello's The Wistful Widow of Wagon Gap (1947).

According to Clauson, his big break as a performer came when he attended a lecture and concert by Carl Sandburg, at which Sandburg asked to borrow his guitar and later asked to hear some of Clauson's own songs. Sandburg became his mentor and helped launch his performing career. Inspired by Burl Ives, Clauson began performing folk songs from different countries. He moved to Sweden in 1954, married, and made his first recordings in Stockholm with the orchestra of Lille Bror Söderlundh. He became a popular singer in Sweden, appearing regularly on Swedish television and radio. He also toured around Europe, India, Australia, and the Americas, including appearances at Carnegie Hall in New York City, and the Royal Festival Hall in London.

His repertoire included children's songs, and Swedish, British and American folk songs. Among the songs which he recorded in the 1950s were "La Bamba" – which he claimed to have first heard when visiting Veracruz, Mexico, and to have helped popularise – and "He's Got the Whole World in His Hands" which he heard when visiting a church service in Leesville, Louisiana. He worked extensively in Mexico with the Trío Calaveras, becoming known there as "El Charro Guero" (the blond cowboy). Working with song collector Percy Jones, he also performed and popularised many previously forgotten Australian folk songs. He recorded over 40 albums, on a variety of labels. These include Folk Songs and Ballads (1957), Click Go the Shears (1960), Stories in Song (1961), William Clauson sjunger Carl Michael Bellman (1963), and William Clauson Sings With His Latin American Trio Los Guaramex (1965).

In the late 1960s he opened a Mexican restaurant in Stockholm, before returning to live in the US, where he began collecting and performing cowboy songs. He later moved to live in Tijuana, Mexico, where he died in September 2017.

== Discography ==
Clauson published the following recordings.

- Folk Songs with John Gregory and his group (RCA Victor, 1956)
- Folk Songs and Ballads (His Master's Voice, 1957)
- Clauson in Mexico! (Capitol, 1958)
- Click Go the Shears (1960)
- Stories in Song (1961)
- William Clauson sjunger Carl Michael Bellman (1963)
- Swedish Songs (MGM, 1964)
- William Clauson Sings With His Latin American Trio Los Guaramex (1965)
- An Evening at El Sombrero (Polydor, 1967)
- William Clauson with the Mariachi Sound (Polydor, 1971)
- Jag Är På Väg (with Rune Eliasson, 1972)
- He's Got The Whole World In His Hands (with the Delta Rhythm Boys, Nett, 1974)
- Scandinavia! (Monitor, 1974)
- Evert Taube Favoriter (Polydor, n.d.)
- A Guitar A Voice In Songs Of Love (with Ulf Göran Åhslund, RCA Victor, n.d.)
- Folk Songs of Scandinavia (His Master's Voice, n.d.)
- A Clauson Concert (His Master's Voice, n.d.)
- All Among the Wool Boys (RCA, n.d.)
- Serenaden I Prästgatan (with Evert Taube, Polydor, n.d.)
- Treasury of Folk Songs (SMC, n.d.)
