= Olof Åhlström =

Swedish civil servant, composer and music publisher

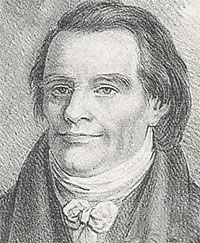
Olof Åhlström

Olof Åhlström (15 August 1756 – 11 August 1835) was a Swedish civil servant, composer and music publisher.

Åhlström was born in a peasant family in Vårdinge parish in Södermanland. He received early musical lessons from the parish organist but left his home at the age of sixteen to enroll in the Royal Academy of Music in Stockholm. He was appointed organist in the Stockholm parish of Maria Magdalena in 1777 and moved to Jakob parish in 1792. In addition to his professional life as a musician, he took a clerk's position in the War College, where in 1805 he reached the position of krigsråd ("War Councillor"). He retired from his position in the War College in 1824, but stayed as organist in Jakob until his death eleven years later.

His own compositions include a large number of songs, among them many poems by Anna Maria Lenngren, who was his sister-in-law, that he had set to music. These were published in several parts of Skalde-stycken satte i musik (1794–1823). He also composed a number of chorales, a cantata, fourteen sonatas, and an opera, Frigga (1787).

In 1788, Åhlström established Musikaliska Tryckeriet, the first larger-scale musical printing press in Sweden, and received a 20-year exclusive royal privilege for the engraving and printing of sheet music; anyone encroaching on his monopoly was to be fined 100 riksdaler. He introduced a new method of printing the sheets with types made from pewter with a small portion of lead. The method was cheaper than the copperplates previously used for the printing of music in Sweden, but was criticized for producing dark and dirty prints. The production of his press included compositions by Johan Wikmanson; Traditioner af swenska folk-dansar, folk dances collected and written down by Åhlström together with the folklore scholar Arvid August Afzelius; and fifteen parts of Musikaliskt tidsfördrif, a collection of pieces popular at the time, mostly for piano or song accompanied by piano. Åhlström also published the first edition of Carl Michael Bellman's song cycle Fredman's Epistles (1790) in collaboration with Bellman himself and the poet Johan Henrik Kellgren, who wrote an introduction and edited the song texts. Åhlström made arrangements of the songs for piano. It was followed in 1791 by Fredman's Songs, a collection of songs by Bellman not included among the Epistles. The relative influence of Kellgren and Åhlström over the final edition of both collections of songs, compared to that of the author, is a complex and partly unresolvable issue.

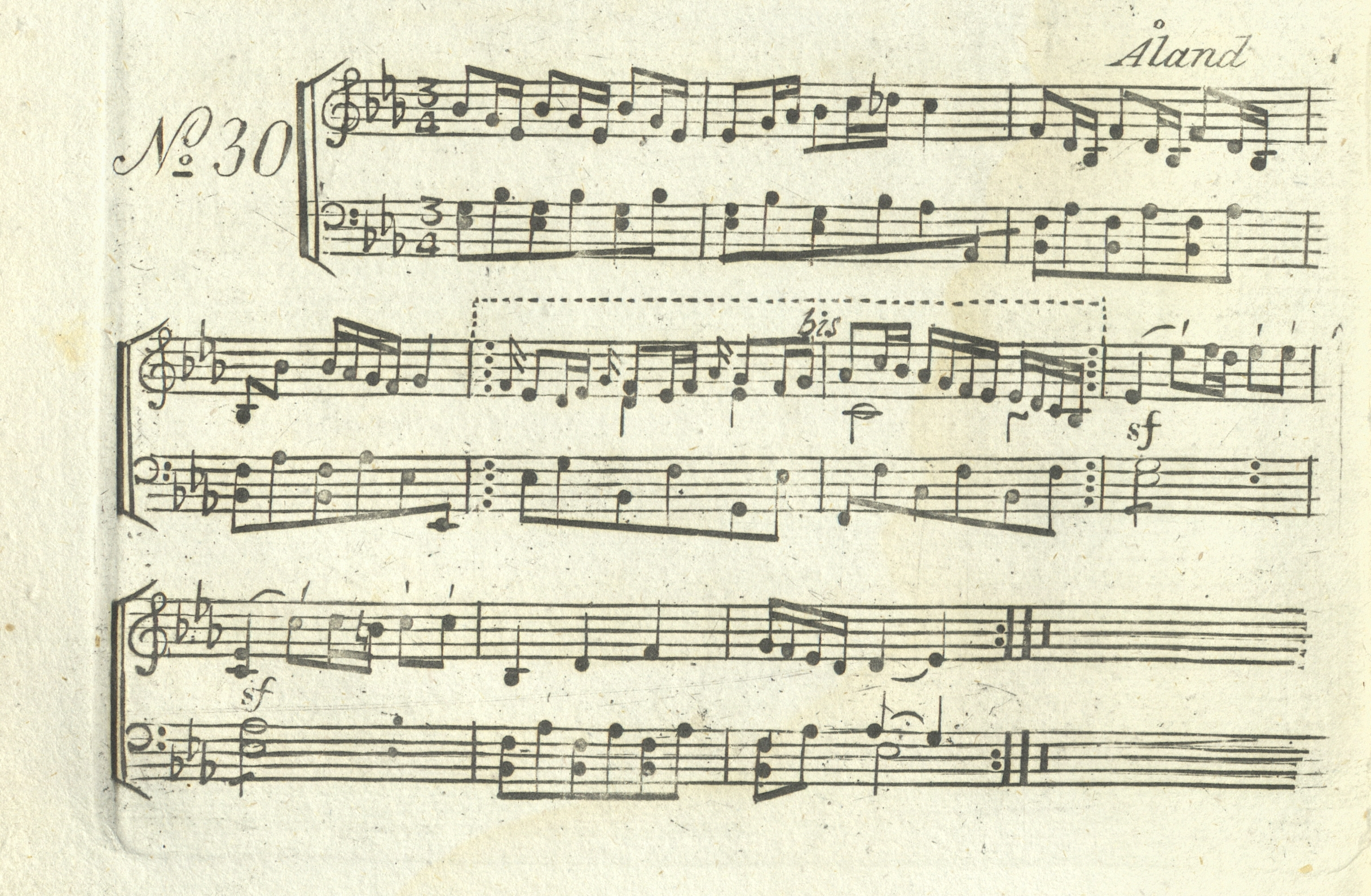
A folk tune from Åland. Traditioner af Swenska Folk-Dansar, third volume, p. 18.

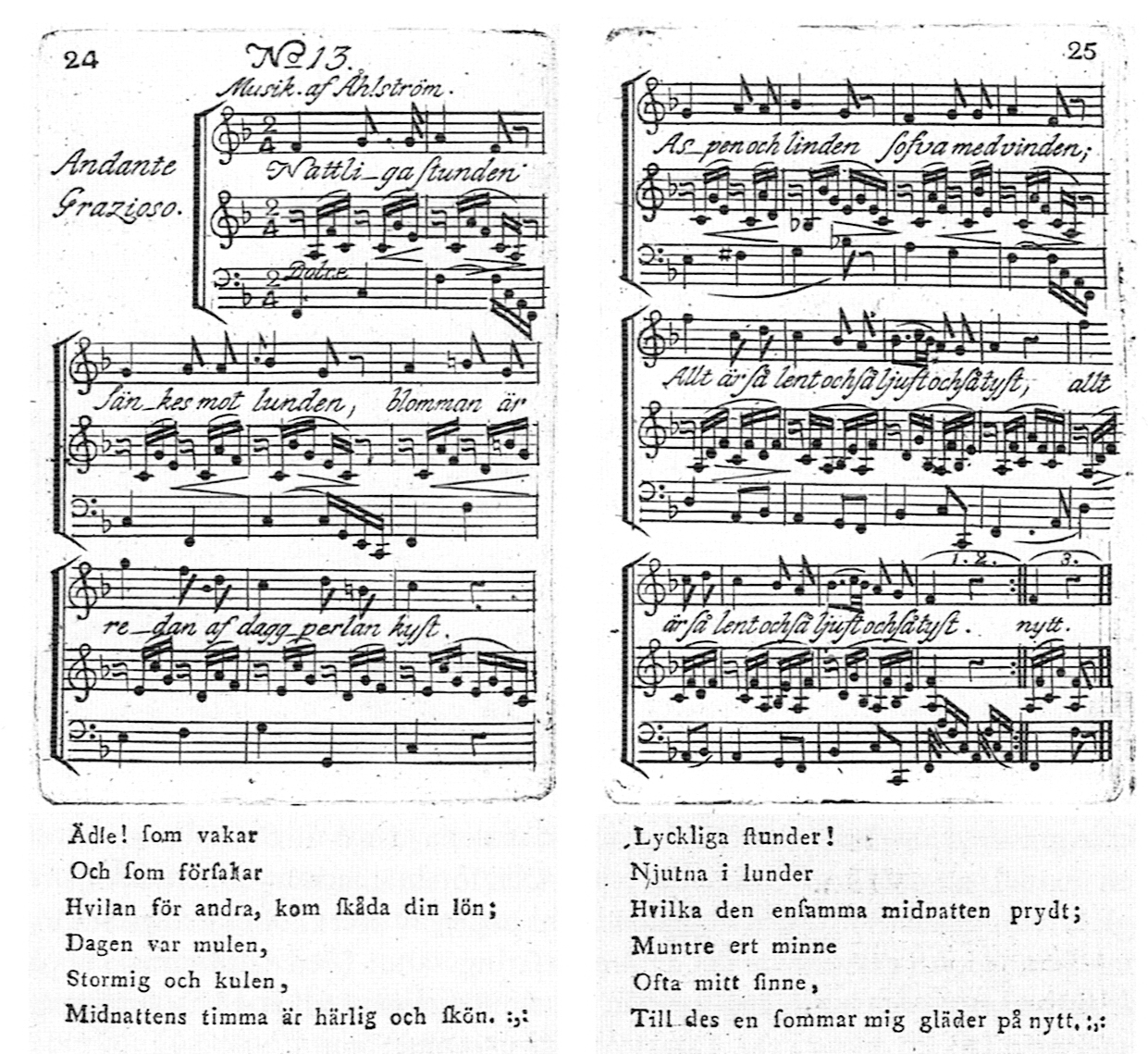
Skaldestycken satte i musik XI:13

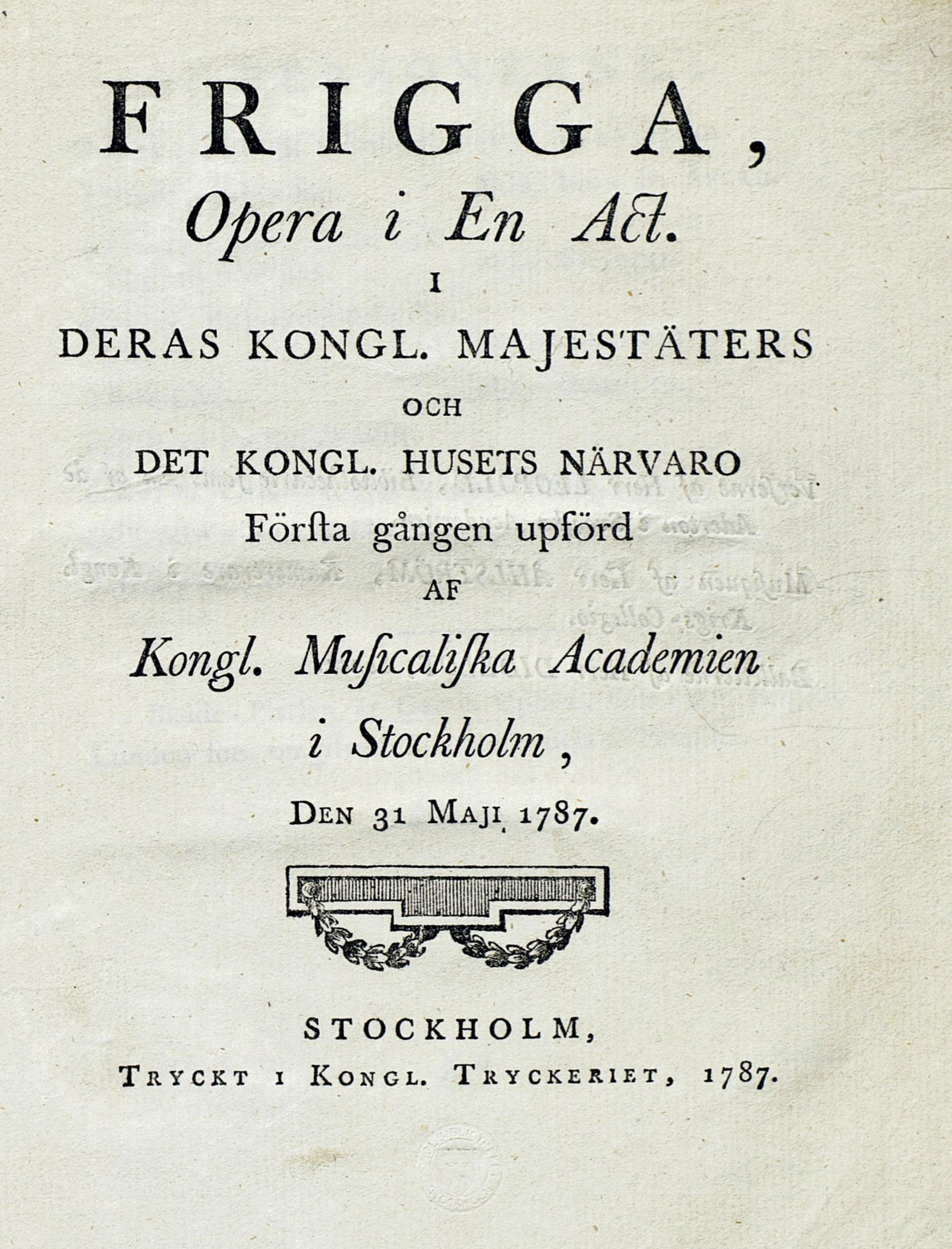
Title page: Frigga, opera i en act
