= Cornelis Vreeswijk discography =

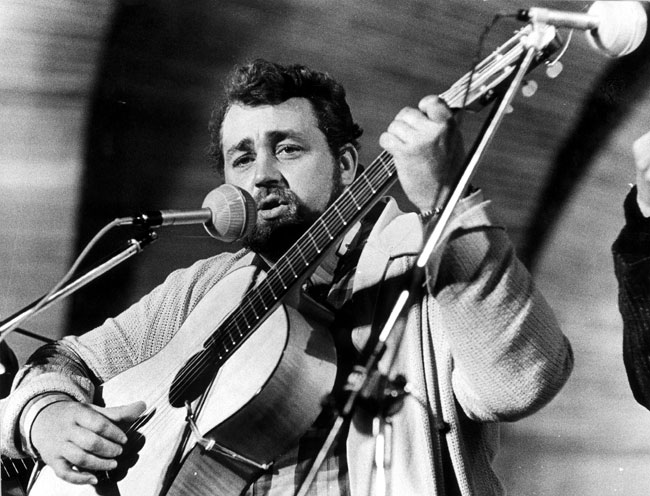
- Studio albums: 27
- Live albums: 7
- Compilation albums: 13

This article presents the Swedish discography of Cornelis Vreeswijk, Dutch-Swedish composer, singer, and guitar player.

== Studio albums ==
- 1964 - Ballader och oförskämdheter
- 1965 - Ballader och grimascher
- 1966 - Grimascher och telegram
- 1968 - Tio vackra visor och Personliga Person
- 1969 - Cornelis sjunger Taube
- 1970 - Poem, ballader och lite blues
- 1971 - Spring mot Ulla, spring! Cornelis sjunger Bellman
- 1972 - Visor, svarta och röda
- 1973 - Istället för vykort
- 1973 - Linnéas fina visor
- 1974 - Getinghonung
- 1976 - Narrgnistor och transkriptioner
- 1977 - Movitz! Movitz!
- 1978 - Cornelis sjunger Victor Jara
- 1978 - Narrgnistor 2, En halv böj blues och andra ballader
- 1978 - Felicia´s svenska suite
- 1979 - Vildhallon
- 1981 - Turistens klagan
- 1980 - En spjutkastares visor
- 1980 - Bananer - bland annat
- 1981 - Cornelis sjunger Povel
- 1981 - Hommager och Pamfletter
- 1985 - Mannen som älskade träd
- 1986 - I elfte timmen
- 1987 - Till Fatumeh - Rapport från de osaligas ängder

== Live albums ==
- 1965 - Visor och oförskämdheter
- 1972 - Östen, Enrst-Hugo & Cornelis på börsen
- 1972 - Cornelis live!
- 1979 - Cornelis - Live. Montmartre-Köpenhamn Vol 1
- 1979 - Cornelis - Live. Montmartre-Köpenhamn Vol 2
- 1979 - Cornelis - Live. Montmartre-Köpenhamn
- 1979 - Jazz incorporated

== Compilations and posthumous albums ==
- 1978 - Från narrgnistor och transkriptioner och Linnéas fina visor
- 1985 - Cornelis Bästa
- 1990 - Cornelis sjunger Bellman och Forssell
- 1993 - Mäster Cees memoarer|Mäster Cees memoarer vol. 1–5
- 1995 - Cornelis på Mosebacke
- 1996 - Guldkorn från Mäster Cees memoarer
- 1998 - Gömda guldkorn
- 2000 - Till sist
- 2000 - Bellman, Taube och lite galet
- 2000 - En fattig trubadur
- 2001 - Guldkorn: En rolig jävel
- 2001 - Guldkorn: Romantikern
- 2001 - Guldkorn: Samhällskritikern
- 2002 - Black girl
- 2003 - Bästa (Cornelis Vreeswijk samlingsalbum)|Bästa
- 2004 - Cornelis i Saltis
- 2007 - CV Det Bästa Med Cornelis Vreeswijk
