= Cornelis (film) =

- Directed by: Amir Chamdin
- Written by: Antonia Pyk
- Produced by: Martina Stöhr
- Starring: Hans Erik Dyvik Husby; Malin Crépin; Helena af Sandeberg; David Dencik; Johan Glans
- Cinematography: Crille Forsberg
- Edited by: Gregers Dohn
- Music by: Jack Vreeswijk
- Production companies: Chamdin & Stöhr Film
- Distributed by: Svensk Filmindustri
- Release date: 12 November 2010
- Running time: 101 minutes
- Country: Sweden
- Languages: Swedish; Dutch

Cornelis is a 2010 Swedish biographical drama film directed by Amir Chamdin, about the life of the musician Cornelis Vreeswijk. The soundtrack of the film was composed by Cornelis' son Jack Vreeswijk.

Vreeswijk is portrayed by Hans Erik Dyvik Husby, also known as Hank Von Helvete, former lead singer in the Norwegian rock band Turbonegro. The film centres on Vreeswijk's refuge to Sweden when he was a child and his radical political views, alcoholism and taste for women in his adulthood. The film's premiere in Sweden was 12 November 2010. David Dencik was nominated for a Guldbagge Award for his portrayal of the folk musician Fred Åkerström.

== Cast ==
- Hans Erik Dyvik Husby as Cornelis Vreeswijk
- Malin Crépin as Ingalill Rehnberg
- Helena af Sandeberg as Bim Warne
- David Dencik as Fred Åkerström
- Johan Glans as Anders Burman
- Frida Sjögren as Anita Strandell
- Vera Vitali as Ann-Christin Wennerström
- Pernilla Andersson as Ann-Louise Hanson
- Louis Fellbom as Jack Vreeswijk
- Adrian Munoz Nordqvist as young Cornelis Vreeswijk
- Fabian Fourén as 6 years old Jack Vreeswijk

== Reception ==
The film was generally well received. Svenska Dagbladet stated that the film was made with a "tremendous attention to detail" and that the actors "significantly portrayed" their characters. Aftonbladet stated that Chamdin is "a poetic film narrator who delivers a touching picture of an unusual man", but that the film "tries to show too much, a whole life, at the same time as it shows too little".
