= Sture Nordin =

- Born: Karl Sture Nordin; 11 November 1933; Östersund, Sweden
- Died: 11 October 2000 (aged 66) Stockholm
- Genres: Jazz
- Occupation: Musician
- Instrument: Double bass

Sture Nordin (11 November 1933 – 11 October 2000) was a leading Swedish jazz bassist.

After playing with Lars Gullin's orchestra, he joined Putte Wickman's sextet in 1955 before going on to join a trio with Rune Ofverman and Egil Johansen. Admitted to the Royal Swedish Academy of Music, together with Lasse Petterson and Georg Riedel, Nordin was expelled when it was found out that he was playing jazz.

He accompanied several visiting musicians on their visits to Sweden, including Sonny Boy Williamson II (Rice Miller), Josh White, Ben Webster, Dexter Gordon, Clark Terry, Johnny Griffin, Benny Bailey, Gábor Szabó and Dick Morrissey, as well as playing regularly with other leading Swedish jazz musicians, such as Jan Johansson, Rolf Ericson, Jan Allan, and Arne Domnérus.

== Discography ==
=== As leader/co-leader ===
- 1978: African Igloo
- 1979: Brazilian Igloo
- 1979: Nordin på Bolaget

=== As sideman ===
- 1966: Grimascher och telegram – Cornelis Vreeswijk
- 1968: Tio vackra visor och Personliga Person – Cornelis Vreeswijk
- 1969: The Sound of Surprise – Live at the Pawnshop – Putte Wickman
- 1972: Small World – Gábor Szabó
- 1975: Don't Get Around Much Anymore – Live at Bullerbyn
- 1978: Cornelis sjunger Victor Jara – Cornelis Vreeswijk
- 1983: Glad, Koonix! - Lee Konitz
