= Monica Törnell =

Swedish singer-songwriter (born 1954)

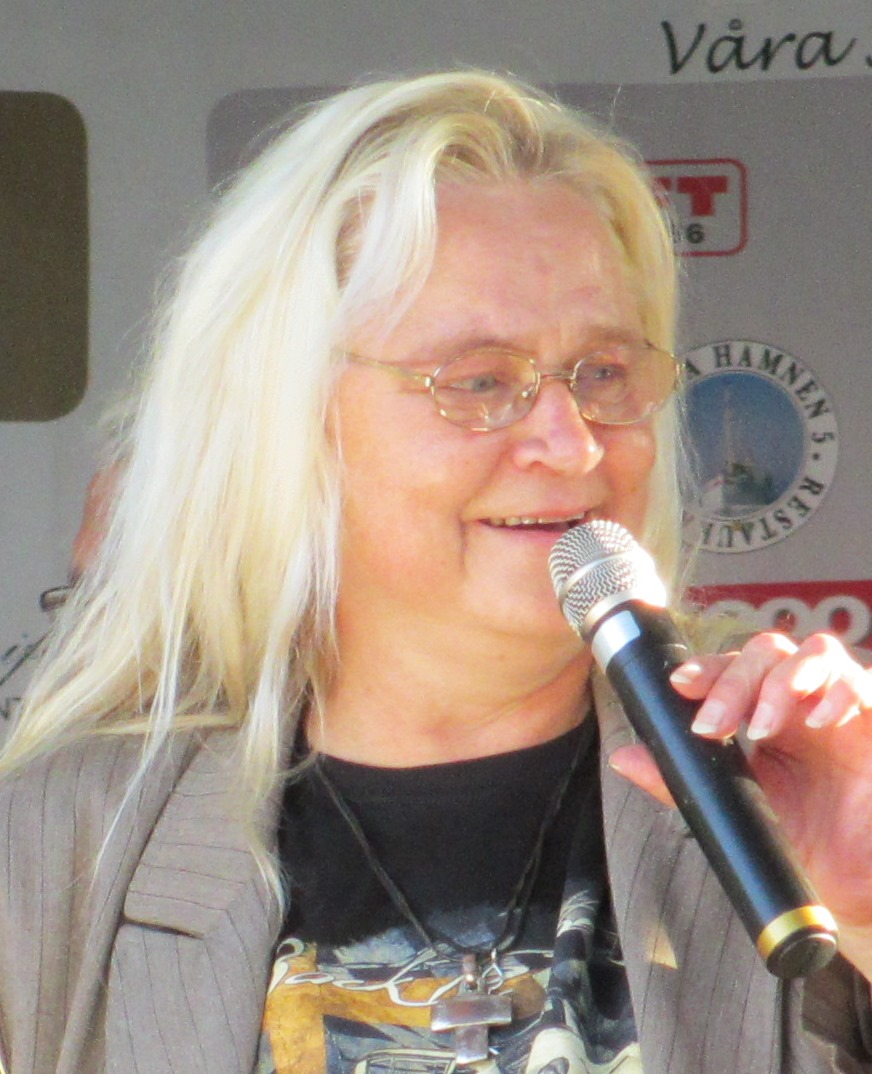

Background information
- Born: Monica Kristina Ingeborg Törnell; 3 June 1954 (age 72); Söderhamn, Sweden
- Genres: Folk, rock, pop
- Occupations: Singer, Songwriter
- Years active: 1972–
- Labels: Phonogram Records (Philips Records, Mercury Records), Air Chrysalis Scandinavia
- Website: www.monicatornell.se (in Swedish)

Monica Kristina Ingeborg Törnell (born 3 June 1954 in Söderhamn) is a Swedish singer and songwriter who mainly plays folk and rock music. With Lasse Holm, she represented Sweden in the Eurovision Song Contest 1986 with the song "E' de' det här du kallar kärlek?" In 2022, she was inducted in to the Swedish Musical Hall of Fame.

== Biography ==
=== Early life ===
Monica Törnell lived her first years in Trönö in the Norrala municipality before moving with her family to Söderhamn, where she was exposed to artists such as Lill-Babs and Jerry Williams during visits to Folkets Park. In 1962 she sang at the Ericsson Christmas party in front of 700 of her father's colleagues. This was her first public performance. In 1965 she was one of five first-prize winners in the Ung Fantasi (Young Fantasy) drawing competition. In her early teens she played the fiddle and sang both solo and with a choir. In the late 1960s, she was in the singing groups He, She and You and TJI. These groups consisted only of guitars and bass and sang mostly American folk music. On 20 February 1971, she won a vocalist contest in the Ljusne society in Söderhamn singing Summertime. By this point, she was well-known locally.

=== Career ===
In 1971 Törnell sang at the opening of her father's restaurant in Söderhamn, where she was discovered by Cornelis Vreeswijk. She quit her studies as a photography student, and during the latter part of 1971 embarked on a tour of Sweden and Denmark with Vreeswijk and musicians Björn J:son Lindh, Palle Danielsson, Kenny Håkansson, Björn Ståbi and Pers Hans Olsson. Vreeswijk arranged a demo and presented it to Phonogram Records, who offered Törnell a recording contract for a single. She turned it down because she wanted to make an LP, which she did later in 1972. The folk LP, titled Ingica, was issued by Phonogram on the Philips Records label. Around this time, Törnell appeared on the television programmes Halvsju and Strapetz, allowing her to reach a wider audience.

On 10 July 1972, she performed at Visfestivalen in Västervik and subsequently appeared on Vreeswijk's 1972 album Visor, svarta och röda and on Ola Magnell's 1974 LP Påtalåtar. She released her second LP, Alrik, in 1973. Both Ingica and Alrik were produced by former Tages drummer Lasse Svensson. That same year, she made a number of appearances with Tomas Ledin and sang the leitmotif to Per Oscarsson's film Ebon Lundin (1973) with Arne Olsson's big band Vieux Carré. In the mid-1970s, Törnell toured with her band, which was made up of Henrik "Hempo" Hildén (of Splash) on drums, Per Sydén on bass guitar, and her brother Bobo on guitar. In 1975 she released the English-language album Don't Give a Damn, produced by Björn J:son Lindh and featuring several members of Splash. The album was a shift from her image as a folksinger. In 1977 Törnell released another English-language album, Bush Lady, recorded in the UK and produced by Stephen Franckevich. Both achieved little success, due in part to the widespread Progg movement, during which English-language music was less popular. Her voice was compared by the media to that of Melanie Safka and Janis Joplin, and she identified chanson as her inspiration.

In October 1977 she performed at the feminist music festival Kvinnokulturfestivalen in Stockholm. In 1978 she and the group New Band released the LP Jag är som jag är..., produced by Björn J:son Lindh. This was more successful than her English-language albums, particularly the song "En kungens man." Dagens Nyheter awarded Törnell with the Kasper Prize for the album. In July, she appeared at Visfestivalen, and sang Tom Lehrer's "We Will All Go Together When We Go" on the 1979 compilation album Nej till kärnkraft! (No to nuclear power!), which was assembled by artists ahead of the 1980 Swedish nuclear power referendum. Following this was Törnell's third album, Ingica Mångrind, which featured New Band and was self-produced.

By the early 1980s, Törnell was increasingly writing her own songs. Her 1982 album Ängel began a long collaboration with the producer Ulf Wahlberg, keyboardist for Secret Service. She appeared on the compilation albums Z (1982) and Weine Renliden and His All Stars (1983) and in 1984 released the LP Mica and the album Fri. Around this time, she moved to the record company Air Music, led by Sture Borgedahl. By the mid-1980s, she was one of Air Music's most successful artists. In November 1985, she appeared at the ANC Gala in Gothenburg. In 1986 she and Lasse Holm released the song "E' de' det här du kallar kärlek?", which won first place in the Melodifestivalen and fifth place in the Eurovision Song Contest. She and Janne Schaffer co-produced her next album, Big Mama (1986), which featured Steve Marriott. This was followed by two more albums, Månfred (1988) and Vive la Mystique (1989), both produced by Ulf Wahlberg. She sang at Visfestivalen in 1985, 1986, 1988 and 1989 before health problems forced her to take a step back from performing. In 1998, she appeared on the television programme Livslust to share that, after nearly a decade of diagnostic testing and being largely bedridden, she had been diagnosed with myalgic encephalomyelitis/chronic fatigue syndrome, among other illnesses. She was also diagnosed with hypothyroidism in 2001.

In the 1990s and 2000s, she contributed songs to several compilation albums and occasionally sang at events, such as Visfestivalen in 1991 and 1994, a charity gala in Gävle Concert Hall in 1999; and at Cornelis Day in Stockholm in 2001. She became active as a visual artist, exhibiting oil paintings in Söderhamn and Sundsvall, and appeared as a weaver in Astrid Lindgren's Mio, My Son at the Royal Dramatic Theatre in 1997. She also wrote and sold educational computer programs, translated early e-books, taught courses at Berghs School of Communication, and founded the magazine The Art Bin. She was given the Ejnar Westling Award in 2003. In 2004, she appeared with Dr. Feelgood on the compilation album Rendezvous with "I'm So Happy," a previously unreleased song she had written in the early 1980s. She has since performed at the local Söderhamn Days and at a charity gala for the victims of the 2004 Indian Ocean earthquake, and was part of the music project Mother, led by Per Forsgren, formerly of Gävle. This resulted in the album LP in 2008. She was given the Legitimerad legend award in 2014, was inducted into the Swedish Music Hall of Fame in 2022 and received the Cornelispriset in 2024. In 2017 she released Understanding Eye, her first album of newly recorded material in 25 years.

== Personal life ==
Törnell is the single mother of two sons, Tobias (born 1978) and Mattias (born 1980).

== Discography ==
=== Solo works ===
Title	Year	Catalog number	Notes	Refs
Ingica	1972	Philips 6316 017		
Alrik	1973	Philips 6316 033		
"Long Long Weekend / Give It Back"	1974	Philips 6015 107	7"	
"I'm in Love with a Big pig Frog / Sam Hill"	1975	Philips 6015 158; Phonogram 6015 158 (promo)	7"	
Don't Give a Damn	1975	Philips 6316 052		
Bush Lady	1977	Mercury 6363 011		
"Katastrofen/ Snowcold Day"	1977	Mercury 6062 037	7"	
Jag är som jag är...	1978	Philips 6316 108		
Ingica Mångrind	1979	Philips 6316 123		
"En liten aning om helvetet / Ängel"	1981	Mercury 6016 053	7"	
Ängel	1982	6362 Mercury 088		
Mica	1984	Air AIRLP 1013		
Fri	1984	Air AIRLP 1015		
"Vintersaga / Krig"	1984	AIRS 018	7"	
"Känslan i maj / Nu lever jag igen"	1984	AIRS 020	7"	
"Fri / Bidar min tid"	1984	AIRS 023	7"	
"Nio liv (club mix) / Nio liv (radio mix) / Nio liv (dubbmix)"	1985	AIRS 025 MAX	12"	
Big Mama (Monica Törnell album)	1986	Air AIRLP 1019		
Förut...	1986	Air AIRLP 1021	Selected from older albums	
"Mellan raderna (Kom till mig) / Du måste så för att få skörd"	1986	AIRS 035	7"	
"Jag visste så väl / Ensam"	1987	RCA PB 60275	7"	
"Vind skall komma / En enda timma"	1988	RCA PB 60281	7"	
"På andra sidan midnatt / På kanten av ett stup"	1988	Bozz BOS 1016	7"	
Månfred	1988	RCA PD 71635		
Vive la Mystique	1989	V.I.P. VCD 5001		
"Vive la Mystique / Resan"	1989	V.I.P. VS 1002	7"	
"Någonting (get-down-mix, BPM 120) / Någonting (radio-version) / Kastar mina svärd"	1990	V.I.P. VMX 1001	12"	
Äppelkväll	1992	Locomotion LOCO C-124		
"Blå / Äppelkväll / Därför kan jag inte sova"	1992	Locomotion LOCO PRO-2	Promo CD	
Monica Törnell - svenska popfavoriter	1996	Karussell 552 566–2	Selected from older albums	
Understanding Eye	2017			

=== As part of Mother ===
Title	Year	Catalog number	Refs
LP	2008	Mother Songs MOLP-1	

=== With other artists ===
Title	Year	Other artist(s)	Catalog number	Notes	Refs
Visor, svarta och röda	1972	Cornelis Vreeswijk	Philips 6316 018	Duet with Vreeswijk: "Jenny Jansson"	
Påtalåtar	1974	Ola Magnell	Metronome MLP 15504	Duet with Magnell: "Man ska vara två"	
Sånger och musik från Kvinnokulturfestivalen	1977	Various	Silence SRS 4647	Compilation	
Visfestivalen Västervik 1978	1978	Various	Polydor 2379167	Compilation	
Nej till kärnkraft!	1979	Various	MNW 99P	Compilation; song: "We Will All Go Together When We Go"	
Mamma, låt inte din grabb växa upp till cowboy	1982	Örjan Englund	Election ELOLP 1101		
Z	1982	Zetterberg & Co.	Tredje tåget TTLP 2		
Weine Renliden and His All Stars	1983	Weine Renliden	Trumpet TLP 305		
Ge mig mer	1984	Ted Ström	Sonet SLP-2753		
Scener	1985	Per Gessle	EMI 1361911	Duet with Gessle: "Rickie Lee"	
Full Hand	1985	Lasse Wellander	CMM Records CMLP 102	Song: "Hav utan hamn"	
Visfestivalen i Västervik 20 år	1985	Various	Sonet SLPD-2098	Compilation	
ANC-galan. Svensk rock mot apartheid	1985	Various	Amalthea NLP 2001	Compilation	
"Cecilia / På samma hotell" (single)	1985	Roger Rönning	RAIRS 004		
"E' de' det här du kallar kärlek / En kärleksmagi" (single)	1986	Lasse Holm	Mariann MAS 2454		
"Canelloni, Macaroni (Pizzeria Fantasia) / Another Kind of Loving" (single)	1986	Lasse Holm	Mariann MAS 2456		
"Another Kind of Loving / E' de' det här du kallar kärlek" (single)	1986	Lasse Holm	Hansa 108 249 (W German); Dureco Benelux 5127 (Dutch)		
Stråk	1986	Ted Ström	Frituna FRLP-218		
Man överbord	1987	Björn Holm	EMI 1362591		
Eldorado. Äventyret fortsätter...	1987	Various	Sonet SLP 2788	Compilation; song: "I Can See You" by Don Henley and Mike Campbell	
Den flygande holländaren	1988	Various	EMI 7910922	Tribute compilation honoring Cornelis Vreeswijk; three songs, including "Ågren"	
Så skön som solen	1989	Putte Wickman & Ivan Renliden	AIRLP 1029	As a composer	
"After Ski: Låt oss bygga en bro / Hermann"	1989	Various	Bozz BOS 1047	For the Swedish Ski Association	
"Här för dig / Jag har en vän" (single)	1992	Twang	Start Klart SKRCDS-011		
Välkommen hit	1992	Twang	Start Klart SKRCD-011		
På ruinens brant	1995	Various	Gazelle GAFCD-1003	Compilation	
Lasse Holm In Da Mix	1995	Lasse Holm	Columbia	Promo, maxisingel, medley of songs	
Fjellis - till och från en blå man	1999	Various	Playground PGMCD 3	Tribute album to Jan-Eric "Fjellis" Fjellström; song: "Pilträd gråt för mig"	
Rendezvous	2004	Various	Darrow BAM-334-21573	Compilation; song with Dr. Feelgood: "I'm So Happy"	
Vildvuxna rosor	2005	Thorsten Flinck	Bonnier Amigo Music BAM-334-22231	Duet with Flinck: "Här och nu"	
Whatever Colors You Have in Your Mind	2007	Various	Darrow BAM-334-41873	Tribute album to Bob Dylan; song: "When I Paint My Masterpiece"	

Awards and achievements
Preceded by Kikki Danielsson with "Bra vibrationer"	Sweden in the Eurovision Song Contest (with Lasse Holm); 1986	Succeeded by Lotta Engberg with "Boogaloo"
