= Cornelis sjunger Taube =

Studio album by Cornelis Vreeswijk
- Released: 1969
- Genre: Folk music Protest music Swedish folk music
- Length: 34:14
- Label: Metronome
- Producer: Anders Burman

Cornelis Vreeswijk chronology
Tio vackra visor och Personliga Person (1968)	Cornelis sjunger Taube (1969)	Poem, ballader och lite blues (1970)

Cornelis sjunger Taube (English: Cornelis sings Taube) is the fifth studio album by Swedish-Dutch folk singer-songwriter Cornelis Vreeswijk. This album is homage to Evert Taube (1890–1976), author, artist, composer and singer.

== Track listing ==
Music and lyrics by Evert Taube unless otherwise noted

1. "Den sjuttonde balladen"
2. "Byssan lull" (Trad./Taube)
3. "Den glade bagarn i San Remo"
4. "Dansen på Sunnanö"
5. "Nudistpolka"
6. "Skärgårdsfrun"
7. "Ingrid Dardels polska"
8. "Vals i Valparaiso"
9. "Och skulle det så vara" (Gunnar Gahn/Taube)
10. "Oxdragarsång"
11. "Cervantes (Gunnar Ekelöf/Taube)
12. "Fritiof Anderssons paradmarsch"
13. "Jag är fri, jag har sonat"
