= Grimascher och telegram =

Studio album by Cornelis Vreeswijk
- Released: 1966
- Genres: Folk music Protest music Swedish folk music
- Length: 34:09
- Label: Metronome
- Producer: Anders Burman

Cornelis Vreeswijk chronology
Ballader och grimascher (1965)	Grimascher och telegram (1966)	Tio vackra visor och Personliga Person (1968)

Grimascher och telegram (English: Grimaces and telegram) is the third studio album by the Swedish-Dutch folk singer-songwriter Cornelis Vreeswijk. It is a more jazz-oriented album.

== Track listing ==
Music and lyrics by Cornelis Vreeswijk unless otherwise noted

1. Telegram för en bombad by
2. Cylinderhatten
3. Jubelvisa över Fiffiga Nanette
4. Telegram för Lucidor
5. En visa om ett rosenblad
6. Medborgarinnan Agda Gustavssons lott (duet with Ann-Louise Hanson)
7. Polaren Per är kärlekskrank
8. Ångbåtsblues
9. Telegram för en tennsoldat
10. Får jag presentera Fiffiga Nanette?
11. Jag hade en gång en båt (trad. Bahamian, "Sloop John B"; Vreeswijk; duet with Ann-Louise Hanson)
12. "Balladen om herr Fredrik Åkare och den söta fröken Cecilia Lind" (trad. American, "Monday Morning"; Vreeswijk)
13. Telegram för min värdinna
14. Telegram för fullmånen

== Personnel ==
- Cornelis Vreeswijk - vocals, acoustic guitar
- Jan Johansson - piano
- Rune Gustafsson - guitar
- Sture Nordin - acoustic bass
- Egil Johansen - drums
- Ann-Louise Hanson - vocals
