= Stöd de strejkande hamnarbetarna =

Studio album by Various Artists
- Released: 1974
- Genres: Folk music Protest music Swedish folk music
- Label: Proletärkultur Records

Stöd till de strejkande hamnarbetarna (English: Support the harbour workers on strike) is an album by Swedish folk artists in support to harbour strike in 1974 in Gothenburg, Sweden. Fred Åkerström sings three songs on this album and the famous actor Sven Wollter sings a song about members of parliament.

== Track listing ==
1. Thomas Ellerås - Den gamla goda tiden (2:00)
2. Harald - Strejka (4:11)
3. Knutna Nävar - Balladen om Olsson (av Nja-Gruppen) (2:24)
4. Anja Svederborg - Katiusja (1:29)
5. Fred Åkerström - Rallarvisa (2:35)
6. Fred Åkerström - Åkare lundgrens begravning (3:50)
7. Fred Åkerström - En valsmelodi (4:31)
8. Mats Lundälv - Chartist song (3:51)
9. Mats Lundälv - Working on the project (3:54)
10. Sven Wollter - Riksdagsvisa (4:37)
11. Röda Ropet - Måsadott (2:22)
12. Dan Berglund - Visa till SAP (1:19)
13. Dan Berglund - De mördades fria republik (5:06)
