= Visor i närheten =

Studio album by Fred Åkerström
- Released: 1965
- Genre: Folk music Protest music Swedish folk music
- Label: Metronome

Fred Åkerström chronology
Visor och oförskämdheter (1964)	Visor i närheten (1965)	Doktor Dolittle (1965)

Visor i närheten (English: Nearby songs) is an album by the Swedish folk singer-songwriter and guitar player Fred Åkerström. This album includes Åkerström´s interpretations of Fritz Sjöström, Swedish folk composer, singer and artist.

== Track listing ==
1. Vindstilla vals
2. Närbild
3. Ögon
4. Hjärtslag
5. Olycklig kärlek
6. Monolog om julstjärnor
7. Barnmålning
8. Porträtt av en majstång
9. Rus
10. Närhet
11. Du där i jord
12. Brudbrödsbukett
