= Ballader och oförskämdheter =

Studio album by Cornelis Vreeswijk
- Released: 1964
- Genre: Folk music Protest music Swedish folk music
- Length: 31:10
- Label: Metronome
- Producer: Anders Burman

Cornelis Vreeswijk chronology
| Ballader och oförskämdheter (1964) | Visor och oförskämdheter (1965) |

Ballader och oförskämdheter (English: Ballads and impertinencies) is the debut studio album by Swedish-Dutch folk singer-songwriter Cornelis Vreeswijk. Initially, Vreeswijk's songs were about to be sung by his friend Fred Åkerström, who introduced him to the label Metronom; it was, however, decided that Cornelis Vreeswijk should sing the songs on his own. The album was a success and a good start of his career.

== Track listing ==
Songs have links to their lyrics on external site

1. Ballad på en soptipp - 2:41
2. Visa i vinden - 2:46
3. Halleluja, jag är frisk igen - 1:41
4. Lillsysterns undulat är död - 1:30
5. Ann-Katarin - 3:25
6. Häst-på-taket-William - 2:03
7. Tältet - 2:19
8. På grund av emigration - 2:45
9. Min polare Per - 2:15
10. Balladen om all kärleks lön - 2:02
11. Balladen om Fredrik Åkare - 2:26
12. Perfect time killer - 2:33
13. Vaggvisa" - 2:43

== Personnel ==
- Cornelis Vreeswijk - vocal, acoustic guitar
