= Turistens klagan =

Studio album by Cornelis Vreeswijk
- Released: 1980
- Genre: Folk music Protest music Swedish folk music
- Label: Universal Records

Cornelis Vreeswijk chronology
Vildhallon (1979)	Turistens klagan (1980)	En spjutkastares visor (1980)

Turistens klagan,(English: Tourist's lament) is a music album recorded by the Swedish–Dutch folk singer-songwriter Cornelis Vreeswijk in 1980. It is one half of the double concept album Felicia's svenska suite, which was originally issued only in Norway.

== Track listing ==
1. "Turistens klagan" (03:21)
2. "Till en nymf" (02:15)
3. "Från en vän i viken" (02:33)
4. "Tre dagars blues" (04:12)
5. "För gröna Felicia" (02:20)
6. "De fattiga riddarnas ballad" (02:50)
7. "Polaren Pär gör sin reverens" (01:31)
8. "Byt nu ton" (02:05)
9. "Balladen om Gustava" (03:40)
10. "Felicia – adjö" (02:53)
11. "Dubbelquatrin om tennis" (03:21)
12. "Möte med Fredrik Åkare, Stockholm 1943" (02:52)
13. "Felicia pratar" (02:20)
