= Dagsedlar åt kapitalismen =

Studio album by Fred Åkerström
- Released: 1967
- Genre: Folk music Protest music Swedish folk music
- Label: Metronome
- Producer: Anders Burman

Fred Åkerström chronology
Doktor Dolittle (1965)	Dagsedlar åt kapitalismen (1967)	Fred sjunger Bellman (1969)

Dagsedlar åt kapitalismen is an album by the Swedish folk singer-songwriter and guitar player Fred Åkerström.

== Track listing ==
1. Luffaren
2. Balladen om Bror Lundbom
3. Varning för hunden
4. Kapitalismen
5. Två gånger död
6. Halleluja amen
7. Kapital
8. Onkel Sam och den snälle gossen
9. Vaggvisa
10. För maskens skull
11. Prästen och slaven
12. Balladen om Joe Hill
