= Povea =

Povea is a surname. Notable people with the surname include:

- Amado Povea (born 1955), Cuban footballer
- Leonardo Povea (born 1994), Chilean footballer
- Liadagmis Povea (born 1996), Cuban triple jumper

== See also ==
- Povel
