= Vila vid denna källa (album) =

Studio album by Fred Åkerström
- Released: 1977
- Genres: Folk music Swedish folk music

Fred Åkerström chronology
| Bananskiva (1976) | Vila vid denna källa (1977) | Sjöfolk och landkrabbor (1978) |

Vila vid denna källa (English: Rest by this well) is an album by Swedish folk singer-songwriter and guitar player Fred Åkerström, named for an 18th-century song of the same name. It's a third album of Fred Åkerström's interpretations of Carl Michael Bellman's Fredman's Epistles.

== Track listing ==
Songs and lyrics by Carl Michael Bellman.

1. Epistle Nr 9: Käraste Bröder, Systrar och Vänner 3:38
2. Epistle Nr 82: Vila Vid Denna Källa 8:56
3. Epistle Nr 67: Fader Movitz Bror 3:06
4. Epistle Nr 43: Värm Mer Öl Och Bröd 3:22
5. Epistle Nr 45: Tjänare, Mollberg, Hur Är Det Fatt 3:48
6. Epistle Nr 33: Stolta Stad! 7:50
7. Epistle Nr 44: Movitz Helt Allena 4:27
8. Epistle Nr 31: Se Movitz, Vi Står Du Och Gråter 5:06
9. Epistle Nr 27: Gubben Är Gammal, Urverket Dras 3:04
