= Istället för vykort =

Studio album by Cornelis Vreeswijk
- Released: 1973
- Genre: Folk music Protest music Swedish folk music
- Label: YTF

Cornelis Vreeswijk chronology
Visor, svarta och röda (1972)	Istället för vykort (1973)	Linnéas fina visor (1974)

Istället för vykort (English: Instead of postcards) is a studio album by the Swedish-Dutch folk singer-songwriter Cornelis Vreeswijk. It is considered Vreeswijk's most political album.

== Track listing ==
1. "Till Sara Lidman"
2. "Till Jack"
3. "Till Lewi Petrus"
4. "Till damtidningen Femina"
5. "Till Cleo mellan dig och mig"
6. "Till Svenska Säkerhetspolisen"
7. "Till Jan Myrdal"
8. "Från fångarna på Kumla"
9. "Till Riddarhuset"
10. "Till Riksbanken"
11. "Till Landsorganisationen LO"
12. "Till hans Exellens Statsminister Olof Palme"
13. "Till en gammal knarkare"
14. "Till redaktör Ulf Thorén julhelgen 1972"
15. "Till Gunnel" (Bonus-låt på cd-utgåvan)

== Personnel ==
- Cornelis Vreeswijk: vocal, guitar
- Rune Gustafsson: guitar
- Janne Schaffer: guitar
- Hans Rosén: guitar
- Red Mitchell: bass
- Sabu Martinez: Conga
- Johnny Martinez: Conga
- Björn Ståbi: violin
- Jan Lindgren: Steel Guitar
