= Narrgnistor 2, En halv böj blues och andra ballader =

Studio album by Cornelis Vreeswijk
- Released: 1978
- Genre: Folk music Protest music Swedish folk music
- Label: Philips Records

Cornelis Vreeswijk chronology
Cornelis sjunger Victor Jara (1978)	Narrgnistor 2, En halv böj blues och andra ballader (1978)	Felicia's svenska suite (1978)

Narrgnistor 2, En halv böj blues och andra ballader, rätten till ett eget liv (English: Foolishnesses 2, A halv-bend blues and other ballads) is a music album recorded by the Swedish-Dutch folk singer-songwriter Cornelis Vreeswijk in 1978.

== Track listing ==
1. "Ballad om hurusom Don Quijote gick på en blåsning"
2. "Nalle Puhs getinghonung"
3. "Åh, va jag var lycklig i natt"
4. "Balladen om den väpnade tiggaren"
5. "Hej, hå!"
6. "Kors, vad fest i denna byn"
7. "Leka med elden"
8. "En halv böj blues"
9. "Fagermans visa"
10. "Ballad till en bra polis"
11. "'Håll Sverige rent', sa polaren Per"
12. "Ballad om en gammal knarkare"
13. "Sången om Britt"
14. "Fredrik Åkares morgonpsalm"

== Charts ==
Chart performance for Narrgnistor 2, En halv böj blues och andra ballader
Chart (1978)	Peak position
Swedish Albums (Sverigetopplistan)	39
