= Helena af Sandeberg =

Swedish actress

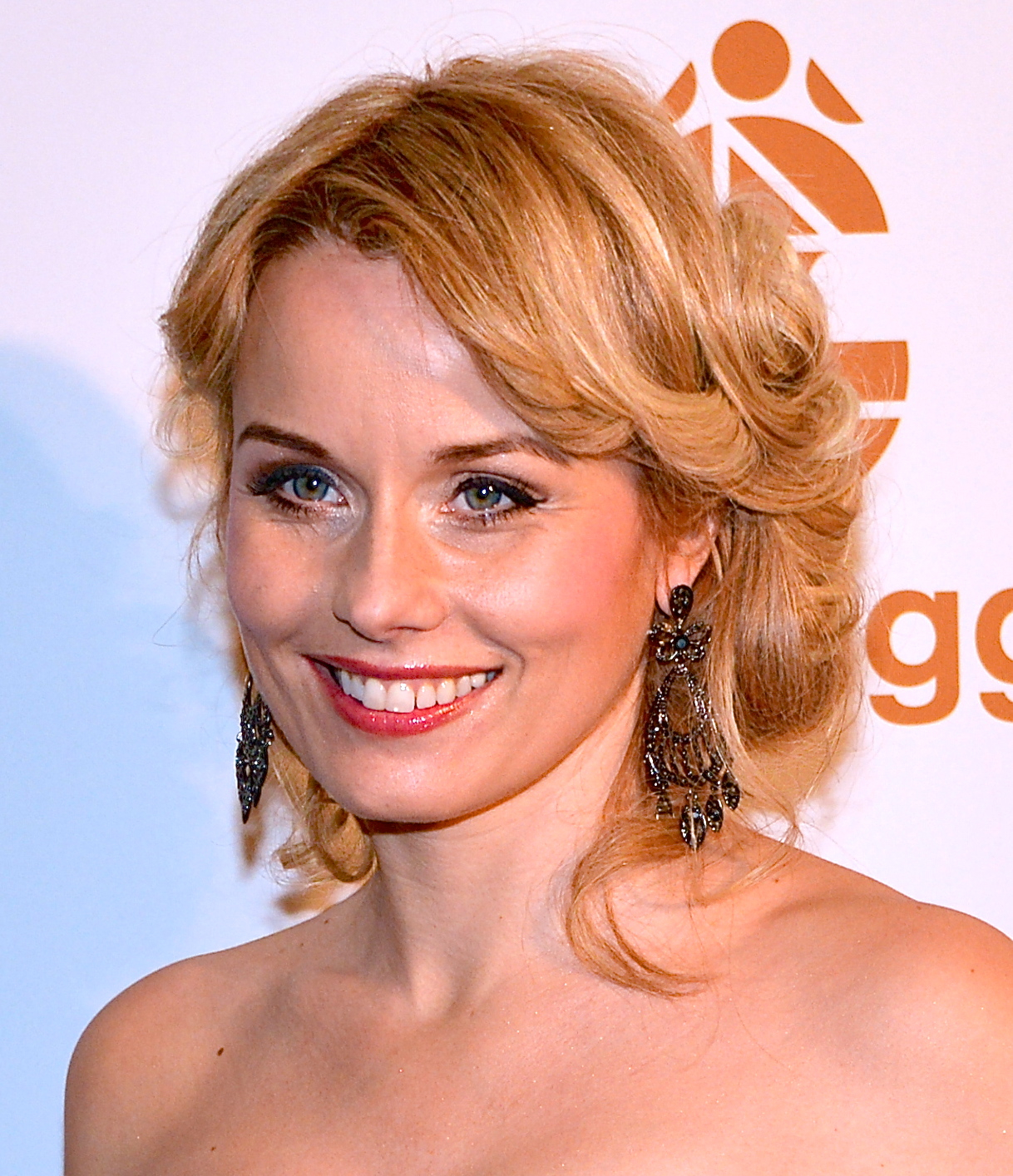
- af Sandeberg at Guldbaggegalan in 2013
- Born: Helena Beata Maria af Sandeberg; 1 September 1971 (age 55); Råsunda, Solna, Stockholm County, Sweden
- Occupation: Actress
- Years active: 1993–present
- Spouses: Alexander Mørk-Eidem (m. 2005; div. 2010) Fredrik Lycke (m. 2014; div. 2017)
- Partner: Eagle-Eye Cherry (1990–1998)
- Children: 2

Helena Beata Maria af Sandeberg (born 1 September 1971 in Solna) is a Swedish actress.

== Early life ==
Helena af Sandeberg was born on 1 September 1971 in Solna, Stockholm County, Sweden and grew up in Rotebro, Stockholm County, Sweden. She studied at Södra Latin in Stockholm and Actors Studio in New York. The af Sandeberg family is part of the Swedish untitled nobility.

== Career ==
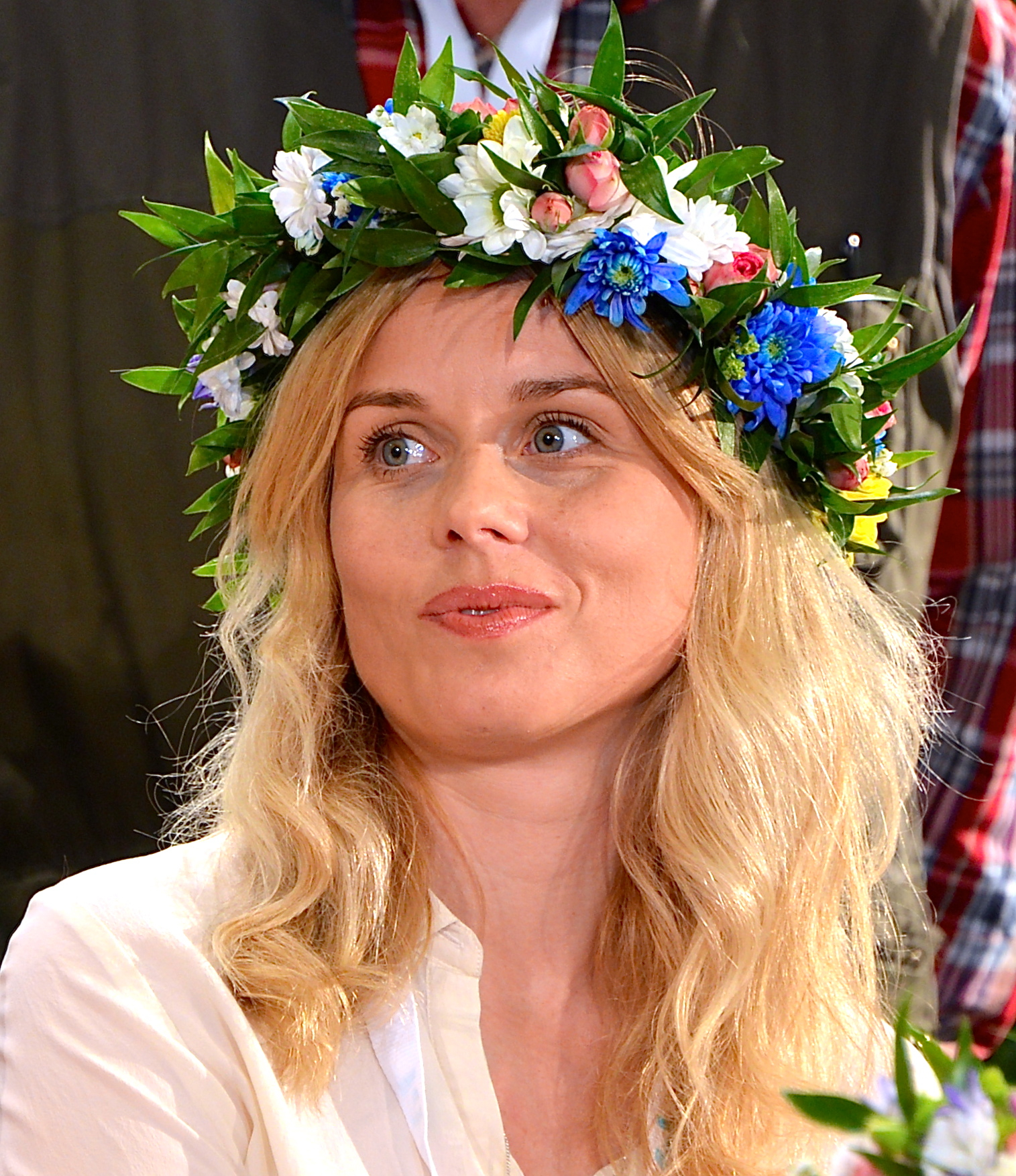
af Sandeberg at Sveriges Radio's Sommar i P1 in 2013.

In 2013, af Sandberg hosted the Sommar i P1 on SR P1 and appeared on SVT's Sommarpratarna in October 2014.

== Personal life ==
af Sandeberg was in a relationship with the musician Eagle-Eye Cherry, son of Don Cherry and half-brother of Neneh Cherry, between 1990 and 1998. From 2005 to 2010, af Sandeberg was married to the director Alexander Mørk-Eidem with whom she had a son, Alfred. In 2013, she married the actor and musician Fredrik Lycke and in 2014 their daughter was born. They divorced in 2017. She owns the production company Alfredo Film och teater AB.

== Selected filmography ==
- 1997 - Rederiet (TV)
- 1997 - 9 millimeter
- 1998 - Zingo
- 1999 - In Bed with Santa
- 1999 - Sjätte dagen (TV)
- 1999 - C/o Segemyhr (TV)
- 2002 - Heja Björn (TV)
- 2003 - Virus i paradiset (TV)
- 2003 - Tur & retur
- 2005 - Kim Novak badade aldrig i Genesarets sjö
- 2006 - Hombres (TV)
- 2008 - Oskyldigt dömd (TV)
- 2010 - Cornelis
- 2012 - The Hypnotist
- 2012 - Blondie
- 2019 – Quicksand (Netflix Series)
- 2021 – Dough (TV)
