= Linnéas fina visor =

Studio album by Cornelis Vreeswijk
- Released: 1973
- Genre: Folk music Protest music Swedish folk music
- Length: 40:20
- Label: Universal Records

Cornelis Vreeswijk chronology
Istället för vykort (1973)	Linnéas fina visor (1973)	Getinghonung (1974)

Linnéas fina visor (English: Linnea's fine songs) is a studio album by the Swedish-Dutch folk singer-songwriter Cornelis Vreeswijk.

== Track listing ==
1. En vacker visa till Linnéa
2. "Alices snaps"
3. "Till Mtukwa Rosa Lind"
4. "Linnéa i galopp"
5. "Bakvända visan"
6. "Silas' kalas"
7. "Ofelia plockar krasse"
8. "Polaren Per vid morgonstädningen"
9. Till Linnéa via Leonard Cohen
10. "Linnéas morgonpsalm"
11. "Balladen om bonden och djävulen"
12. "Blues för Ann-Katarin"

== Personnel ==
- Cornelis Vreeswijk – vocals, guitar
- Peter Nieuwerf – guitar
- Harry Mooten – accordion
- Gerrit Den Braber – backing vocals
- Willem de Vries – drums, percussion
- Piet Souer – harmonica
