= Vildhallon =

Studio album by Cornelis Vreeswijk
- Released: 1979
- Genre: Folk music Protest music Swedish folk music
- Label: Universal Records

Cornelis Vreeswijk chronology
Felicia's svenska suite (1978)	Vildhallon (1979)	Turistens klagan (1980)

Vildhallon (English: Wild raspberry) is a music album recorded by the Swedish-Dutch folk singer-songwriter Cornelis Vreeswijk in 1979.

== Track listing ==
1. "Vildhallon (Första brevet till Mäster Sändh)" - 3:13
2. "Billet d'amour till J.M." - 2:05
3. "Rosa, skola vi dansa?" - 2:26
4. "Balladen om den nya äktenskapslagen" - 3:04
5. "Till Svenska Akademien" - 2:31
6. "Fagermans visa" - 3:00
7. "Ballad till en bra polis" - 2:52
8. "Nu dagas det i öster" - 3:34
9. "Min tanke är fri" - 2:50
10. "Byt nu ton" - 1:53
11. "Ballad om Don Quixotes förvillelser" - 5:53
12. "Assistenten samtalar med Fredrik Åkare" - 5:42
13. "Christiania" - 5:32
14. "Bön" - 4:54
