= Getinghonung =

Studio album by Cornelis Vreeswijk
- Released: 1974
- Genre: Folk music Protest music Swedish folk music
- Length: 40:20
- Label: Universal Records

Cornelis Vreeswijk chronology
Linnéas fina visor (1974)	Getinghonung (1974)	Narrgnistor och transkriptioner (1976)

Getinghonung (English: Wasp's honey) is a 1974 album by Dutch-Swedish singer-songwriter Cornelis Vreeswijk.

== Track listing ==
Music and lyrics by Cornelis Vreeswijk unless otherwise noted.

1. "Jag och Bosse Lidén" (Me and Bobby McGee, Kris Kristofferson/C. Vreeswijk) – 3:55
2. "Shåwinistblues" – 2:35
3. "Getinghonung à la Flamande" (trad./C. Vreeswijk) – 4:10
4. "Kalle Holm" (The ballad of Hollis Brown, Dylan/Vreeswijk) – 3:00
5. "Polaren Per hos det sociala" – 3:35
6. "Vårvisa" (Monica Zetterlund/Gerrit den Braber) – 3:50
7. "Lill-Klas' elektriska bas" (Clyde, J. J. Cale/C. Vreeswijk) – 2:40
8. "Getinghonung à la Berzelii" – 4:25
9. "Po Rom Pom Po'n" (Juan Solano/C. Vreeswijk) – 3:50
10. "Den falska flickan" – 2:45
11. "Getinghonung Provençale" – 4:35
12. "Droskblues" (J. J. Cale/C. Vreeswijk) – 3:00

== Personnel ==
- Cornelis Vreeswijk — vocal, guitar
- Rune Gustafsson — guitar
- Sture Åkerberg — bass
- Janne Schaffer — guitar
- Knud Jörgensen — piano, conga
- Johan Dielemans — drums, tambourin, bonga
- Monica Zetterlund — vocal
- Jan Allan — trumpet
- Björn Ståbi — violin
- Ole Hjorth — violin
- Göte Wilhelmson — accordion
