= Homager och Pamfletter =

Studio album by Cornelis Vreeswijk
- Released: 1981
- Recorded: 1981
- Studio: Mastersound Studios, Skurup
- Genre: Folk music Protest music Swedish folk music
- Label: A-Disc
- Producer: Palle Budtz

Cornelis Vreeswijk chronology
Cornelis sjunger Povel (1981)	Homager och Pamfletter (1981)	Mannen som älskade träd (1985)

Homager och Pamfletter,(English: Homages and Pamphlets) is a music album recorded by the Swedish-Dutch folk singer-songwriter Cornelis Vreeswijk in 1981.

== Track listing ==
1. "Pamflett Nr 8 "Ballad om en lergök"
2. "Blues för ett torn (Papperskvarnen)"
3. "Luchin"
4. "Hommage"
5. "Blues för Jacques Brel"
6. "Till Julia"
7. "Sambaliten"
8. "Pamflett 53"
9. "Pamflett 68: Vals för ingens hundar"
10. "Pamflett nr 62: Ta en moralkaka till"
11. "Hommage för Sveriges Radio"
12. "Pamflett 31: "Blues för Göteborg"

== Personnel ==
- Cornelis Vreeswijk - vocal, guitar
- Conny Söderlund - guitar, vocal, rhythm instruments
- Owe Gustavsson - bass
