= Ballader och grimascher =

Studio album by Cornelis Vreeswijk
- Released: 1965
- Genre: Folk music Protest music Swedish folk music
- Length: 29:46
- Label: Metronome
- Producer: Anders Burman

Cornelis Vreeswijk chronology
| Visor och oförskämdheter (1964) | Ballader och grimascher (1965) | Grimascher och telegram (1966) |

Ballader och grimascher (English: Ballads and grimaces) is the second studio album by Swedish-Dutch folk singer-songwriter Cornelis Vreeswijk. The album was recorded in Metronome Studio with producer Anders Burman.

== Track listing ==
Music and lyrics by Cornelis Vreeswijk.

1. "Sportiga Marie"
2. "Ballad om censuren"
3. "Esmeralda"
4. "Ballad om 100 år"
5. "Horoskopsvisan"
6. "Lasse Liten blues"
7. "Jultomten är faktiskt död"
8. "Tänk om jag hade en sabel"
9. "Dekadans"
10. "Grimasch om morgonen"
11. "Balladen om ett munspel"
12. "Slusk-blues"

== Personnel ==
- Cornelis Vreeswijk - guitar, vocals
- Jan Johansson - piano
