= Povel =

Povel is a given name and a surname. People with that name include:

== Given name ==
- Povel Huitfeldt (c. 1520 - 1592), Danish-Norwegian governor-general of Norway
- Povel Juel (c. 1673 – 1723), Norwegian civil servant and writer
- Povel Pedersson Paus (1625-1682), Norwegian cleric
- Povel Ramel (1922-2007), Swedish entertainer

== Surname ==
- Bernard Povel (1897-1952), German politician
- Hans Povel (born c. 1954), retired Dutch rower
- Ferdinand Povel (born 1947), Dutch jazz saxophonist

== See also ==
- Povel district of Olomouc, Moravia, Czech Republic
- Cornelis sjunger Povel, a 1981 album by Cornelis Vreeswijk named after Povel Ramel
- Pavel, a given name and surname
