= Leif Fredriksson =

- Origin: Stockholm, Sweden
- Genres: Prog, Fusion, Jazz, Free form, Psychedelic
- Occupation: Musician
- Instrument: Drums
- Years active: 1972 -

Leif Fredriksson a Swedish drummer and a member of the Swedish group TRIO.

== Discography ==
=== TRIO ===
- From Nowhere to Eternity 2008, TRIO01

=== therhythmisodd ===
- Subway 2010, TRIO02
- Raw Material 2011, TRIO03
- Fly By Time, 2014,
- Fly by Time (extravaganza), 2018

== Other ==
=== Anders Karlen ===
- Way out 1981, MLR-20 (mistlur)

=== Dag Mattsson ===
- Don't force the level 1997

=== Egba ===
- Elektrobop 1985, DRLP80 (Dragon)
- Fuse 1983, MNW126P (MNW)
- Omen 1981, MNW115P (MNW)

=== Greg FitzPatrick ===
- Det Persiska Äventyret 1977, MNW 80P (MNW)

=== Monica Törnell ===
- Bush Lady 1977,

=== Monica Zetterlund ===
- Monica Z 1989,

=== Lulu Alke ===
- Lulu Alke 1994

=== Ulf Adåker / Swedish Radio Jazz Group ===
- Chordeography 1986. PS36 (Phono Suecia)

=== Gustavo Bergalli Quintet ===
- S/T 1986, DRLP 119 (DRAGON)
