= Till Fatumeh – Rapport från de osaligas ängder =

Till Fatumeh - Rapport från de osaligas ängder

Studio album by Cornelis Vreeswijk
- Released: 1987
- Recorded: September–October 1987
- Genre: Folk music Protest music Swedish folk music
- Label: Slager
- Producer: Per Alm, Silas Backstrom

Cornelis Vreeswijk chronology
I elfte timmen (1986)	Till Fatumeh - Rapport från de osaligas ängder (1987)

Till Fatumeh - Rapport från de osaligas ängder is the last music album recorded by Swedish-Dutch folk singer-songwriter Cornelis Vreeswijk in 1987. Vreeswijk was very sick during recordings and died one month after it was finished. The album was issued shortly after his death.

== Track listing ==
1. "Ann-Katrin farväl"
2. "Hjärterum-stjärterum"
3. "Tiggaren tar sig en rökare"
4. "Bad trip blues"
5. "Den dagen jag blev galen"
6. "En gammal knarkare"
7. "Blues för Fatumeh"
8. "I väntan på en bränsleman"
9. "En sång om gammelfjärden"

== Charts ==
Chart (1987–1988)	Peak position
Swedish Albums (Sverigetopplistan)	11
