= Narrgnistor och transkriptioner =

Studio album by Cornelis Vreeswijk
- Released: 1976
- Genre: Folk music Protest music Swedish folk music
- Length: 40:20
- Label: Universal Records

Cornelis Vreeswijk chronology
Getinghonung (1974)	Narrgnistor och transkriptioner (1976)	Movitz! Movitz! (1977)

Narrgnistor och transkriptioner (English: Foolishnesses and transcriptions) is a studio album by Cornelis Vreeswijk released in 1976.

== Track listing ==
Music and lyrics by Cornelis Vreeswijk unless otherwise noted.

1. "Balladen om båtsman Charlie Donovan"
2. "Herreman Jarl den onde"
3. "Till Bacchus på Bellmans vis"
4. "En inskription"
5. "Visa till polaren Per när han gick in i dimman"
6. "Visa till dig"
7. "Till visans vänner"
8. "Åttio (80) små lökar"
9. "Visa vid Nybroviken"
10. "Marcuses skog"
11. "Transkription för Søren Kierkegaard"
12. "Balladen om Nils Johan Einar Ferlin"

== Charts ==
Chart performance for Narrgnistor och transkriptioner
Chart (1976)	Peak position
Swedish Albums (Sverigetopplistan)	43
