= Fred sjunger Bellman =

Studio album by Fred Åkerström
- Released: 1969
- Genres: Folk music Protest music Swedish folk music
- Label: Metronome
- Producer: Ulf Anderson

Fred Åkerström chronology
Dagsedlar åt kapitalismen (1967)	Fred sjunger Bellman (1969)	Mera Ruben Nilson (1971)

Fred sjunger Bellman (English: Fred sings Bellman) is an album by the Swedish folk singer-songwriter and guitar player Fred Åkerström and contains his interpretations of Carl Michael Bellman. The LP was released in 1969; it was re-released on CD and LP in 1990.

== Track listing ==
Songs and lyrics from Fredmans Epistlar by Carl Michael Bellman:

1. Epistle Nr 3: Fader Berg i hornet stöter
2. Epistle Nr 23: Ack Du Min Moder
3. Epistle Nr 24: Kära Syster, Mig Nu Lyster
4. Epistle Nr 30: Drick Ur Ditt Glas
5. Epistle Nr 34: Ack Vad För En Usel Koja
6. Epistle Nr 35: Bröderna Fara Väl Vilse Ibland
7. Epistle Nr 51: Movitz Blåste en Konsert
8. Epistle Nr 69: Se Dansmästarn
9. Epistle Nr 80: Liksom En Herdinna
10. Epistle Nr 81: Märk Hur Vår Skugga
