= Bush Lady =

Studio album by Monica Törnell
- Released: 1977
- Recorded: at Rockfield Studios, near Monmouth, Wales, from 20 February to 6 March 1977
- Label: Mercury
- Producer: Stephen Franckevich

Monica Törnell chronology
Don't Give a Damn (1975)	Bush Lady (1977)	Jag är som jag är... (1978)

Bush Lady is an album from 1977 by the Swedish singer Monica Törnell. It was Törnells' second English language album and was recorded at Rockfield Studios, near Monmouth, Wales, from 20 February to 6 March 1977. Arrangements and production were by American trumpeter Stephen Franckevich, while it was recorded by technician Ted Sharp. The album has Mercury catalog number 6363-011.

That same year Törnell released the single "Disaster/Snow Cold Day" (Mercury 6062 037). "Disaster" is the same song as track 7 with Törnells' Swedish translation.

== Track listing ==
=== Side one ===
1. "Into the Mystic" (Van Morrison)
2. "Boys and Girls Together" (credited to Jim Peterik on the cover; however, it is thought that Bill Chase of the band "Chase", originally wrote it)
3. "Drop Dead" (Monica Törnell)
4. "Bush Lady" (Stephen Franckevich)
5. "Rock'n Roll Widow" (Tom Snow)
6. "Outer Interlude" (Stephen Franckevich)
7. "Catastrophie" (music: Monica Törnell, Lyrics: Stephen Franckevich)

=== Side two ===
1. "Is not No Disco" (music: Ulf - Stephen Franckevich, Lyrics: Stephen Franckevich)
2. "Snow Cold Day" (music: Stephen Franckevich, text: Anthony Bannon)
3. "Ego" (music: Lars Hallberg - Monica Törnell, text: Monica Törnell)
4. "Say Yes" (Stephen Franckevich)
5. "Not Necessarily" (music: Monica Törnell - Stephen Franckevich, text: Monica Törnell)

== Personnel ==
- Lars Ekholm: Acoustic and Electric Guitars
- Stephen Franckevich, vocals, percussion, hand folding, trumpets, flugelhorn
- Leif Fredriksson, drums, percussion, vocal backing, hand folding
- Carl Axel Hall: Keyboards & Percussion
- Lars Hallberg: Bass on tracks 3 & 7
- David Winter: Bass on all other tracks
