= I elfte timmen =

Studio album by Cornelis Vreeswijk
- Released: 1986
- Genre: Folk music Protest music Swedish folk music
- Label: Slager

Cornelis Vreeswijk chronology
| Mannen som älskade träd (1985) | I elfte timmen (1986) | Till Fatumeh - Repport från de osaligas ängder (1987) |

I elfte timmen, (English: At eleventh hour) is a music album recorded by Swedish-Dutch folk singer-songwriter Cornelis Vreeswijk in 1986. The album contains a selection of Vreeswijk's older songs, recorded in new, modern versions in an effort to attract a younger audience to the artist.

== Track listing ==
1. "Somliga går i trasiga skor"
2. "Ångbåtsblus"
3. "Telegram från en bombad by"
4. "Tjena assistenten"
5. "Balladen om Herr Fredrik Åkare och den söta Fröken Cecilia Lind
6. "Fåglar"
7. "Jag hade en gång en båt"
8. "Skyddsrumsboogie"
9. "Rörande vindriktning"
10. "Salig Lasse liten"
11. "Dikt till en gammal dambekant"
12. "Felicia adjö"

== Personnel ==
- Cornelis Vreeswijk - vocal, guitar
- Per Alm - guitar
- Håkan Lundqvist, Jörgen Bornemark - keyboard.
- Lasse Risberg - bass.
- Peter Fältskog - drums

== Charts ==
| Chart (1987) | Peak position |
|---|---|
| Swedish Albums (Sverigetopplistan) | 19 |
