= Nå skruva Fiolen =

1790 epistle by Carl Michael Bellman

- Art song
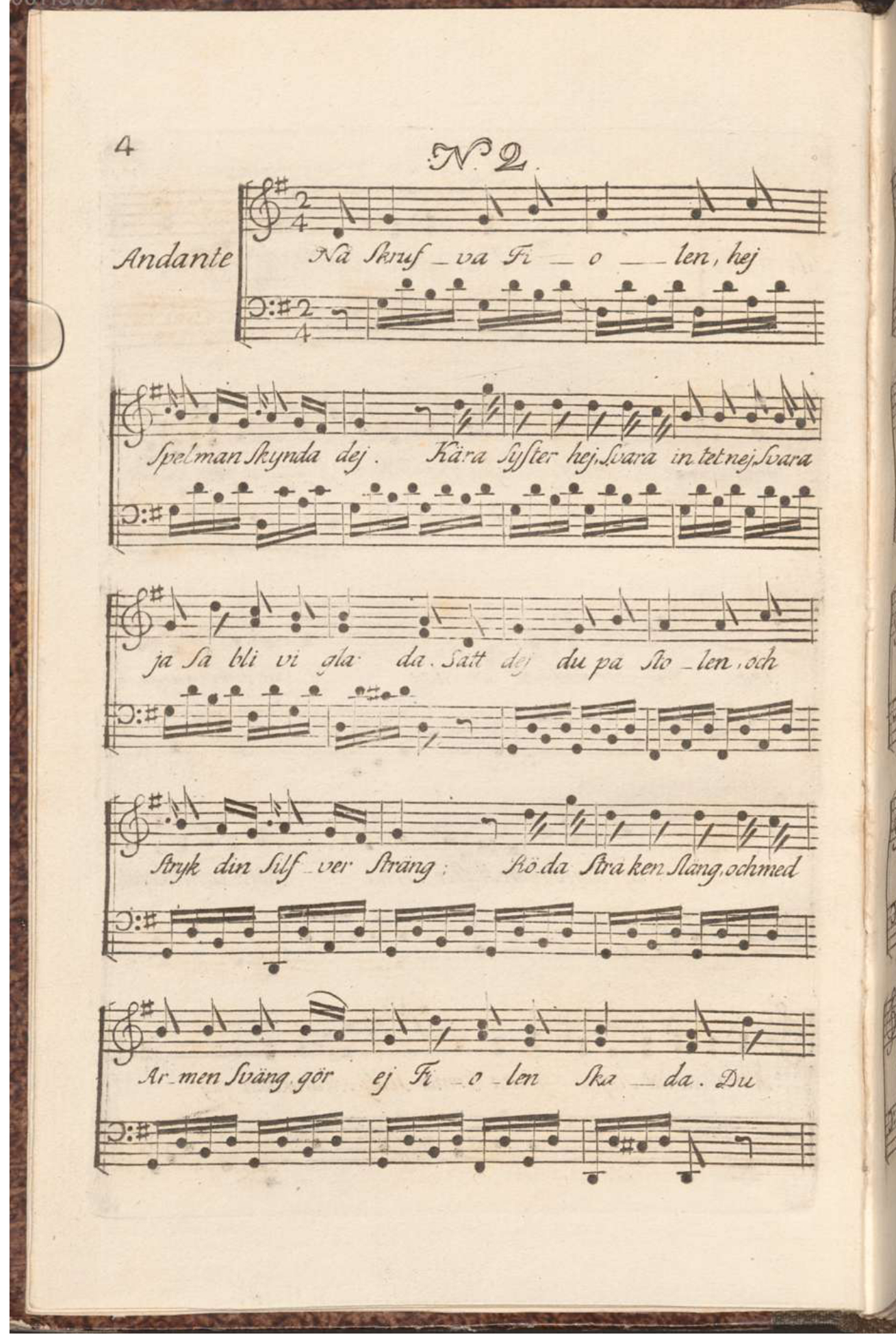
- First page of sheet music for the 1810 edition
- English: Now screw the violin
- Written: July–September 1770
- Text: poem by Carl Michael Bellman
- Language: Swedish
- Melody: Unknown origin
- Dedication: Fader Berg
- Published: 1790 in Fredman's Epistles
- Scoring: voice and cittern

Nå skruva fiolen (Now screw the violin) is Epistle No. 2 in the Swedish poet and performer Carl Michael Bellman's 1790 song collection, Fredman's Epistles. The epistle is subtitled "Till fader Berg, rörande fiolen" (To father Berg, about the violin). It is both about and mimicking the rhythm of playing the violin. The scholar Lars Lönnroth comments that Bellman used the resemblance of a cello to a woman's body, certainly pretending to play it as such for laughs, while the use of words like "screw" in the lyrics was similarly explicitly obscene. The Bellman interpreter Fred Åkerström recorded the song on his 1974 album Glimmande nymf.

== Background ==
Carl Michael Bellman is a central figure in the Swedish ballad tradition and a powerful influence in Swedish music, known for his 1790 Fredman's Epistles and his 1791 Fredman's Songs. A solo entertainer, he played the cittern, accompanying himself as he performed his songs at the royal court.

Jean Fredman (1712 or 1713–1767) was a real watchmaker of Bellman's Stockholm. The fictional Fredman, alive after 1767, but without employment, is the supposed narrator in Bellman's epistles and songs. The epistles, written and performed in different styles, from drinking songs and laments to pastorales, paint a complex picture of the life of the city during the 18th century. A frequent theme is the demimonde, with Fredman's cheerfully drunk Order of Bacchus, a loose company of ragged men who favour strong drink and prostitutes. At the same time as depicting this realist side of life, Bellman creates a rococo picture, full of classical allusion, following the French post-Baroque poets. The women, including the beautiful Ulla Winblad, are "nymphs", while Neptune's festive troop of followers and sea-creatures sport in Stockholm's waters. The juxtaposition of elegant and low life is humorous, sometimes burlesque, but always graceful and sympathetic. The songs are "most ingeniously" set to their music, which is nearly always borrowed and skilfully adapted.

== Epistle ==
=== Music and verse form ===
Melody of Epistle 2
Melody as adapted by Bellman from an unknown source

The song has three stanzas, each of 17 lines, with a cello interlude before the 15th line. It is in 2/4 time, marked Andante. The rhyming pattern is ABBBC-ADDDC-ECEC-FFC.

The source of the melody is unknown, but a variant is printed in Bellmans Poetiska Arbeten with the timbre Marche. The musicologist James Massengale comments that the melody printed there does not fit the rhythm of the text on the third and fourth lines, so it may be closer to the source than Bellman's adaptation of the tune.

=== Lyrics ===
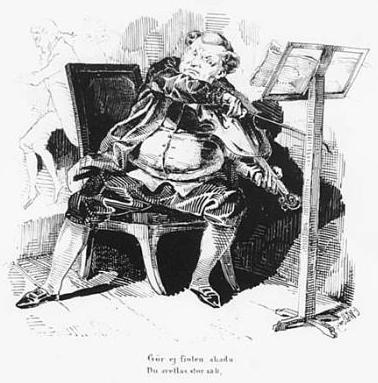
Engraving "Gör ej fiolen skada. Du svettas, stor sak..." (Note: Lines from the first stanza: "Don't damage the violin. You're sweating. No great matter...") Fredman's Epistle 2, by Carl Wahlbom, before 1858

The song was written between July and September 1770, making it one of the early epistles. The composition is subtitled "Till fader Berg, rörande fiolen" (To father Berg, about the violin). The lyrics portray and mimic the rhythm of playing the violin. Bellman's biographer Paul Britten Austin notes that where epistle No. 3 ("Fader Berg i hornet stöter") perfectly captures the sound of a horn with its minuet melody, No. 2's melody "is exactly a fiddler's", as "no hornist could conveniently play this tune". He remarks how different the two are "in style, tempo, rhythm, even instrumental tone-colour". Epistle No. 2 uses "swift flitting words" like "Kära Syster, hej!" to suggest the bowing of the violin, while the song begins with the "Vivaldi-like upbeat" of "Nå!", in his view placing the listener instantly on the dance-floor.

Starting lines of Epistle No. 2
Carl Michael Bellman, 1770

Nå skrufva Fiolen,
Hej! Spelman skynda dej.
Kära Syster, hej!
Svara inte nej,
Svara Ja så bli Vi glada.
Sätt dej du på stolen,
Och stryk din Silfversträng; (Note: The lowest string on contemporary violins was wound with silver wire.)

Paul Britten Austin, 1977

So screw up the fiddle,
Come fiddler, quick, I say!
Dearest sister, hey!
Never say me nay,
Say but yes and we'll be jolly.
Sit down, man, don't dawdle,
caress thy silver string;

== Reception and legacy ==
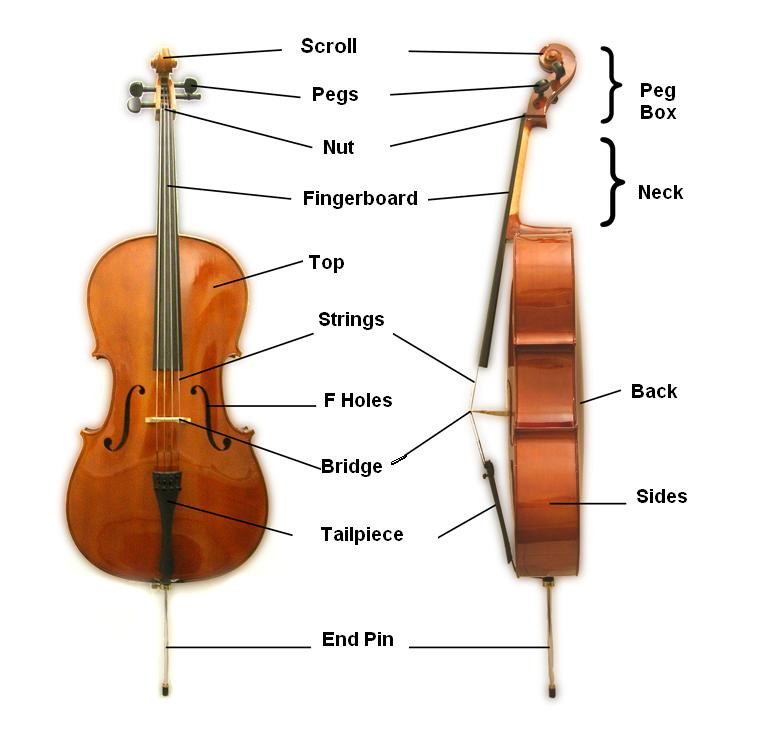
The parts of a cello

Lars Lönnroth writes that Bellman had the cello play the role of Ulla Winblad's body; contemporary instruments, and indeed his own cittern, were topped by a small carved head of a woman, above the tuning pegs. On the intervention of the cello in each stanza, marked "V:cllo" in the text, he states that Bellman certainly pretended to play the instrument, lewdly gliding his hands up and down its body and making everyone laugh. He puns on "skruva" ("screw", a tuning peg in the head of a stringed instrument, and the verb for "to screw") also in Epistle 7, Fram med basfiolen, knäpp och skruva, "Som synes vara en elegi, skriven vid Ulla Winblad's säng, sent om en afton" (Which seems to be an elegy, written by Ulla Winblad's bed, late one evening). Its opening lines are "Fram med basfiolen, knäpp och skruva, V:cllo --- skjut skruven in; pip och kuttra som en turturduva V:cllo --- för makan sin" (Out with the bass viol, pluck and screw, Cello --- push the screw in; twitter and coo like a turtle dove Cello --- for his wife). Lönnroth comments that the ambiguity about the instrument here turns to explicit obscenity.

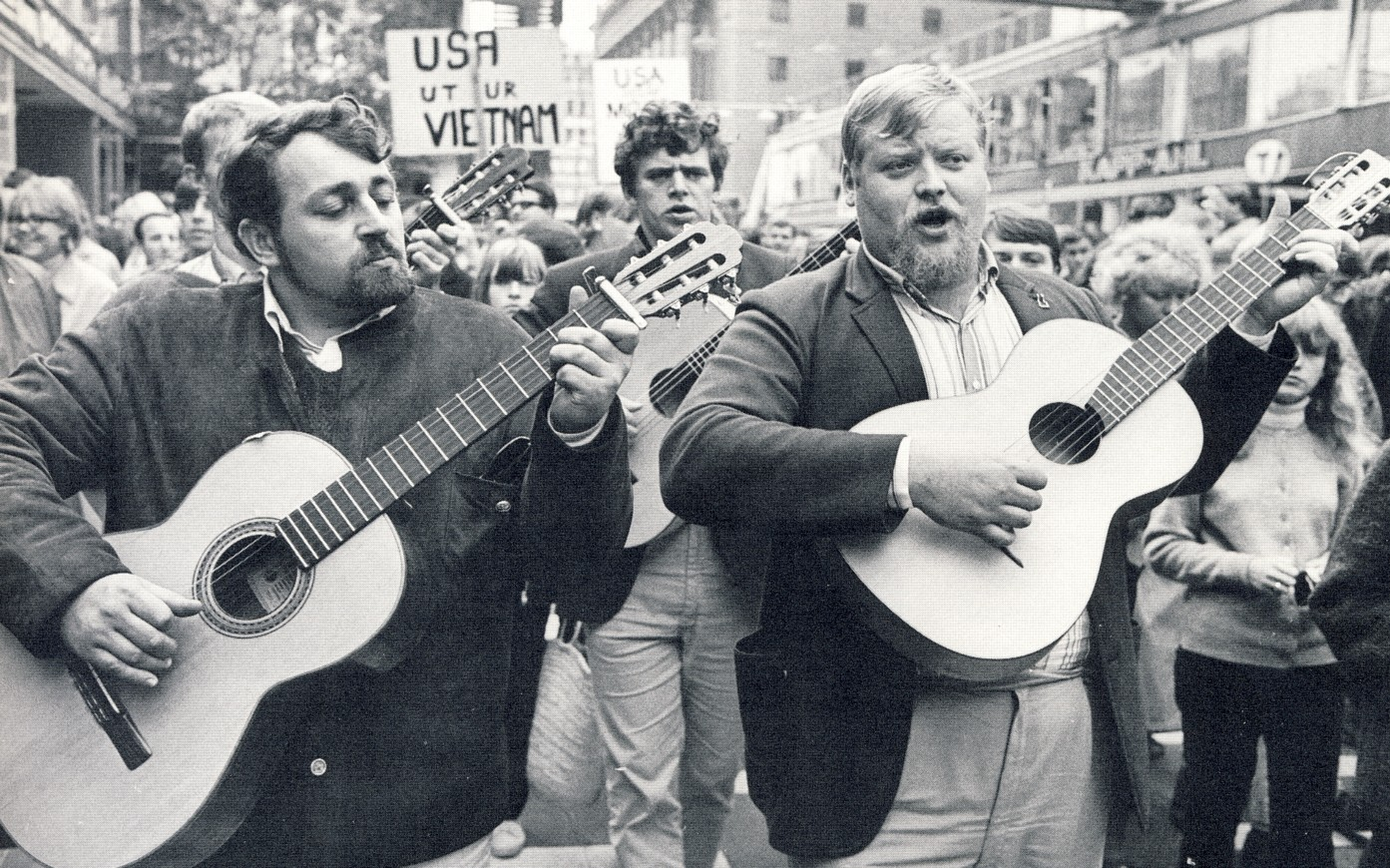
Cornelis Vreeswijk (left) and Fred Åkerström (centre) in Stockholm's Hötorget, 1965

The Epistle was recorded live in Stockholm's concert hall by Cornelis Vreeswijk, Fred Åkerström and Ann-Louise Hanson as the first track of their 1964 folk music album Visor och oförskämdheter. Åkerström also recorded the song on his 1974 studio album Glimmande Nymf, where it formed the first track. His guitar and vocals were accompanied in his group's arrangement by Katarina Fritzén on flute and vocals, and Örjan Larsson on cello; the recording omits the last stanza. It was recorded, too, by Bosse Forssell on his 1999 album Porträtt av Bellman. The Epistle is sung in English by the tenor Torsten Mossberg, accompanied by Jonas Isaksson on guitar and Andreas Nyberg on violin, on the 2020 classical album Är jag född så vill jag leva/Am I Born, Then I'll Be Living.

== Sources ==
- Bellman, Carl Michael (1790). Fredmans epistlar. Stockholm: By Royal Privilege.
- Britten Austin, Paul (1967). The Life and Songs of Carl Michael Bellman: Genius of the Swedish Rococo. New York: Allhem, Malmö American-Scandinavian Foundation. ISBN 978-3-932759-00-0.
- Britten Austin, Paul (1977). Fredman's Epistles and Songs: A Selection in English. Stockholm: Reuter & Reuter. OCLC 186784336.
- Hassler, Göran; Dahl, Peter (illus.) (1989). Bellman – en antologi [Bellman – an anthology]. En bok för alla. ISBN 91-7448-742-6. (contains the most popular Epistles and Songs, in Swedish, with sheet music)
- Kleveland, Åse; Ehrén, Svenolov (illus.) (1984). Fredmans epistlar & sånger [The songs and epistles of Fredman]. Stockholm: Informationsförlaget. ISBN 91-7736-059-1. (with facsimiles of sheet music from first editions in 1790, 1791)
- Lönnroth, Lars (2005). Ljuva karneval! : om Carl Michael Bellmans diktning [Lovely Carnival! : about Carl Michael Bellman's Verse]. Stockholm: Bonniers. ISBN 978-91-0-057245-7. OCLC 61881374.
- Massengale, James Rhea (1979). The Musical-Poetic Method of Carl Michael Bellman. Stockholm: Almqvist & Wiksell International. ISBN 91-554-0849-4.
