= Cornelis sjunger Victor Jara =

Studio album by Cornelis Vreeswijk
- Released: 1978
- Recorded: December 1977
- Genres: Folks protest
- Length: 37:48
- Labels: Metronome Records; WEA; WM Sweden
- Producer: Anders Burman

Cornelis Vreeswijk chronology
Movitz! Movitz! (1977)	Cornelis sjunger Victor Jara (1978)	Narrgnistor 2, En halv böj blues och andra ballader (1978)

Cornelis sjunger Victor Jara: rätten till ett eget liv (English: Cornelis sings Victor Jara: The right to one's own life) is an album released by Swedish-Dutch folk singer-songwriter Cornelis Vreeswijk in 1978.

== History ==
Vreeswijk worked and travelled to Latin America in the late 1960s and early 1970s and developed a great appreciation for its rich musical heritage. He translated ten songs of Chilean troubadour Victor Jara and recorded both a Swedish and a Dutch album with translated songs.

== Track listing ==
1. "Plogen" (El arado) The plough (Victor Jara - Adapt: Cornelis Vreeswijk) 3:35
2. "Jag minns dig Amanda" (Te recuerdo Amanda) I remember you Amanda (Victor Jara - Adapt: Cornelis Vreeswijk) - 2:25
3. "A Cuba" To Cuba (Victor Jara - Adapt: Cornelis Vreeswijk) - 4:20
4. "Manifest" (Manifesto) (Victor Jara - Adapt: Cornelis Vreeswijk) - 4:00
5. "Rätten till ett eget liv" (El derecho de vivir en paz) The right to live in peace (Victor Jara - Adapt: Cornelis Vreeswijk) - 4:05
6. "La Diuca" (Victor Jara - Adapt: Cornelis Vreeswijk) - 2:58
7. "Varken det ena eller andra" (Ni chicha, ni limona) Nor fish, nor fowl (Victor Jara - Adapt: Cornelis Vreeswijk) - 3:23
8. "Angelita Hueneman" (Victor Jara - Adapt: Cornelis Vreeswijk) - 4:08
9. "Fimpen" (El cigarrito) The cigarette butt (Victor Jara - Adapt: Cornelis Vreeswijk) - 2:16
10. "Folkets vind" (Vientos del pueblo) Winds of the people (Victor Jara - Miguel Hernandez - Adapt: Cornelis Vreeswijk) - 2:35
11. "La Partida - Instrumental" The departure (Victor Jara - Adapt: Cornelis Vreeswijk) - 3:15

== Personnel ==
- Cornelis Vreeswijk - vocal
- Björn J:son Lindh - flute, piano, electric piano, keyboards
- Janne Schaffer - guitar

=== Other musicians ===
- Lasse Englund - guitar
- Mats Glenngård - violin, viola
- Sture Nordin - bass
- Stefan Brolund - bass ("Plogen")
- Okay Temiz - percussion
- Hassan Bah - congas ("A Cuba")

== Charts ==
Chart performance for Cornelis sjunger Victor Jara
Chart (1978)	Peak position
Swedish Albums (Sverigetopplistan)	12
