= Åkerströms blandning =

Studio album by Fred Åkerström
- Released: 1982
- Recorded: 1981–1982
- Studio: Metronome Studio
- Genre: Folk music Protest music Swedish folk music
- Label: Metronome

Fred Åkerström chronology
Sjöfolk och landkrabbor (1978)	Åkerströms blandning (1982)

Åkerströms blandning (English: Åkerström's mix) is the last studio album by Swedish folk singer-songwriter and guitar player Fred Åkerström.

== Track listing ==
1. "Artisten"
2. "En liten konstnär"
3. "Kajsas udde"
4. "När du går"
5. "Möte med musik"
6. "Far har fortalt"
7. "Liten gosse"
8. "Fragancia"
9. "Visa till Katarina"
10. "Margareta"
11. "Sann berättelse ur livet"
12. "Vän av ordning"
13. "Ett liv efter detta"
