= Poem, ballader och lite blues =

Studio album by Cornelis Vreeswijk
- Released: 1970
- Genre: Folk music Protest music Swedish folk music
- Label: Metronome
- Producer: Anders Burman

Cornelis Vreeswijk chronology
Cornelis sjunger Taube (1969)	Poem, ballader och lite blues (1970)	Spring mot Ulla, spring! Cornelis sjunger Bellman (1971)

Poem, ballader och lite blues (English: Poems, ballads and a little blues) is the sixth studio album by Swedish-Dutch folk singer-songwriter Cornelis Vreeswijk. All songs from the album were newly recorded in 2007 by other artists, as a homage to Vreeswijk.

== Track listing ==
All songs by Cornelis Vreeswijk, unless otherwise noted.

1. "Rosenblad, rosenblad" (Cornelis Vreeswijk/Georg Riedel)
2. Generalens visa
3. "Apollinaire"
4. "Fåglar" (Cornelis Vreeswijk/Björn Lindh)
5. "Jag" (Cornelis Vreeswijk/Björn Lindh)
6. Hajar'u de då Jack?
7. "Morbror Frans"
8. Huvudlösen för aftonen
9. "Etta"
10. Fredmans Epistel no. 81 (Carl Michael Bellman
11. "Blues för Inga-Maj"
12. "Ett brev"
13. Cool water - på Den Gyldene Freden (Cornelis Vreeswijk/Björn Lindh)
14. "Ett gammalt bergtroll" (Waldenius, Borgudd, Häggström/Gustaf Fröding
15. Sonja och Siw (Cornelis Vreeswijk/Georg Wadenius)
16. "Predikan" (Cornelis Vreeswijk/Björn Lindh)
17. Elisabeth
18. "Hemställan"
19. En visa till gagga (Cornelis Vreeswijk/Björn Lindh)
20. "Ågren" (Alf Cranner, Harald Sverdrup, Cornelis Vreeswijk)
21. "Hopplös blues"
22. "Skulle iagh söria såå wore iagh tokott"
23. "Transkription till d'Artagnan"
24. "Anna själv tredje"
25. "En viss sorts samba" (Cornelis Vreeswijk/Georg Riedel)

== Personnel ==
- Cornelis Vreeswijk - vocal, guitar
- Rune Gustafsson - guitar
- Björn J:son Lindh - piano, harpsichord, flute
- Georg Wadenius - guitar, bass
- Tommy Borgudd - drums
- Sten Bergman - keyboards
- Palle Danielsson - bass
- Rune Carlsson - drums
