= Visor och oförskämdheter =

Live album by Cornelis Vreeswijk, Fred Åkerström and Ann-Louise Hanson
- Released: 1964
- Recorded: December 1964
- Genre: Folk music Protest music Swedish folk music
- Length: 38:28
- Label: Metronome
- Producer: Anders Burman

Cornelis Vreeswijk chronology
Ballader och oförskämdheter (1964)	Visor och oförskämdheter (1964)	Ballader och grimascher (1965)

Fred Åkerström chronology
Fred besjunger Frida (1964)	Visor och oförskämdheter (1964)	Visor i närheten (1965)

Visor och oförskämdheter (English: Songs and impertinencies) is a live album, featuring Swedish folk musicians Cornelis Vreeswijk, Fred Åkerström and Ann-Louise Hanson. It was recorded live in Stockholm's Concert hall in December 1964. Prior to this album, Vreeswijk was forced to decide whether or not to continue his studies or pursue music. He decided to stop studying and embarked on a tour with Fred Åkerström and Ann-Louise Hanson, during which this album was recorded.

== Track listing ==
1. Fredman's Epistel No. 2 – "Nå skruva fiolen" - 1:44
2. "Duett i Småland" - 2:16
3. "Teddybjörnen" - 1:20
4. "Man borde inte sova" - 3:09
5. "I Spaniens månsken" - 2:40
6. "Fröken Saga / Visan om bomben" - 4:29
7. "I natt jag drömde något som" - 2:03
8. "Vidalita" - 3:33
9. "Brev från kolonien" - 3:06
10. "De stora eventyre" - 2:01
11. "Elin och herremannen" - 3:50
12. "Milan" - 0:37
13. "Morgon efter regn" - 2:23
14. "Mördar-Anders" - 2:07
15. "Rallarvisa" - 2:34

== Personnel ==
- Cornelis Vreeswijk – vocal, acoustic guitar
- Fred Åkerström – vocal, acoustic guitar
- Ann-Louise Hanson – vocal
- Nils Hellmark – guitar
