= Mannen som älskade träd =

Studio album by Cornelis Vreeswijk
- Released: 1985
- Studio: Aurora Lydstudio
- Genre: Folk music Protest music Swedish folk music
- Label: Slager
- Producer: Jan Ero Olsen, Alexander Stojanovic

Cornelis Vreeswijk chronology
Homager och Pamfletter (1981)	Mannen som älskade träd (1985)	I elfte timmen (1986)

Mannen som älskade träd (English: The Man, who loved trees) is a music album recorded by Swedish-Dutch folk singer-songwriter Cornelis Vreeswijk in 1985. It was recorded in Tromsø, Norway, four years after his previous album.

== Track listing ==
1. "Mannen som älskade träd no. 1"
2. "Mannen som älskade träd no. 2"
3. "Babyland"
4. "Skyddsrumsboogie"
5. "En dag var hela jorden"
6. "Goddag yxskaft-blues"
7. "I väntan på Pierrot"
8. "Blues för Dubrovnik"
9. "Från mitt delfinarium"
10. "50-öres-blues"
11. "På en näverdosa"
12. "Sång om coyote och varför han bara sjunger om natten"
13. "En resa"
