= Två tungor =

Studio album by Fred Åkerström
- Released: 1972
- Genre: Folk music Protest music Swedish folk music
- Label: WM Sweden

Fred Åkerström chronology
Mera Ruben Nilson (1971)	Två tungor (1972)	Glimmande nymf (1974)

Två tungor (English: Two tongues) is an album by the Swedish folk singer-songwriter and guitar player Fred Åkerström.

The title song is a Swedish version of a poem by Norwegian Inger Hagerup, while Jag Ger Dig Min Morgon (English: I give you the morning) is a translation of a song by Tom Paxton from the 1969 LP The Things I Notice Now.

== Track listing ==
1. Jag Ger Dig Min Morgon (Paxton, Åkerström) 3:47
2. Berceuse (Paxton, Åkerström) 2:54
3. Oslo (Åkerström) 2:33
4. Två Tungor (Hagerup, Kalvik, Åkerström) 1:59
5. Sannah (Åkerström) 2:53
6. Natt I En Stad (Nilsen, Åkerström) 2:49
7. Den Gamle Skärsliparen (Andersen, Åkerström, Pedersen) 5:41
8. Spritarnas Tango (Åkerström) 0:44
9. Vissångarvisa (Åkerström) 3:25
10. Visa Till Ombudsmän (Andersson, Åkerström) 4:14
11. Till Gruvtolvan (Åkerström) 1:02
12. Den Trettionde I Första Sjuttitvå (Åkerström) 3:55
