= Sjöfolk och landkrabbor =

Studio album by Fred Åkerström
- Released: 1978
- Genre: Folk music Protest music Swedish folk music
- Label: Metronome Records
- Producer: Anders Burman

Fred Åkerström chronology
Vila vid denna källa (1977)	Sjöfolk och landkrabbor (1978)	Åkerströms blandning (1982)

Sjöfolk och landkrabbor (English: Sea people and land crabs) is an album by the Swedish folk singer-songwriter and guitar player Fred Åkerström. He sings Nordic songs in arrangements of Anders Ekdahl.

== Track listing ==
1. Båklandets Vackra Maja 2:58
2. Nödhamn 3:05
3. Katinka, Katinka 3:01
4. Sjömanskistan 4:02
5. Han Hade Seglat För Om Masten 2:29
6. Den Sorte Seiler 3:50
7. Stängd Teater 3:58
8. Sören Bramfris Laerkesang 3:14
9. Luffarevisa 3:30
10. Storbynatt 3:53
11. Nordsjön 6:35
