= Bananer – bland annat =

Bananer - bland annat

Studio album by Cornelis Vreeswijk
- Released: 1980
- Genre: Folk music Protest music Swedish folk music
- Label: A Disc

Cornelis Vreeswijk chronology
En spjutkastares visor (1980)	Bananer - bland annat (1980)	Cornelis sjunger Povel (1981)

Bananer – bland annat (English: Bananas - among other) is a music album recorded by the Swedish-Dutch folk singer-songwriter Cornelis Vreeswijk in 1980.

== Track listing ==
Music and lyrics by Cornelis Vreeswijk unless otherwise noted

1. "The Bananrepublikens sång" – 2:28
2. "Samba för Pomperipossa" – 2:50
3. "Systemblues" – 3:43
4. "När det brinner i Lögnfabriken" – 2:48
5. "Syndomblues" – 3:06
6. "Blues för IRA" – 2:35
7. "Sist jag åkte jumbojet blues" – 3:22
8. "Blues för Victor Jara" – 2:45
9. "Blues för Almqvist" – 1:25
10. "Blues för en arbetarekvinna som hängt sig" – 2:47
11. "Blues för Fatumeh" – 2:38
12. "Bruna bönor complet" – 3:09
13. "Blues för Macbeth" – 2:22
14. "En resa" – 2:20

== Personnel ==
- Cornelis Vreeswijk - vocal, guitar
- Conny Söderlund - guitar, vocal, rhythm instruments
- Owe Gustavsson - bass
