= Fred besjunger Frida =

Album by Fred Åkerström

Studio album by Fred Åkerström
- Released: 1964
- Genre: Folk music Protest music Swedish folk music
- Label: Metronome

Fred Åkerström chronology
Fred Åkerström sjunger Ruben Nilson' (1963)	Fred besjunger Frida (1964)	Visor och oförskämdheter (1964)

Fred Åkerström besjunger Frida (English: Fred Åkerström re-sings Frida) is an album by the Swedish folk singer-songwriter and guitar player Fred Åkerström. On this album, Åkerström interprets songs of the Swedish folk author, Birger Sjöberg

== Track listing ==
1. Söndagsmorgon
2. Frida sörjer sommaren
3. Basens sorg
4. Bleka dödens minut
5. Aftontankar vid Fridas ruta
6. Duvdrottningen
7. Romantisk promenad
8. Hos min doktor
9. Månens hy
10. Finge Frida rätt
11. Krigssyn
