= Blondie (2012 film) =

2012 film directed by Jesper Ganslandt

- Movie poster
- Directed by: Jesper Ganslandt.
- Starring: Marie Göranzon, Alexandra Dahlström, Helena af Sandeberg, Olle Sarri and Carolina Gynning
- Release date: 2012
- Country: Sweden
- Language: Swedish

Blondie is a Swedish film from 2012 directed by Jesper Ganslandt. The main roles of the film are played by Marie Göranzon, Alexandra Dahlström, Helena af Sandeberg, Olle Sarri and Carolina Gynning. The film had its world premiere at the 69th Venice International Film Festival in 2012.
