= Vintersaga =

Song by Ted Ström

from the album Ge mig mer
- Language: Swedish
- Released: 1984
- Genre: pop
- Songwriter: Ted Ström

Vintersaga is a 1984 song written by Ted Ström, recorded by himself. The song has also been recorded by Monica Törnell, Jerry Williams, and Andreas Johnson.

The lyrics mentions how different places, people and ways of communication around Sweden handle a nationwide snowstorm, from Mommas krog in Kiruna in the northern parts to farms in Österlen in the south. Several other Ted Ström songs deal mainly with geographical names, transport and weather-related events.

== Recordings ==
The song was recorded for his album Ge mig mer (1984) and has also been recorded by Monica Törnell (1984), Jerry Williams (1990) and Loa Falkman (2002) In 2007, the song was recorded by Jenny Wahlgren (born 1965) from Fjärdhundra. The Jerry Williams version charted at Svensktoppen for 12 weeks between 30 September-16 December 1990, peaking at second position.

In 1998, Ted Ström recorded a new version of the song, with changed lyrics, recorded for the album regi: Lars Molin, musik: Ted Ström (1999). In 2006 he recorded another version, for the album Vinterhamn.

In 2007 it was recorded by Mathias Holmgren on the album Lejonhjärta.

In 2013 Andreas Johnson reached the final of Alla tiders hits with his own version of the song.

In 2015 Amanda Bergman did a cover version together with Oskar Linnros in an ad campaign for Volvo Cars.
