= Movitz! Movitz! =

Studio album by Cornelis Vreeswijk
- Released: 1977
- Genre: Folk music Protest music Swedish folk music
- Length: 36:14
- Label: Universal Records

Cornelis Vreeswijk chronology
Narrgnistor och transkriptioner (1976)	Movitz! Movitz! (1977)	Cornelis sjunger Victor Jara (1978)

Movitz! Movitz! is a 1977 album by Cornelis Vreeswijk of his interpretations of the Stockholm troubadour, Carl Michael Bellman.

== Track list ==
Songs and lyrics from Fredman's Epistles and Fredman's Songs by Carl Michael Bellman.

1. Epistel no. 52 – Movitz, mitt hjärta blöder! – 3:16
2. Epistel no. 56 – Nota bene – 1:12
3. Epistel no. 65 – Movitz med flor om armen – 4:55
4. Epistel no. 28 – Tre remmare – 2:55
5. Epistel no. 2 – Nå, skruva fiolen – 2:18
6. Epistel no. 81 – Märk hur vår skugga – 4:37
7. Epistel no. 80 – Liksom en herdinna – 3:38
8. Epistel no. 35 – Bröderna fara väl vilse ibland – 3:03
9. Epistel no. 17 – Bacchi kalender – 0:50
10. Song no. 18 – Frossan – 2:43
11. Epistel no. 34 – Ack, för en usel koja! – 2:55
12. Epistel no. 30 – Drick ur ditt glas – 6:32

== Personnel ==
- Cornelis Vreeswijk – vocals
- Ulf G. Åhslund – acoustic guitar, arrangements
