= Fred Åkerström sjunger Ruben Nilson =

Studio album by Fred Åkerström
- Released: 1963
- Genre: Folk music Protest music Swedish folk music
- Label: Metronome

Fred Åkerström chronology
Fred Åkerström sjunger Ruben Nilson (1963)	Fred besjunger Frida (1964)

Fred Åkerström sjunger Ruben Nilson (English: Fred Åkerström sings Ruben Nilson) is a debut studio album by Swedish folk singer-songwriter and guitar player Fred Åkerström. On the album, Åkerström interprets songs of Swedish folk author Ruben Nilson.

== Track listing ==
1. Trubaduren (03:01)
2. Duett i Småland (02:41)
3. Åkare Lundgrens begravning (03:39)
4. Förstadsromantik (03:15)
5. Ficktjyvens visa (02:57)
6. Fimpen och tändstickan (03:08)
7. Bergsprängardramatik (03:32)
8. Den odödliga hästen (03:13)
9. Amerikabrevet (02:14)
10. Laban och hans döttrar (02:35)
