= Glimmande nymf (album) =

Studio album by Fred Åkerström
- Released: 1974
- Genre: Folk music Protest music Swedish folk music
- Label: Warner Sweden

Fred Åkerström chronology
Två tungor (1972)	Glimmande nymf (1974)	Bananskiva (1976)

Glimmande nymf (English: Glimmering Nymph) is a 1974 album by the Swedish folk singer-songwriter and guitar player Fred Åkerström and his "CMB Trio", with more of his acclaimed interpretations of Carl Michael Bellman's Fredman's Epistles and Fredman's Songs. It is named for Fredman's Epistle No. 72, Glimmande nymf.

== Track listing ==
Songs and lyrics by Carl Michael Bellman.

1. Epistle no. 2: Nå Skruva Fiolen 2:23
2. Epistle no. 23: Ack Du Min Moder 8:06
3. Epistle no. 41: Mollberg Satt I Paulun 4:40
4. Epistle no. 12: Gråt Fader Berg 4:17
5. Epistle no. 72: Glimmande Nymf 6:35
6. Epistle no. 63: Fader Bergström 2:36
7. Epistle no. 35: Bröderna Fara Väl Vilse Ibland 7:25
8. Song no. 21: Så Lunka Vi Så Småningom 4:23

== Personnel ==
- Fred Åkerström – guitar, vocals
- Örjan Larsson – cello
- Katarina Fritzén – flute
