= Jack Vreeswijk =

Musical artist

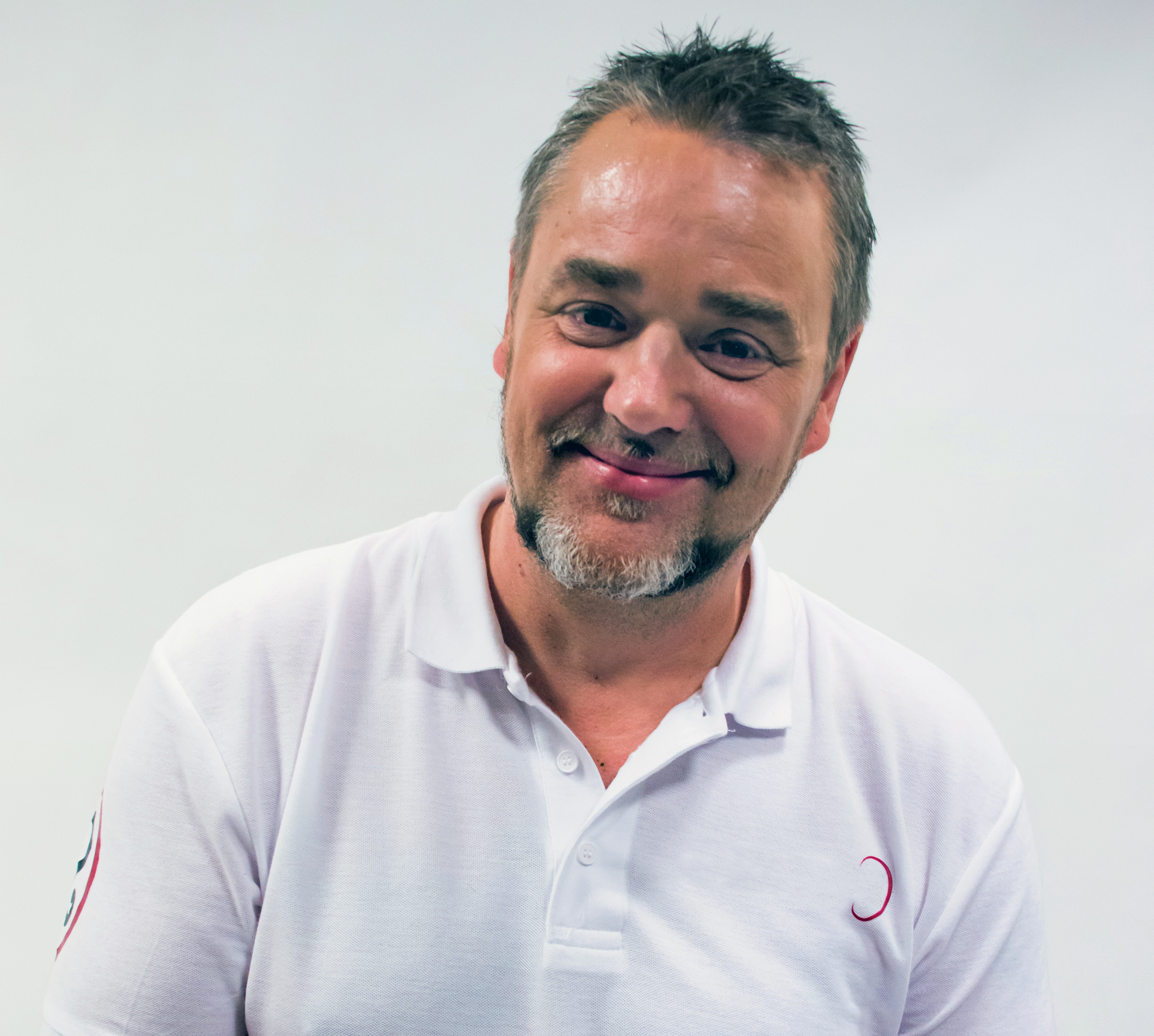
- Vreeswijk in 2015

Background information
- Born: Lars Jacob Jack Vreeswijk; 25 January 1964; Stockholm, Sweden
- Died: 3 April 2023 (aged 59) Uddevalla, Sweden
- Genres: Folk music
- Occupations: Singer, songwriter

Lars Jacob Jack Vreeswijk (25 January 1964 – 3 April 2023) was a Swedish ballad singer, song lyricist and composer. The son of troubadour Cornelis Vreeswijk, he followed in his father's footsteps and released three albums of his own, often singing his father's songs. He was usually accompanied by guitarist Love Tholin.

In summer 2006, Jack Vreeswijk appeared in a biographical musical show about his father Från James Dean till Nationalskald (meaning From James Dean to National Bard), on Lundsbrunns Health Resort in Götene. The screenplay was written by him and he also played the lead role as the older Cornelis. The acting was interspersed with songs.

Vreeswijk composed music for a film about Cornelis Vreeswijk's life, and produced eight of the tracks on Hans-Erik Dyvik Husbys' album I ljuset av Cornelis (meaning In light of Cornelis). In 2009, he released a tribute album to his father's music titled Jack Vreeswijk sjunger Vreeswijk.

== Personal life and death ==
Jack Vreeswijk lived in Uddevalla with his wife and two sons, Calle and Olle. In 2000, he received the Cornelis Vreeswijk scholarship and in 2008, the Fred Åkerström scholarship.

Vreeswijk died from colorectal cancer on 3 April 2023, at the age of 59.

== Discography ==
=== Albums ===
Year	Album	Chart peak (SWE)	Certification
1996	Is i magen	39	
2004	Underbart	–	
2009	Jack Vreeswijk sjunger Vreeswijk	29	
2012	Wichita	15	

== Filmography ==
- 2010: Cornelis (composer)
