= Spring mot Ulla, spring! Cornelis sjunger Bellman =

Studio album by Cornelis Vreeswijk
- Released: 1971
- Genre: Folk music Protest music Swedish folk music
- Label: Philips Records

Cornelis Vreeswijk chronology
Poem, ballader och lite blues (1970)	Spring mot Ulla, spring! Cornelis sjunger Bellman (1971)	Visor, svarta och röda (1972)

Spring mot Ulla, spring! Cornelis sjunger Bellman (English: Run to Ulla, run! Cornelis sings Bellman) is a 1971 studio album by the Swedish-Dutch folk singer-songwriter Cornelis Vreeswijk. The album contains an unconventional presentation of Carl Michael Bellman songs from his 1790 Fredman's Epistles, and was a commercial success for Vreeswijk. The title phrase "Spring mot Ulla, spring!" is a line in Epistle 67, "Fader Movitz, Bror", which is the first track in the album.

== Track listing ==
All songs by Carl Michael Bellman.

1. Epistel no. 67 - Fader Movitz, Bror
2. Epistel no. 43 - Värm mer öl och bröd
3. Epistel no. 40 - Ge rum i bröllopsgåln
4. Epistel no. 36 - Vår Ulla låg i sängen och sov
5. Epistel no. 72 - Glimmande nymf
6. Epistel no. 68 - Movitz i afton står baln
7. Epistel no. 28 - I går såg jag ditt barn, min Fröja
8. Epistel no. 48 - Solen glimmar blank och trind
9. Epistel no. 7 - Fram med basfiolen, knäpp och skruva
10. Epistel no. 81 - Märk hur vår skugga
11. Epistel no. 24 - Kära syster, mig nu lyster
12. Epistel no. 27 - Gubben är gammal, urverket dras
13. Epistel no. 71 - Ulla, min Ulla, säj, får jag dig bjuda
