= Bananskiva =

Studio album by Fred Åkerström
- Released: 1976
- Genre: Folk music Protest music Swedish folk music
- Label: Metronome Records

Fred Åkerström chronology
Glimmande nymf (1974)	Bananskiva (1976)	Vila vid denna källa (1977)

Bananskiva (English: Banana record, banana slice or, less commonly, banana feast) is a children's album by the Swedish folk singer-songwriter and guitar player Fred Åkerström together with Gösta Linderholm.

== Track listing ==
1. Banansång (Åkerström, Linderholm)
2. Hur bananerna är (Åkerström)
3. De goda (Gösta Linderholm)
4. I bananskogen (Åkerström, Linderholm)
5. I bananernas himmel (Gösta Linderholm)
6. Fyra bananer (Åkerström, Linderholm)
7. Banankyrkogården (Åkerström)
8. Vaggvisa för en liten grön banan (Åkerström, Linderholm)
9. Arg ung banan (Åkerström, Linderholm)
10. En gammal banans tankar (Åkerström)
11. Vad bananer tror (Åkerström, Linderholm)
12. Vad bananer vet (Åkerström)
13. Vad bananer vill (Linderholm)
14. De trofasta (Åkerström, Linderholm)
15. Under banaflaggan (Linderholm)
16. Bananriket (Åkerström)

== Personnel ==
- Fred Åkerström: Guitars, all vocals on tracks 2, 7, 10, 12 and 16, plus duet vocals on tracks 1, 4, 6, 8, 9, 11 and 14
- Gösta Linderholm: All vocals on tracks 3, 5, 13 and 15, plus duet vocals (with Fred) on tracks 1, 4, 6, 8, 9 11 and 14
