= Visor, svarta och röda =

Studio album by Cornelis Vreeswijk
- Released: 1972
- Recorded: September 14–17, 1972
- Studio: EMI Studios
- Genre: Folk music Protest music Swedish folk music
- Label: EMI
- Producer: Göte Wilhelmson

Cornelis Vreeswijk chronology
Spring mot Ulla, spring! Cornelis sjunger Bellman (1971)	Visor, svarta och röda (1972)	Istället för vykort (1973)

Visor, svarta och röda (English: Songs, black and red) is a studio album by the Swedish-Dutch folk singer-songwriter Cornelis Vreeswijk. For this recording, Vreeswijk sings songs with lyrics by Swedish writer Lars Forsell.

== Track listing ==
- Lyrics by Lars Forssell. Music as noted.
1. "Staffan var en stalledräng" (Kjell Andersson) - 3:00
2. "Helena (She's An Easy Rider)" (Tucker Zimmerman) - 3:21
3. "Desertören (Le déserteur)" (Boris Vian) - 2:40
4. "Till herr Andersson" (Cornelis Vreeswijk) - 3:18
5. "Djävulens sång (Le Gorille)" (Georges Brassens) - 2:21
6. "Ulla Winblad" (Pierre Ström) - 1:36
7. "Menuett på Haga (La Polka du roi)" (Charles Trenet) - 3:03
8. "Jack uppskäraren" (Kjell Andersson) - 3:29
9. "Jenny Jansson (Jenny Jenkins)" (trad.; arr.: Kjell Andersson) - 2:22
10. "The Establishment" (Cornelis Vreeswijk)- 2:23
11. "Avanti Popolo" (trad.arr.: Kjell Andersson) - 1:57
12. "Vaggvisa för Bim, Cornelis och alla andra människor på jorden" (Kjell Andersson) - 2:44
