= Felicia's svenska suite =

Studio album by Cornelis Vreeswijk
- Released: 1978
- Genre: Folk music Protest music Swedish folk music
- Label: dB Records; Sonet Records

Cornelis Vreeswijk chronology
Narrgnistor 2, En halv böj blues och andra ballader (1978)	Felicia's svenska suite (1978)	Vildhallon (1979)

Felicia's svenska suite, (English: Felicia's Swedish suite) is a music album recorded by the Swedish-Dutch folk singer-songwriter Cornelis Vreeswijk in 1978. Many of the songs feature Felicia, a woman character from Aksel Sandemose's 1958 novel Varulven.

== Track listing ==
=== Con amore ===
1. "En duva till Felicia"
2. "Från en vän i viken"
3. "Felicias sonett"
4. "Felicia pratar..."
5. "Hon säger"
6. "Varulven"
7. "För gröna Felicia"

=== Lamentoso ===
1. "Klagovisa till Felicia"
2. "Vari Felicia beklagar sig (ty hon är förolämpad)"
3. "Gideon till Plautus"
4. "Till en nymf"
5. "Dubbelquatrin om tennis"

=== Furioso ===
1. "Byt nu ton"
2. "Polaren Per gör sin reverens"
3. "Möte med Fredrik Åkare, Stockholm 1943"
4. "Ballad om olika segelytor"
5. "De fattiga riddarnas ballad"
6. "Tre dagars blues"

=== Dubioso ===
1. "Turistens klagan"
2. "Rörande min Harpa"
3. "Balladen om Gustava"
4. "Vid råken"
5. "Felicia adjö"
