= Cornelis sjunger Povel =

Studio album by Cornelis Vreeswijk
- Released: 1980
- Genre: Folk music Protest music Swedish folk music
- Label: Sir

Cornelis Vreeswijk chronology
Bananer - bland annat (1980)	Cornelis sjunger Povel (1980)	Hommager och Pamfletter (1981)

Cornelis sjunger Povel (English: Cornelis sings Povel) is a music album recorded by Swedish-Dutch folk singer-songwriter Cornelis Vreeswijk in 1981. It is an homage to composer and lyricist Povel Ramel.

Issued as double LP in 1981 titled as "Alla vi har varit små" och "The Gräsänkling blues", it was re-issued on CD in 2007 under title Diamanter.

== Track listing ==
=== CD1 - "Alla har vi varit små" ===
1. "Alla har vi varit små"
2. "Tänk dej en strut karameller"
3. "Varför är där ingen is till punschen?"
4. "Den sista jäntan"
5. "Johanssons boogie woogie-vals"
6. "Måste vägen till Curaçao gynga så?"
7. "Turion, Turion vem står i tur?"
8. "Sommartrivialiteter"
9. "Sorglösa brunn"

=== CD2 - "The gräsänkling blues" ===
1. "The gräsänkling blues"
2. "En schlager i Sverige"
3. "The purjolök song"
4. "Törstigaste bröder"
5. "Hommage till Povel"
6. "Tjo va´de´va´livat i holken i lördags"
7. "Underbart är kort"
8. "En vilsen folkvisa"
9. "De sista entusiasterna"
10. "Håll musiken igång"

== Charts ==
Chart (1981)	Peak position
Swedish Albums (Sverigetopplistan)	33
