= Doktor Dolittle =

1967 studio album by Per Myrberg, Siw Malmkvist, Svante Thuresson and Fred Åkerström

Studio album by Per Myrberg Siw Malmkvist Svante Thuresson Fred Åkerström
- Released: 1967
- Genres: Schlager music Musical

Doktor Dolittle is an album by Swedish singers Per Myrberg, Siw Malmkvist, Svante Thuresson and Fred Åkerström.
