= Fred Åkerström =

Swedish musician and singer

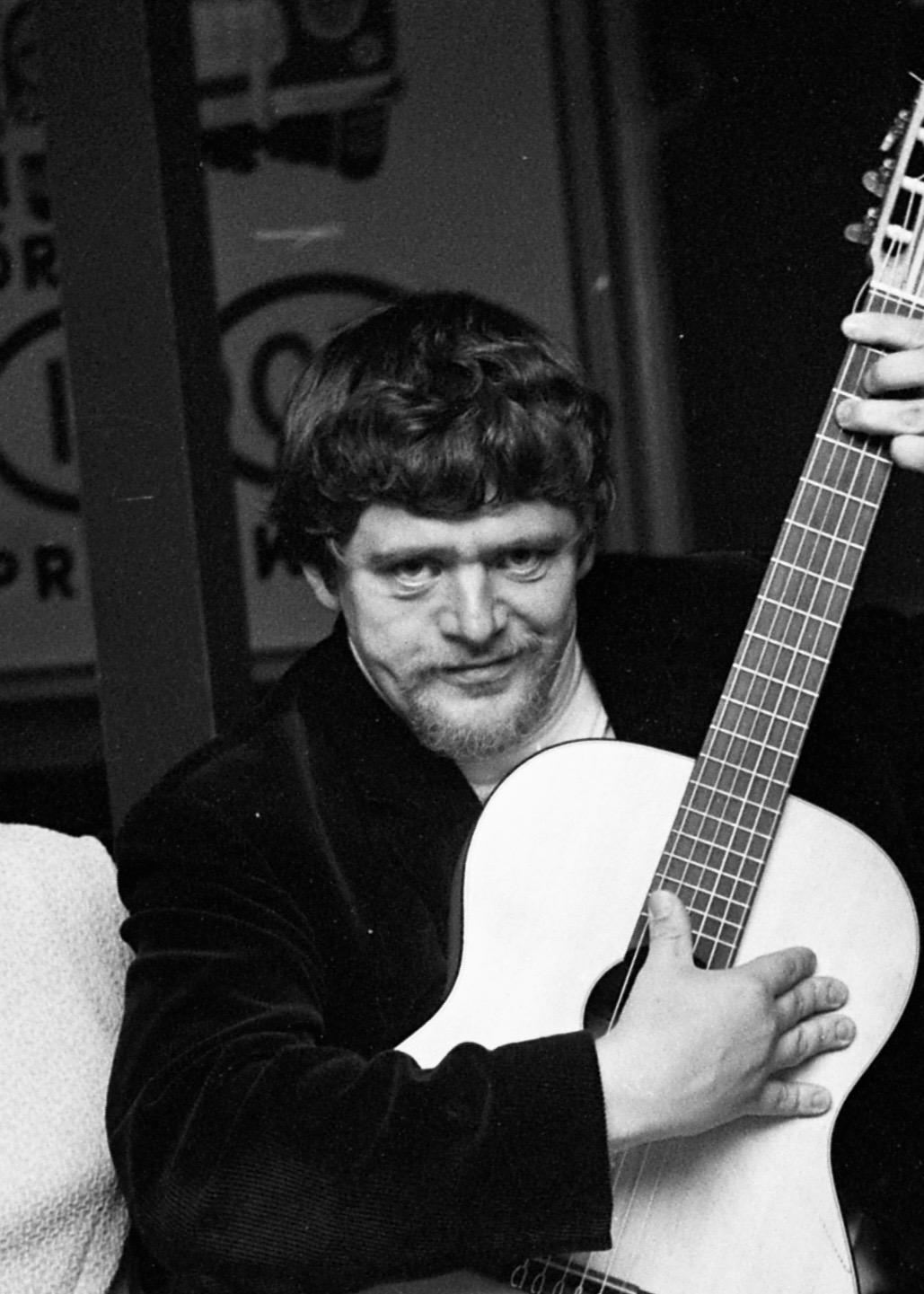
- Åkerström in 1969
- Born: Bo Gunnar Åkerström; 27 January 1937; Stockholm, Sweden
- Died: 9 August 1985 (aged 48); Karlskrona, Sweden
- Other name: Fred Åkerström
- Musical career
- Genres: Folk music
- Occupations: Musician, singer, songwriter, actor
- Instruments: Vocals, guitar
- Years active: 1963–1985
- Label: Metronome Studios

Fred Bo Gunnar Åkerström (born Bo Gunnar; 27 January 1937 – 9 August 1985) was a Swedish singer, activist, and theatre actor. Regarded as one of the greatest interpreters of Carl Michael Bellman, he is noted for his resonant bass-baritone voice and emotional performances. Debuting during the folk music revival in the early 1960s, he covered several socially conscious and sentimental ballads by both notable and obscure Swedish poets.

== Life ==
Åkerström was born in Stockholm to a family of meager circumstances, which would later influence the social, economic, and political criticisms found in many of his works and public appearances. He aspired at an early age to become a vissångare, after having heard local singer-songwriter Ruben Nilson (1893-1971). After performances at the famous Vispråmen Storken, a barge in Stockholm where folksingers performed, he released his first record in 1963, Fred Åkerström sjunger Ruben Nilson. He was a contemporary of Cornelis Vreeswijk, and the two were at times very close, touring together and releasing a joint record early in their careers. He became an alcoholic in later life. His daughter CajsaStina Åkerström is also a singer.

=== Bellman interpreter ===
Like Vreeswijk, Åkerström was a major interpreter of Carl Michael Bellman's songs, giving them "a new and more powerful expression" than they had had before, starting with his live performance of one of Fredman's Epistles, "Nå skruva fiolen" in 1964. Åkerström believed that Bellman had been misinterpreted by an earlier generation of artists: far from being a jolly and romantic person, Bellman was, Åkerström thought, an accurate social reporter of poverty, sickness, death and suffering. Åkerström published ten albums containing Bellman songs, of which three were dedicated to that subject: Fred sjunger Bellman in 1969; Glimmande nymf in 1974; and Vila vid denna källa in 1977. His performances increased in intensity until it seemed to audience and critics that Åkerström was identifying himself with Bellman. In his book Ingenstans fri som en fågel, Peter Mosskin wrote of Åkerström that no-one in two hundred years had succeeded better at bringing Bellman to life, making the story of his music an important element in Swedish cultural history. His later Bellman recordings combined his guitar with cello and flute.

=== Political views ===
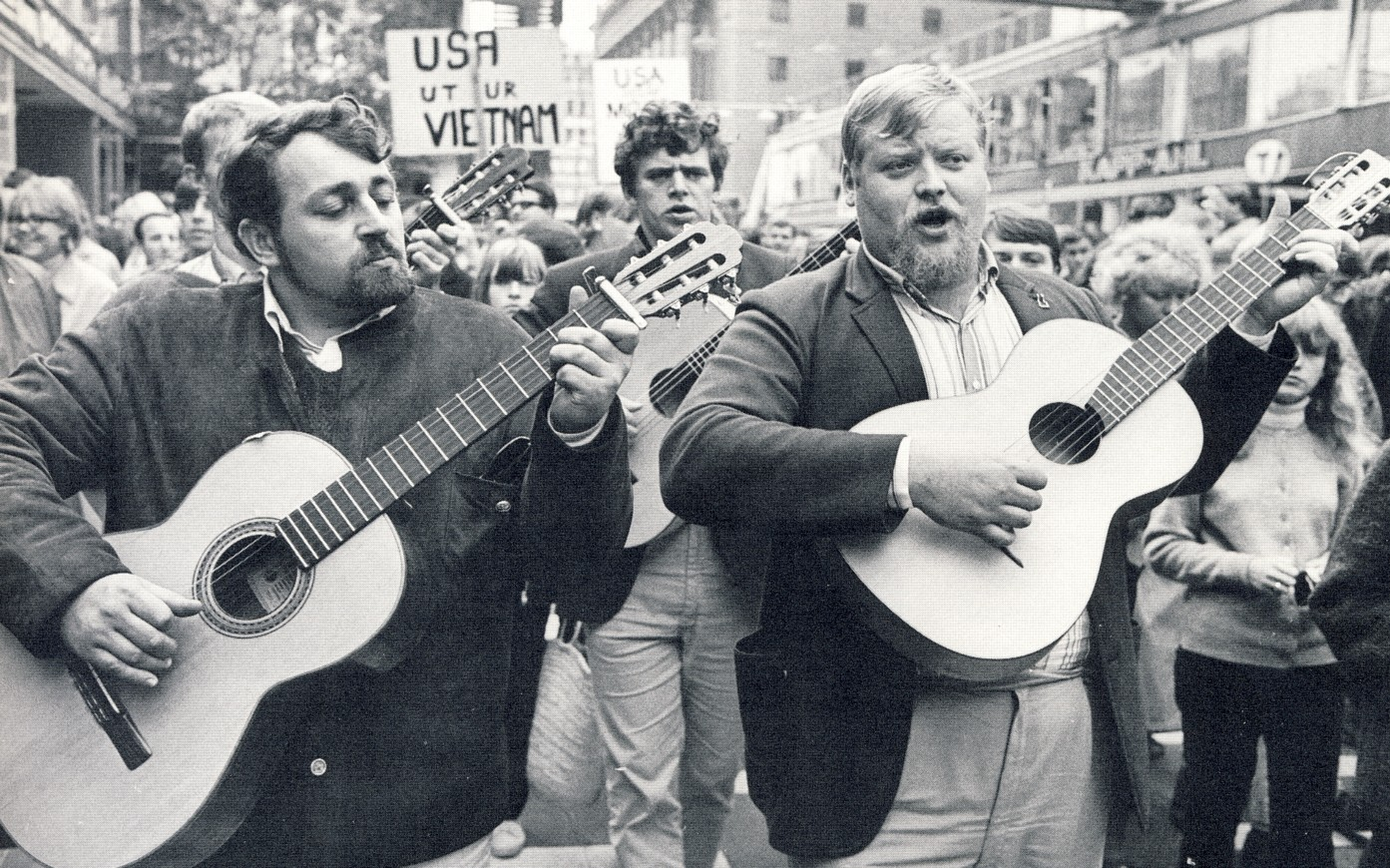
L-R: Cornelis Vreeswijk, Fred Åkerström, and Gösta Cervin in a protest march against the Vietnam War at Hötorget, Stockholm, in 1965

In the late 1960s, Åkerström was influenced by left wing politics and started recording more political songs such as Kapitalismen (Capitalism) which originally was a danish protest song written by Per Dich. He also joined the Communist Party (known then as KPML(r)) and published the songs under their record label Proletärkultur

== Discography ==
- Fred Åkerström sjunger Ruben Nilson (1963)
- Fred besjunger Frida (1964), visor by Birger Sjöberg
- Visor och oförskämdheter (1964), concert tour recordings with Cornelis Vreeswijk och Ann-Louise Hanson
- Visor i närheten (1965) visor by Fritz Sjöström
- Doktor Dolittle (1965)
- Dagsedlar åt kapitalismen (1967)
- Fred sjunger Bellman (1969) Bellman interpretations
- Mera Ruben Nilson (1971)
- Två tungor (1972), includes song "Jag ger dig min morgon"
- Glimmande nymf (1974) with Trio CMB (guitar, flute, cello) Bellman interpretations
- Bananskiva (1976)
- Vila vid denna källa (1977) with Trio CMB (guitar, flute, cello) Bellman interpretations
- Sjöfolk och landkrabbor (1978)
- Åkerströms blandning (1982)
