= Cornelis Vreeswijk =

Dutch singer-songwriter and poet active in Sweden (1937–1987)

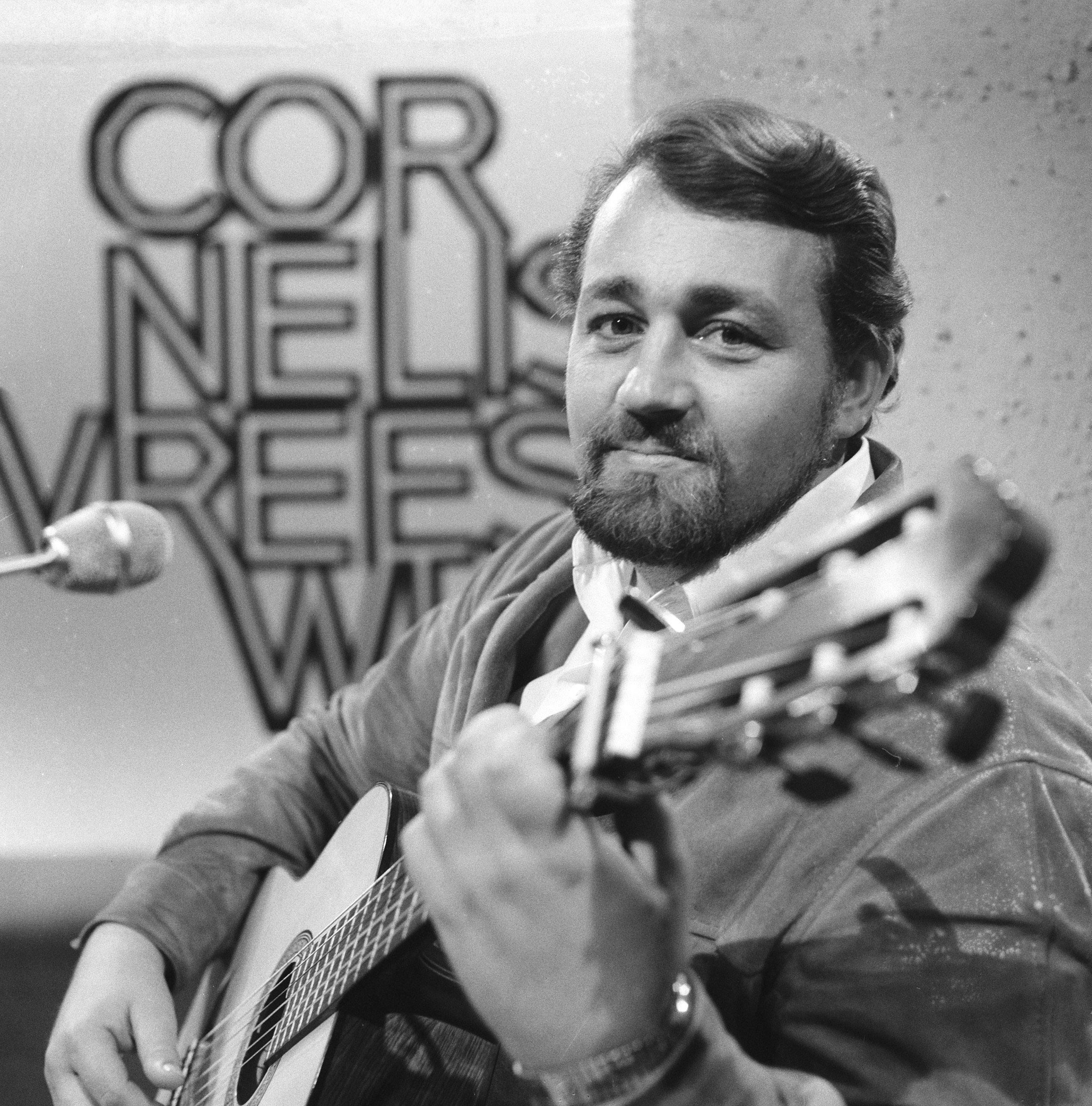
- Vreeswijk in 1966
- Born: 8 August 1937; IJmuiden, Netherlands
- Died: 12 November 1987 (aged 50); Stockholm, Sweden
- Burial place: Katarina Church, Stockholm
- Citizenship: Netherlands
- Occupations: Troubadour, singer-songwriter, poet
- Years active: 1964–1987
- Spouses: Anita Strandell (m. 1978–1981) Bim Warne (m. 1970–1975) Ingalill Rehnberg (m. 1962–1968)
- Children: Jack Vreeswijk
- Website: www.cornelis.se

Cornelis Vreeswijk (Note: Swedish pronunciation; Dutch pronunciation) (8 August 1937 – 12 November 1987) was a Dutch singer-songwriter and poet who lived and worked primarily in Sweden.

Despite being born in the Netherlands and never acquiring Swedish citizenship, Vreeswijk is regarded as one of the country's most influential and beloved troubadours, often being compared to other national poets, such as Evert Taube and Carl Michael Bellman for his poetic lyrics and social commentary.

Vreeswijk's compositions often focused on themes of love, poverty, and substance abuse. His unique style blended elements of folk, jazz, blues, and bossa nova, which modernized the Scandinavian ballad tradition.

In 2010, the Swedish drama film Cornelis, directed by Amir Chamdin, was made about his life.

== Early life and education ==
Cornelis Vreeswijk was born and grew up in the Netherlands, born to Dutch parents in IJmuiden. He emigrated to Sweden with his parents in 1949 at the age of twelve. He left school in 1955 and went to sea, where he passed the time playing the blues. He returned to Sweden in 1959. He was educated as a social worker at Stockholm University and hoped to become a journalist, but became increasingly involved in music, performing at events for students with idiosyncratic humor and social engagement.

== Swedish career ==
Vreeswijk explained in one of his few interviews that he had taught himself to sing and play in the fifties by imitating his first idols Josh White and Lead Belly. His first album, Ballader och oförskämdheter (Ballads and rudenesses, 1964), was a hit which immediately gained him a large following among the emerging radical student generation. In this period he also played with Swedish jazz pianist Jan Johansson and his trio. His songs "Ångbåtsblues" ("Steam Boat Blues") and "Jubelvisa för Fiffiga Nanette" ("Joyful song for Clever Nanette") are classics from these recordings. His abrasive, frequently political lyrics and unconventional delivery were a deliberate break with what he was later to describe as a Swedish song tradition of pretty singing and harmless lyrics, "a hobby for the upper classes". Influenced by jazz and blues and especially by the singing style and social criticism of Georges Brassens, Vreeswijk "speak-sings" his "insults", and compels his listeners to pay close attention to the words.

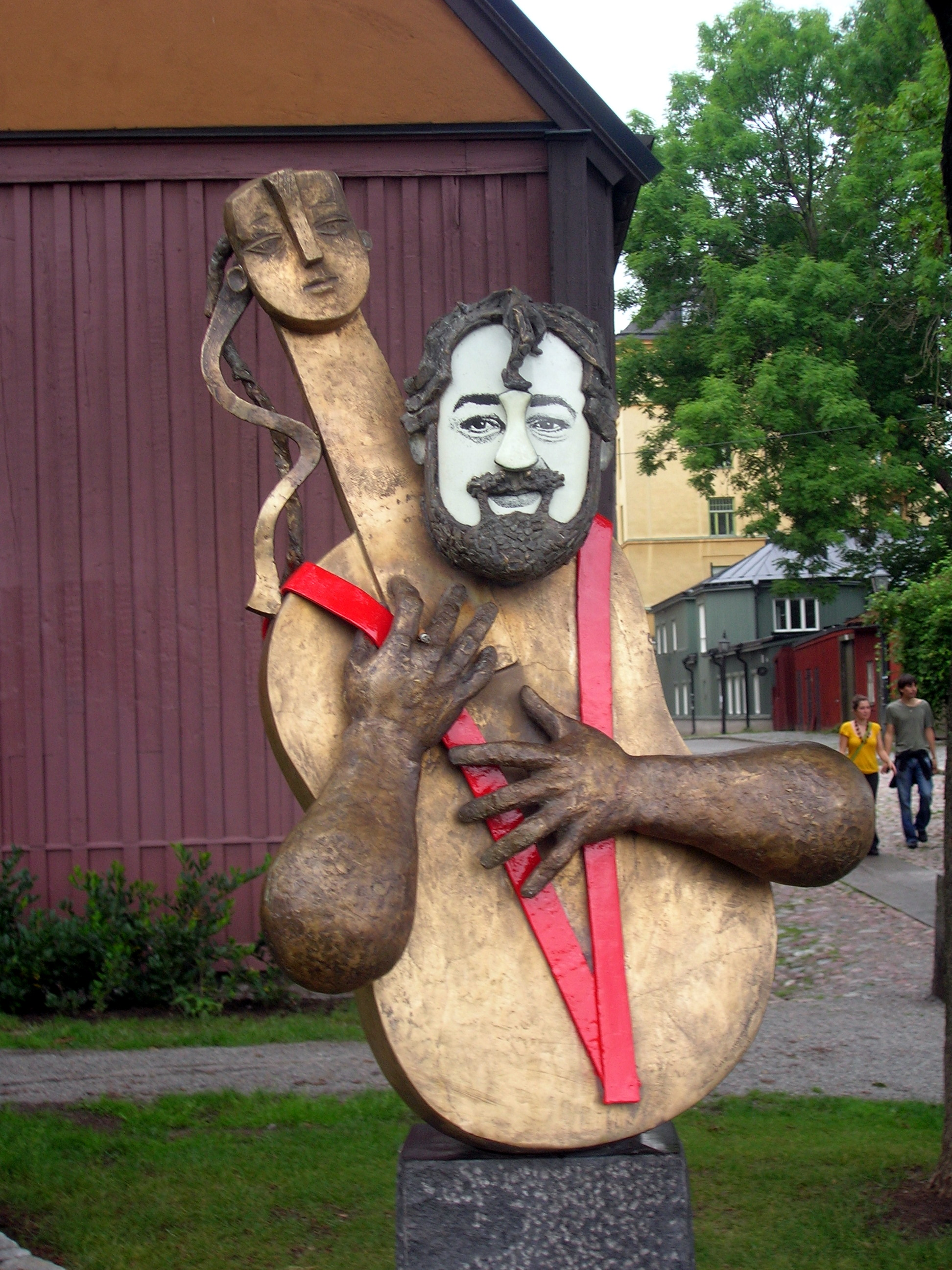
Sculpture of Cornelis Vreeswijk, as displayed in Cornelis Park in Stockholm

His translation of Allan Sherman's masterpiece "Hello Muddah, Hello Fadduh" remains beloved to Swedes as "Brev från kolonien" (Letter from the summer camp) decades later, and could be said to have passed into folklore.

A political singer with a bohemian lifestyle, Vreeswijk remained controversial in the sixties and early seventies, idolized by his fans but disapproved of by many others for his "rude" language and persistent interest in "unsuitable" people like prostitutes and criminals. Some of his records were blacklisted by the public broadcasting company Sveriges Radio. During this period, he not only wrote and recorded songs now considered classics, such as "Sportiga Marie" ("Sporty Marie") and several affectionate salutes to the ever less employable "Polaren Pär" ("My Buddy Pär"), but he was an actor on the stage, receiving considerable critical acclaim, most notably as Pilate in the Swedish version of Jesus Christ Superstar, and as Tevye in Fiddler on the Roof. He participated in Melodifestivalen (the Swedish preselection for the Eurovision Song Contest) in 1972 with "Önskar du mig, så önskar jag dig", which finished sixth. He also appeared in movies, including Svarta Palmkronor (Black Palm Trees, 1968), which was filmed on location in Brazil. Spending four months in Brazil began Vreeswijk's lifelong interest in Latin American music and social and political conditions, later seen for example in his Victor Jara album of 1978.

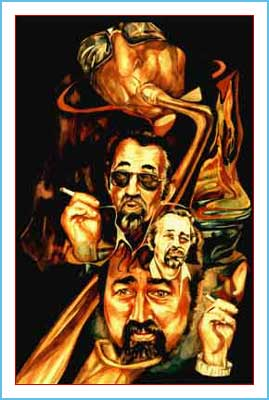
Portrait of Cornelis Vreeswijk by the Swedish painter Tommy Tallstig

Later in his career, Vreeswijk was to gain increasing fame and a wider audience both for his songs and his other work. He published several volumes of poetry in his lifetime and left a considerable manuscript legacy of poems which have been published since. He also became an important musical interpreter of the works of other people, recording the songs of Carl Michael Bellman, Evert Taube, and Lars Forssell. His fresh, bluesy renderings of Bellman and Taube, who had up to then been classics belonging to the "harmless" tradition that Vreeswijk despised, were artistic and commercial successes which extended his fanbase. The choice of Bellman was significant: Bellman's lively, romantic, pastoral, drinking and sometimes bawdy songs gained Vreeswijk the reputation of being a drunken womaniser, with the association of being "something of a Bellman himself". Like his friend Fred Åkerström, he gave Bellman's songs, "a new and more powerful expression" than they had had before, and like him identifying himself with Bellman's fictional character Fredman, expressing his drunkenness, poverty, and despair, with an intensity that increased in his performances over the years. Bellman's songs featured in many of his performances; two of his albums were dedicated to Bellman's songs, namely the 1971 Spring mot Ulla, spring! Cornelis sjunger Bellman containing 13 of Fredman's Epistles, and the 1977 Movitz! Movitz!, containing 12: the popular Epistle 81, Märk hur vår skugga, appears on both albums.

Vreeswijk's own best-known songs of the later seventies and early eighties tend to be dark in tone, like "Sist jag åkte jumbojet blues" ("Last time I Went by Jumbojet Blues", a metaphorical bad trip) and "Blues för Fatumeh", both addressing heavy drug addiction. Even though in this period Vreeswijk was a prey of tabloid scandal and in the news for his drinking problem and his debts (about both of which he spoke with frankness) rather than for his achievements, he remained highly productive. He is also known as the co-writer of the Hep Stars song "Speleman" which was released for their album Songs We Sang 68.

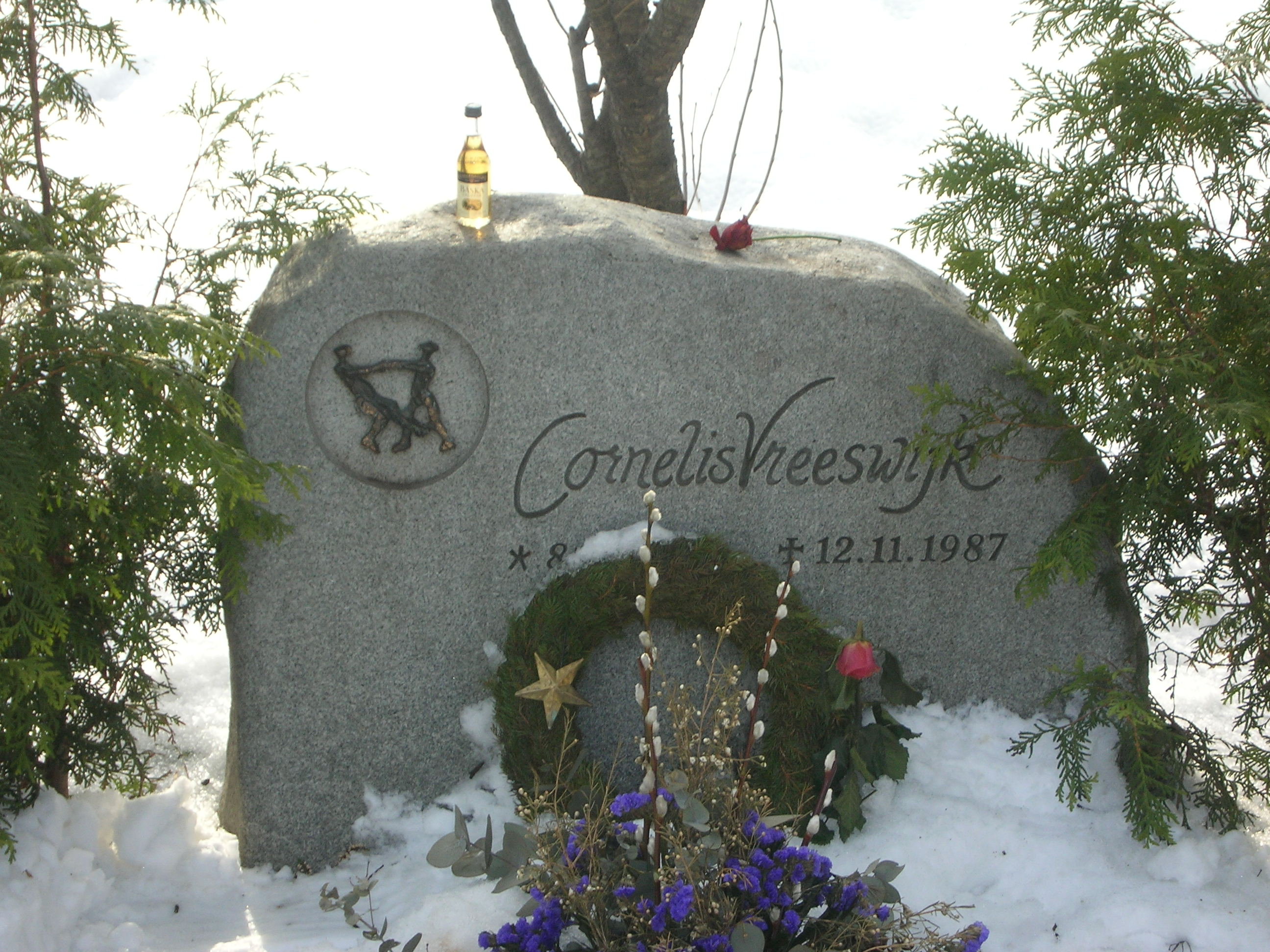
Vreeswijk's tombstone at Katarina kyrka

Towards the end of his life his reputation soared again, aided by the televising of some highly regarded nightclub shows, and by Agneta Brunius' TV documentary Balladen om den flygande holländaren (The Ballad of the Flying Dutchman) in 1986. By the time of his death from liver cancer at the age of fifty, Vreeswijk had become an icon of the Swedish music scene, and he was honored with burial at the cemetery of Katarina kyrka, a national cemetery in Stockholm. It was broadcast live on Swedish television. In 2010, Cornelis, a movie about his life, premiered in Swedish cinemas. Norwegian singer Hans Erik Dyvik Husby (previously in Turbonegro) played the role of Vreeswijk.

== Dutch career ==
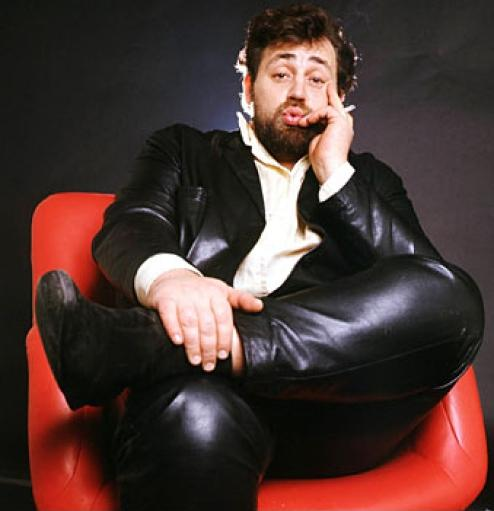
Cornelis Vreeswijk (1967)

In 1966, the Dutch broadcasting organisation VARA invited Vreeswijk to the Netherlands. He translated several of his songs into Dutch, and wrote a couple of new ones. One of his songs, "De nozem en de non" ("The Greaser and the Nun"), was released as a single, without much popular success. His first Dutch album was only released in 1972, after ten successful Swedish albums. 100,000 copies of Cornelis Vreeswijk were sold, and the single "Veronica" became a big hit after it was picked up by the pirate radio station Veronica. His old song "De nozem en de non" was then re-recorded and released with much success. His later albums could not match the success of the first one, and Vreeswijk never achieved the fame in the Netherlands that he did in Sweden.

Nowadays, only "De nozem en de non" is still known by the general Dutch public. Vreeswijk still has some fans in the Netherlands, however, and in 2000 the Cornelis Vreeswijk society was founded.

One reason for his lack of popularity in the Netherlands was the impression that he was a bit old-fashioned. Because of his long stay in Sweden, though he never became a citizen, the Dutch pronunciation and idiom that he had learned to speak in his youth were out-of-date in the seventies and eighties.

Although he was fluent in both Dutch and Swedish, the latter became his primary language. His Stockholm-accented Swedish was famously witty and expressive.

== Later life ==
He gave his last concert in Uppsala in September 1987, suffering from liver cancer and diabetes. He recorded his last album and a book of poetry, both entitled Till Fatumeh. He travelled one last time to the Netherlands to see his family, returned to Stockholm and died soon afterwards.

== Discography ==
=== Swedish ===
Main article – Cornelis Vreeswijk's Swedish discography

=== Dutch ===
- 1972 – Cornelis Vreeswijk
- 1973 – Leven en laten leven
- 1974 – Liedjes voor de Pijpendraaier en mijn Zoetelief
- 1976 – Foto's en een souvenir: Vreeswijk zingt Croce
- 1977 – Het recht om in vrede te leven
- 1978 – Het beste van Cornelis Vreeswijk
- 1982 – Ballades van de gewapende bedelaar
- 2005 - " Het Mooiste van Cornelis Vreeswijk"

== Bibliography ==
- En handfull gräs, 1970.
- I stället för vykort, 1974. ISBN 91-1-731331-7
- Felicias svenska suite, 1978. ISBN 82-03-09752-9
- Till Fatumeh, 1987. ISBN 91-7608-384-5
- Till Fatumeh (paperback), 1989. ISBN 91-7642-471-5
- Sånger, ed. Jan-Erik Vold, 1988. ISBN 91-7608-399-3
- Dikter, ed. Jan-Erik Vold, 1989. ISBN 91-7608-439-6
- Osjungna sånger, 1990. ISBN 91-7608-488-4
- Skrifter, ed. Jan-Erik Vold, 2000:
  - Samlade sånger. ISBN 91-7324-770-7
  - Enskilda sånger. ISBN 91-7324-770-7
  - Dikter Prosa Tolkningar. ISBN 91-7324-771-5

Anthology

- En bok om Cornelis (chosen texts, articles and interviews), Ordfront Förlag, 2000. ISBN 91-7324-798-7

Also appears on

- Beginner's Guide to Scandinavia (3 CDs, Nascente 2011)

== Sources ==
- Rolf Fridholm, Polarn Cornelis, 1989. ISBN 91-7029-016-4
- Klas Widén, Cornelis Vreeswijk: En förteckning över hans produktion med kort biografi, 1991.
- Ulf Carlsson, Cornelis Vreeswijk: Artist-vispoet-lyriker, 1996. ISBN 91-564-1025-5
- Rolf Fridholm, Medborgare! En vänbok om Cornelis, 1996. ISBN 91-88144-25-9
- Oscar Hedlund, Scener ur en äventyrares liv, 2000. ISBN 91-34-51809-6
- Klas Gustafson, Ett bluesliv_: Berättelsen om Cornelis Vreeswijk, 2006. ISBN 978-91-7343-199-6
- Rutger Vahl, Misschien wordt `t morgen beter, 2014. ISBN 978-90-388-9871-1
