= Iron Mask (band) =

Belgian power metal band

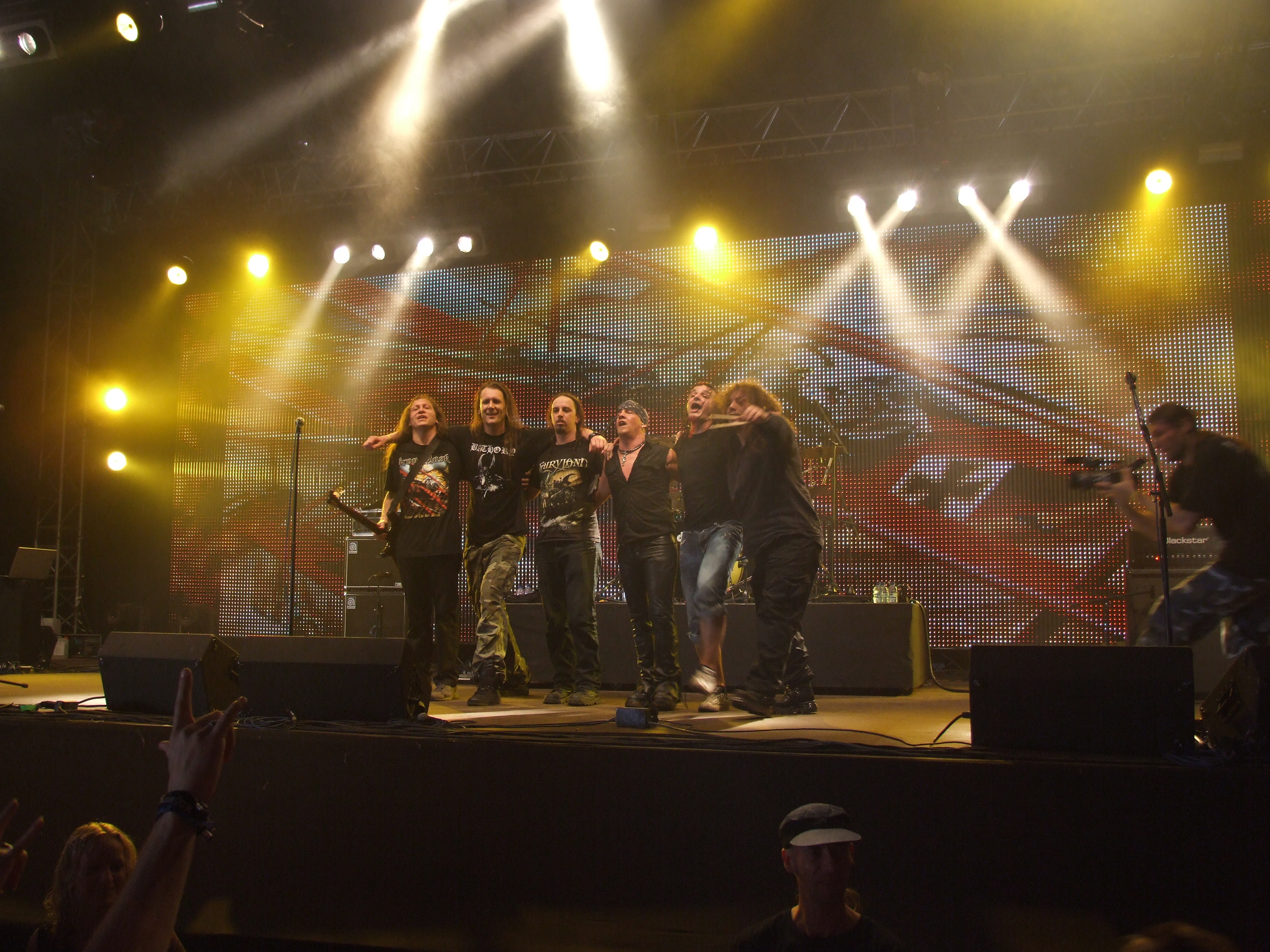
- Iron Mask at Graspop Metal Meeting 2010

Background information
- Origin: Brussels, Belgium
- Genres: Power metal
- Years active: 2002–present
- Labels: AFM Records, Lion Music, Marquee/Avalon
- Members: Dushan Petrossi; Mark Boals; Vassili Moltchanov; Ramy Ali
- Website: www.iron-mask.com

Iron Mask is a power metal band formed in 2002 by Belgian guitarist Dushan Petrossi, also known from Magic Kingdom.

== History ==
=== Revenge Is My Name (2002–2005) ===
Petrossi signed with Lion Music in early 2002 to record a side project, Iron Mask. The band’s name and some songs of the first album were based on the book Man in the Iron Mask by Alexander Dumas. The album was titled Revenge Is My Name. Bass was recorded by Vassili Moltchanov (Magic Kingdom, Cryme), vocals were performed by Phil Letaw (Karyan, Cryme, Stormy Night), keyboards - by Youri De Groote.

=== Hordes of the Brave (2005–2009) ===
In April 2005, Iron Mask had a different line up for the album Hordes of the Brave. The band inaugurated Goetz "Valhalla Jr" Mohr (Arrow, Hanz Damf, Rolf Munkes) as vocalist. Guest vocalist Oliver Hartmann (At Vance, Avantasia, Edguy, Aina, Magic Kingdom, Freedom Call, Helloween) added vocals to three tracks. The keyboardist Richard Andersson (Majestic, Time Requiem, Space Odyssey, Karmakanic, Evil Masquerade, Adagio, Silver Seraph) is responsible for all the keyboards solos on Hordes of the Brave.

In November 2005 the band gave several concerts in Europe to promote Hordes of the Brave, touring with Canadian heavy metal veterans Anvil and Phantom X. The shows were filmed, and as a result in 2008, Iron Mask contributed to documentary film about Anvil, called Anvil! The Story of Anvil, as well as to soundtrack for the film.

=== Shadow of the Red Baron (2009–2011) ===
In 2009, the band's third album, entitled Shadow of the Red Baron, was released. Petrossi wrote and produced eleven songs. The vocals were performed by Goetz "Valhalla Jr." Mohr on all songs, with the exception of "Dreams", which was sung by backing vocalist Oliver Hartmann. Another guest was Lars Eric Mattsson who played the third guitar solo on "Sahara". Still on bass guitar was Vassili Moltchanov, but a new drummer was found in Erik Stout (Vengeance, Joe Stump, Daize Shayne); keyboards were played by Andreas Lindahl (Wuthering Heights, The Murder of My Sweet, Narnia, Loch Vostok, Audiovision, Manticora, ZooL, Platitude). As with the previous album, Roma Siadletski (Magic Kingdom) performed extreme vocals. Jens Bogren (Symphony X, Opeth, Soilwork, Paradise Lost, Universum, Amon Amarth, Collarbone) was responsible for the sound.

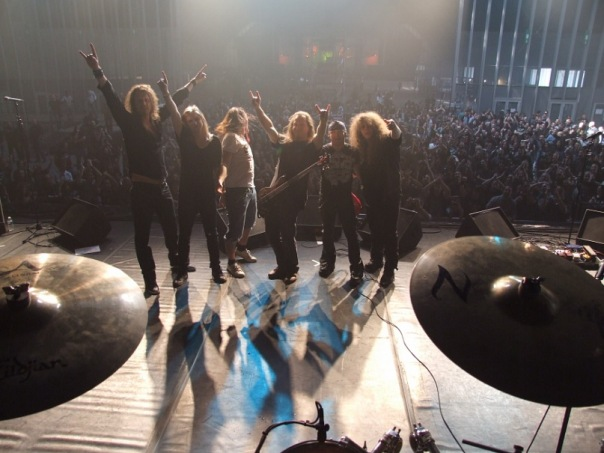
Iron Mask at Power & Prog Metal Fest 2011

Due to vocalist Goetz "Valhalla Jr." Mohr's health problems, Iron Mask brought Carsten "Lizard" Schulz (Domain, Altaria, Shining Line, Eden's Curse) to perform vocal duties at their appearance at Graspop Metal Meeting on 26 June 2010 in Dessel, Belgium. There were also a couple of other lineup changes: Ramy Ali (Freedom Call, Kiske/Somerville, Evidence One, State of Rock) was the band's new drummer. Philippe Giordana (Magic Kingdom, Fairyland, Kerion) handled the keys as Andreas Lindahl was tied with other work engagements. On 4 December 2010 the same band-lineup performed at Frostrock metal festival (Kuurne, Belgium), the other participants - At Vance, ReVamp, Primal Fear.

=== Black as Death (2011–2013) ===
On 30 April 2011, the band played a concert at Power & Prog Metal Fest (Mons, Belgium) alongside Europe, HammerFall, Gamma Ray and Vanden Plas.

In July 2011 the band announced that for the forthcoming album Black as Death part of vocal duties would be performed by ex-Yngwie Malmsteen singers Mark Boals (Royal Hunt, Ring of Fire) and Göran Edman (Karmakanic, Brazen Abbot, Jayce Landberg, Time Requiem). Mats Olausson (Yngwie Malmsteen, Ark, Evil Masquerade, John Norum) will be responsible for all the keyboard parts. The mix and production will be done by Denis Ward (Pink Cream 69). For the album the band signed in September 2011 with AFM Records. Black as Death was released on 16 December 2011.

=== Fifth Son of Winterdoom (2013–2014) ===
In 2013 Iron Mask announced the forthcoming of 5th studio album Fifth Son of Winterdoom. The album was released on 8 November 2013 by AFM Records with Mark Boals on vocals.

=== Diabolica (2014–present) ===
In July 2014 the band started working on a new studio album, and two years later, it was announced that the band's next studio album, Diabolica, would be released on 23 September 2016, on AFM Records with Diego Valdez on vocals.

== Members ==
=== Current lineup ===
- Mark Boals - vocals (2010-2014, 2026–present)
- Dushan Petrossi - guitar (2002–present)
- Vassili Moltchanov - bass (2002–present)
- Ramy Ali - drums (2010–present)

=== Former Members ===
- Phil Letawe - vocals (2002-2003)
- Goetz "Valhalla Jr." Mohr - vocals (2003-2010)
- Roma Siadletski - vocals (2008-2012)
- Artur Almeida - vocals (2015-2016)
- Diego Valdez - vocals (2016-2019)
- Mike Slembrouck - vocals (2019-2026)
- Anton Arkhipov - drums (2002-2006)
- Erik Stout - drums (2007-2008)
- Mike Terrana - drums (2008-2010)
- Youri Degroote - keyboards (2002-2003)
- Richard Andersson - keyboards (2003-2008)
- Andreas Lindhal - keyboards (2008-2010)
- Mats Olausson - keyboards (2010-2012; died 2015)

=== Live Members ===
- Oliver Hartmann - vocals (2009-2010)
- Carsten "Lizard" Schulz - vocals (2011)
- Steve Williams - keyboards (2011)

== Discography ==
=== Studio albums ===
- Revenge Is My Name (2002)
- Hordes of the Brave (2005)
- Shadow of the Red Baron (2009)
- Black as Death (2011)
- Fifth Son of Winterdoom (2013)
- Diabolica (2016)
- Master of Masters (2020)

=== Contributions ===
- V/A - Beyond Inspiration: A Tribute to Uli Jon Roth (2003, Lion Music) - "Yellow Raven"
- V/A - Blackmore's Castle vol.1: A Tribute to Deep Purple & Rainbow (2003, Lion Music) - "Gates of Babylon"
- V/A - Give Us Moore!: A Tribute to Gary Moore (2004, Lion Music) - "Out in the Fields"
- V/A - Anvil! The Story of Anvil: Soundtrack (2008) - "Holy War"
- V/A - Embrace the Sun - Lion Music Japan Benefit Album (2011, Lion Music) - "Sons of the Sun"

=== Music videos ===
- 2002 Revenge Is My Name
- 2010 Forever in the Dark
- 2012 God Punishes, I Kill
- 2013 Rock Religion
- 2016 I don't forget, I don't forgive
- 2020 Tree Of The World
