= Revenge Is My Name =

Studio album by Iron Mask
- Released: December 31, 2002
- Recorded: 2002
- Genre: Neoclassical metal, power metal
- Length: 50:40
- Label: Marquee/Avalon, Lion Music
- Producer: Dushan Petrossi

Iron Mask chronology
Revenge Is My Name (2002)	Hordes of the Brave (2005)

Revenge Is My Name is the first studio album by Belgian band Iron Mask, released on December 31, 2002 by Lion Music. All songs were composed by Dushan Petrossi.

Tha album was rated eight out of ten stars by Disagreement.net.

== Track listing ==
1. "Enemy Brother Overture" – 0:57
2. "Revenge Is My Name" – 4:42
3. "March of Victory" – 5:12
4. "The Witch Burner" – 4:51
5. "Alien Pharao" – 5:06
6. "Dimension X" – 0:50
7. "Morgana's Castle" – 5:11
8. "You Are My Blood" – 5:13
9. "The Wolf and the Beast" – 8:13
10. "Secret Tunnel of the King" – 2:47
11. "Hold the Light" – 4:47
12. "Warchild Requiem" – 2:51

== Personnel ==
- Dushan Petrossi - all electric and acoustic guitars, keyboards, backing vocals, timpani
- Phil Letawe - lead and backing vocals
- Vassili Moltchanov - bass, flute
- Youri Degroote - keyboards, piano, harpsichord, backing vocals, first lead vocal on 9, voice from space on 6
- Anton Arkhipov - drums
- Marie-Carmen Mendez - violin
- Andrew Martin - clarinet
- Paul Lemoine - contra bass
- Michel Rossi - orchestra belga conducting
- Roma Siadletski - backing vocals
- Madi Hoffman - backing vocals
- Sonia Algar - backing vocals
- Sumer T. David - backing vocals
- Lili Petrovski - backing vocals
- Peter Dierickx - drums
- Max Leclerq - lead vocals on 11
- Guillaume Bideau (Mnemic, Scarve) - backing vocals on 11
- Aymeric Ribot - keyboards on 11
- Didier Chesneau - engineering and mixing on 9
- Eric Philippe - artwork, logo, cover design

=== Production ===
- Dushan Petrossi - production, mixing
- Youri Degroote - engineering, mixing, mastering
