= Hordes of the Brave =

Album by Iron Mask

Studio album by Iron Mask
- Released: April 22, 2005
- Recorded: 2005
- Genre: Neo-classical metal Power metal
- Length: 59:24
- Label: Marquee/Avalon, Lion Music
- Producer: Dushan Petrossi

Iron Mask chronology
Revenge Is My Name (2002)	Hordes of the Brave (2005)	Shadow of the Red Baron (2009)

Hordes of the Brave is the second studio album by Belgian band Iron Mask, released on April 22, 2005, by Lion Music. All songs were composed by Dushan Petrossi.

== Track listing ==
1. "Holy War" – 5:12
2. "Freedom's Blood - The Patriot" – 4:31
3. "Time" – 5:08
4. "The Invisible Empire" – 5:34
5. "Demon's Child" – 5:38
6. "High in the Sky" – 4:46
7. "Alexander the Great — Hordes of the Brave (Pt. 1)" – 6:45
8. "Crystal Tears" – 4:04
9. "Iced Wind of the North" – 6:29
10. "My Eternal Flame" – 5:08
11. "Troops of Avalon" – 6:09

== Personnel ==
- Dushan Petrossi - all electric and acoustic guitars
- Goetz "Valhalla jr" Mohr - lead and back vocals
- Oliver Hartmann - lead vocals on 4, 8, 9, back vocals
- Richard Andersson - all lead keyboards
- Vassili Moltchanov - bass
- Anton Arkhipov - drums, background keyboards

=== Production ===
- Dushan Petrossi - producer
- Didier Chesneau - mixing
- JC Lemaitre - mixing
- Yvan Galasse - sound engineer
- Oliver Hartmann - vocal recording
- Leo Hao - front cover design
- Eric Phillippe - booklet design, logo
