= Märk hur vår skugga =

Song by the 18th century Swedish bard Carl Michael Bellman

- Art song
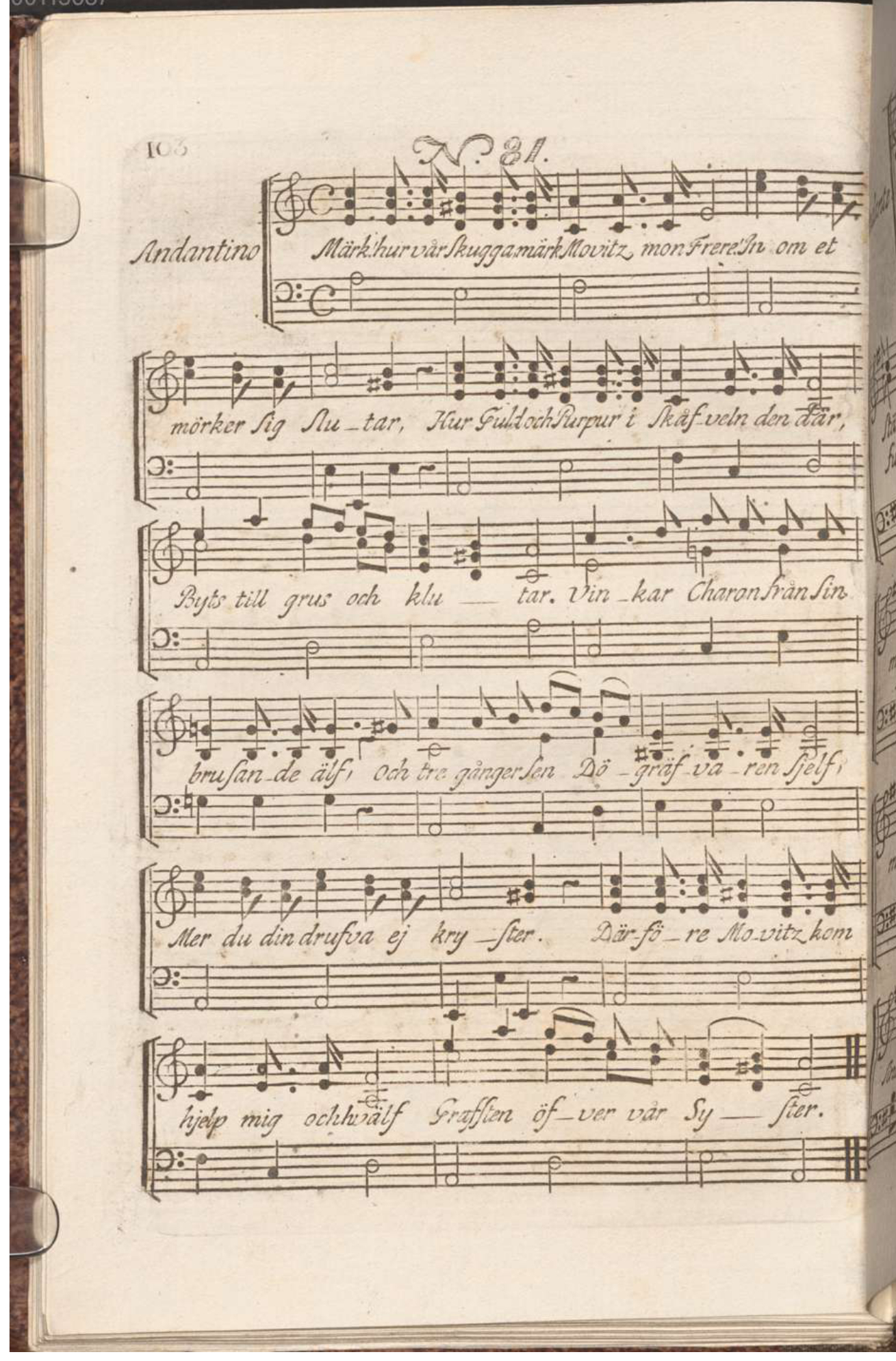
- First page of sheet music for the 1810 edition
- English: Mark how our shadow
- Written: Late 1780s–1790
- Text: poem by Carl Michael Bellman
- Language: Swedish
- Melody: Perhaps by Bellman himself
- Published: 1790 in Fredman's Epistles
- Scoring: voice and cittern

Märk hur vår skugga (Mark how our shadow) is one of the best-known of the 1790 Fredman's Epistles, where it is No. 81. These were written and performed by Carl Michael Bellman, the dominant figure in the Swedish song tradition. Its subject is the funeral of one of Bellman's female acquaintances, Grälmakar Löfberg's wife.

== Context ==
Carl Michael Bellman is a central figure in the Swedish ballad tradition and a powerful influence in Swedish music, known for his 1790 Fredman's Epistles and his 1791 Fredman's Songs. A solo entertainer, he played the cittern, accompanying himself as he performed his songs at the royal court.

Jean Fredman (1712 or 1713–1767) was a real watchmaker of Bellman's Stockholm. The fictional Fredman, alive after 1767, but without employment, is the supposed narrator in Bellman's epistles and songs. The epistles, written and performed in different styles, from drinking songs and laments to pastorales, paint a complex picture of the life of the city during the 18th century. A frequent theme is the demimonde, with Fredman's cheerfully drunk Order of Bacchus, a loose company of ragged men who favour strong drink and prostitutes. At the same time as depicting this realist side of life, Bellman creates a rococo picture, full of classical allusion, following the French post-Baroque poets. The women, including the beautiful Ulla Winblad, are "nymphs", while Neptune's festive troop of followers and sea-creatures sport in Stockholm's waters. The juxtaposition of elegant and low life is humorous, sometimes burlesque, but always graceful and sympathetic. The songs are "most ingeniously" set to their music, which is nearly always borrowed and skilfully adapted.

== Song ==
=== Music and verse form ===
Melody of Epistle 81

The song has four verses, each of 9 lines. The music is in 4/4 time, and is marked Andantino. The melody may be by Bellman himself; a very similar melody was used by Eric Lorentz Zebell, but it was printed after the Epistles. The real Doctor Blad was the Bellman family's doctor, and one of their closest friends, during the latter part of Bellman's life.

=== Lyrics ===
The song was written late in the 1780s or in 1790, not long before publication. Epistle No. 81 is subtitled "Til Grälmakar Löfberg i Sterbhuset vid Danto bommen, diktad vid Grafven" (To Quarrelsome Löfberg in the Hospice by the Danto barrier, dictated at the Grave). The dedication runs "Dedicerad til Doctor BLAD" (Dedicated to Doctor Blad).

Epistle 81, first verse
Carl Michael Bellman, 1790

Märk hur' vår skugga, märk Movitz Mon Frère!
Innom et mörker sig slutar,
Hur Guld och Purpur i Skåfveln, den där,
Byts til grus och klutar.
Vinkar Charon från sin brusande älf,
Och tre gånger sen Dödgräfvaren sjelf,
Mer du din drufva ej kryster.
Därföre Movitz kom hjelp mig och hvälf
Grafsten öfver vår Syster.

Prose translation

Mark how our shadow, mark, Movitz mon frère, (Note: French: "my brother")
within a darkness ends,
How gold and purple in that shovel,
is changed to grit and rags.
Charon waves from his roaring stream,
and three times too the gravedigger waves,
no more your grape will glisten.
So, Movitz, come and help me place
a gravestone over our sister.

Paul Britten Austin, 1977

Mark how our shadow, mark, Movitz mon frère,
One small darkness encloses,
How gold and purple that shovel there
To rags and rubbish disposes.
Charon beckons from tumultuous waves,
Then thrice this ancient digger of graves.
For thee ne'er grapeskin shall glister.
Wherefore, my Movitz, come help me to raise
A gravestone over our sister.

== Reception ==
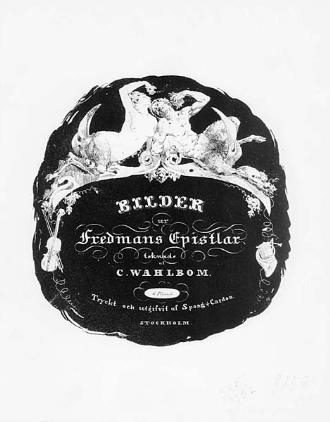
Vignette on title page of "Bilder ur Fredmans Epistlar" by C. Wahlbom

The scholar of literature Lars Lönnroth writes that Bellman often begins with a priestly tone, as he does for this churchyard epistle, before turning from the elegiac to a drinking-orgy, as Fredman and the other guests are unmasked. The language, the genre, the voice, and the roles played all switch over, he observes, from the elevated to a drinking song's slapdash interaction. He writes that this does not mean that the sacred is accorded no value; rather, Bellman directs the "holy light" of attention from the high to the low, valuing both of them.

Students of Swedish literature at the University of Gothenburg are expected to study Fredman's Songs and Epistles, "especially Fredman's epistle nos. 23, 33, and 81."

== Recordings and translations ==
Epistle 81 has been recorded by Fred Åkerström and by Cornelis Vreeswijk. Other versions have been recorded by Stefan Sundström and Imperiet, who scored a 1985-1985 Svensktoppen hit with the song. The English-speaking band Mediaeval Baebes recorded the song in Swedish on their 2005 album Mirabilis. The Swedish folk singer Sofia Karlsson included it in her 2007 album Visor från vinden, alongside works by poets such as Baudelaire and Dan Andersson; it was the only Bellman song in the collection. The Danish metal band Evil Masquerade included the song, in Swedish, in their 2016 album The Outcast Hall of Fame.

A Danish translation was recorded by Nis Bank-Mikkelsen. An English translation, entitled Epistle No. 81, has been recorded by the Swedish doom metal band Candlemass on the 1988 album Ancient Dreams, and by the American doom metal band While Heaven Wept on the 2003 album Of Empires Forlorn. Another English translation, entitled Castrum Doloris, was recorded by the Swedish black metal band Marduk on their 2003 album World Funeral. Vreeswijk translated the epistle to Dutch.

The Bellman biographer Paul Britten Austin made a verse translation in 1977.

== Sources ==
- Bellman, Carl Michael (1790). Fredmans epistlar. Stockholm: By Royal Privilege.
- Britten Austin, Paul (1967). The Life and Songs of Carl Michael Bellman: Genius of the Swedish Rococo. New York: Allhem, Malmö American-Scandinavian Foundation. ISBN 978-3-932759-00-0.
- Britten Austin, Paul (1977). Fredman's Epistles and Songs. Stockholm: Reuter and Reuter. OCLC 5059758.
- Hassler, Göran; Dahl, Peter (illus.) (1989). Bellman – en antologi [Bellman – an anthology]. En bok för alla. ISBN 91-7448-742-6. (contains the most popular Epistles and Songs, in Swedish, with sheet music)
- Kleveland, Åse; Ehrén, Svenolov (illus.) (1984). Fredmans epistlar & sånger [The songs and epistles of Fredman]. Stockholm: Informationsförlaget. ISBN 91-7736-059-1. (with facsimiles of sheet music from first editions in 1790, 1791)
- Lönnroth, Lars (2005). Ljuva karneval! : om Carl Michael Bellmans diktning [Lovely Carnival! : about Carl Michael Bellman's Verse]. Stockholm: Albert Bonniers Förlag. ISBN 978-91-0-057245-7. OCLC 61881374.
- Massengale, James Rhea (1979). The Musical-Poetic Method of Carl Michael Bellman. Stockholm: Almqvist & Wiksell International. ISBN 91-554-0849-4.
