= Third Act =

Studio album by Evil Masquerade
- Released: 21 July 2006
- Genres: Heavy metal, progressive metal
- Label: Dark Minstrel Music
- Producer: Henrik Flyman

Evil Masquerade chronology
Theatrical Madness (2005)	Third Act (2006)	Fade to Black (2009)

Third Act is the third full-length album by the Swedish/Danish band Evil Masquerade, released on 21 July 2006.

== Track listing ==
All songs written by Henrik Flyman.

No.	Title	Length
1.	"The Devil's Last Temptation"	1:19
2.	"Third Act"	5:23
3.	"Black Ravens Cry"	4:50
4.	"Descended From the Grave"	3:57
5.	"Far Away"	3:56
6.	"The Dark Minstrel Plays"	4:49
7.	"I'll Make You Burn"	5:32
8.	"Under the Surface of Water"	3:42
9.	"Orchestration for More Than One Horn"	0:35
10.	"Bring on the World"	5:09
11.	"The Final Goodbye"	5:10
Total length:		44:22

Bonus tracks
No.	Title	Original source	Length
12.	"Limbo" (Japan only)		2:10
13.	"The Wind Will Rise" (North America only)	Welcome to the Show	4:55
14.	"Bozo the Clown" (North America only)	Theatrical Madness	4:37
Total length:			56:04

== Personnel ==
Evil Masquerade

- Henrik Flyman – guitar, vocals, keyboard
- Apollo Papathanasio – lead vocals
- Dennis Buhl – drums
- Thor Jeppesen – bass

Additional performer

- David Rosenthal – keyboard
- Richard Andersson – keyboard

Production

- Written, composed, arranged and produced by Henrik Flyman.
- Recorded by Henrik Flyman at Digital Bitch, drums recorded at Stonelab Studio by Steen Mogensen, David Rosenthal's keyboard at Sonic Adventures Studio by David Rosenthal, Richard Andersson's keyboard recorded at Lipton Studio by Richard Andersson.
- Mixed and mastered by Tommy Hansen at Jailhouse Studios.
- Paintings by Katja Handberg.
- Photos by Thomas Trane.
- Artwork by Gunbarrel Offensive Design.
