= Fade to Black (Evil Masquerade album) =

Studio album by Evil Masquerade
- Released: 26 January 2009
- Genres: Power metal, heavy metal, neoclassical metal
- Length: 45:30
- Label: Escape Music
- Producer: Henrik Flyman

Evil Masquerade chronology
Third Act (2006)	Fade to Black (2009)	Pentagram (2012)

Professional ratings
Review scores
Source	Rating
Dangerdog	4/5
Metal Covenant	8/10
Rock Hard	6/10

Fade to Black is the fourth full-length album by the Swedish/Danish metal band Evil Masquerade, released on 26 January 2009. A music video was made for the song "Desire and Pain".

== Track listing ==
No.	Title	Length
1.	"Lights Out"	5:12
2.	"In a Dungeon Close to Hell"	3:32
3.	"The Darkness Within"	3:52
4.	"Hollow Soul"	3:40
5.	"Different Shades of Black"	3:13
6.	"Powertools"	3:43
7.	"The Ultimate Game"	4:20
8.	"Desire and Pain"	5:22
9.	"Diamond Dust"	3:56
10.	"I Believe in Sin"	7:10
11.	"In My Northern Dreams"	1:30

== Personnel ==
Evil Masquerade

- Apollo Papathanasio – vocals
- Henrik Flyman – guitars, co-lead vocals, additional keyboards
- Johan Niemann – bass
- Tony Carey – keyboards
- Daniel Flores – drums

Production

- Produced and recorded by Henrik Flyman.
- Mixed, and mastered by Tommy Hansen at Jailhouse Studios.
