= Condition Red =

Condition Red may refer to:

- Condition Red (film), a 1995 Finnish-American thriller film
- Condition Red (comics), the name of two different American comic book characters

== Music ==
- Condition Red (Red Rockers album), 1981
- Condition Red (Iron Savior album), 2002
- "Condition Red" (The Goodees song), 1968 one-hit wonder song
- Condition Red (band)
