= Pentagram (Evil Masquerade album) =

Studio album by Evil Masquerade
- Released: 21 May 2012
- Genres: Heavy metal, symphonic metal
- Length: 41:50
- Label: Dark Minstrel Music
- Producer: Henrik Flyman

Evil Masquerade chronology
Fade to Black (2009)	Pentagram (2012)	The Digital Crucifix (2014)

Professional ratings
Review scores
Source	Rating
Metal Shock Finland	10/10
Stormbringer	4/5

Pentagram is the fifth full-length album by the Swedish/Danish metal band Evil Masquerade, released on 21 May 2012. A music video was made for the song "A Silhouette". The album is mentioned to be "dark, heavy and melodic with a rock solid production".

== Track listing ==
No.	Title	Length
1.	"Pentagram"	4:12
2.	"A Silhouette"	3:51
3.	"Perfect Disgrace"	3:24
4.	"The Spirits of the Dead"	4:13
5.	"Moonlight Fantasy"	3:03
6.	"Unholy Water"	3:51
7.	"Pray for Mercy on Our Souls"	3:28
8.	"Soul Taker"	4:36
9.	"On a Bed of Thorns"	4:22
10.	"Strangers Might Fool Ya"	2:10
11.	"When the Fire Dies"	3:32
12.	"The Golden Ratio"	1:08

== Personnel ==
Evil Masquerade

- Apollo Papathanasio – lead vocals
- Henrik Flyman – guitars, co-lead vocals, additional bass and keyboards
- Thor Jeppesen – bass
- Artur Meinild – keyboards
- Dennis Buhl – drums

Production

- Produced and recorded by Henrik Flyman.
- Recorded, mixed, and mastered by Tommy Hansen at Jailhouse Studios.
- Artwork by Yeison Gonzalez Castano.
