= Dreyelands =

Hungarian progressive metal band

- Origin: Budapest, Hungary
- Genres: Progressive metal Melodic metal
- Years active: 2002–present
- Members: Omar Gassama - drums Gergely Springer - bass Nikola Mijic - lead vocals Andras Adam Horvath - guitar Zsolt Kovago - keyboards
- Website: dreyelands.com

Dreyelands is a Hungarian progressive metal band formed in 2002. They won the 'Debut Album of the Year' of Hang-Súly - Hungarian Metal Awards in 2010.

== History ==
Dreyelands was founded by Andras Adam Horvath and Gergely Springer in 2002. Later they were joined by Peter Ilovszky (guitar, Jozsef Nyeste (lead vocals) and Omar Gassama (drums). The band's first lineup was completed by Zoltan Kas (keyboards).

In this early period they were playing rock and metal covers, e.g. from Dream Theater, while starting to develop their own sound. After a demo in 2003, the band recorded its first EP, Can't Hide Away, which aired on MTV Headbangers Ball. In 2008 the band recorded its first studio album, mixed and mastered by Barnabas Hidasi.

In 2009 the band was signed by Finnish metal label Lion Music, which released the band's debut concept album, Rooms of Revelation in 2010.

In 2010 Dreyelands won the 'Debut Album of the Year' of Hang-Súly - Hungarian Metal Awards.

The band was featured on Lion Music's project Embrace The Sun with a previously unreleased song, "Life is Worth the Pain". This double compilation album was a charity for the victims of the Japanese Tsunami in 2011.

Dreyelands opened for Queensrÿche, Fates Warning, Adrenaline Mob and Leprous.

Dreyelands recorded their second album "Stages", to be released without a label on the May 24, 2018.

== Members ==
- Nikola Mijic – lead vocals
- Andras Adam Horvath – guitar
- Zsolt Kovago – keyboards
- Gergely Springer – bass guitar
- Omar Gassama – drums

== Former members ==
- Peter Ilovszky – guitar (2002-2004)
- Krisztian Halasz – keyboards (2002-2003)
- Zalan Kiss - guitar (2004-2005)
- Zoltan "Kazo" Kas – keyboards (2004-2009)
- Jozsef Nyeste – lead vocals (2004)
- Gyorgy Nagy – keyboards (session, 2010-2013)

== Discography ==
- Can't Hide Away (2006) - EP
- Rooms of Revelation (2010)
- Stages (2018)
