= God Has a Plan for Us All =

Album by Angtoria

Studio album by Angtoria
- Released: April 27, 2006
- Recorded: November 2005 – January 2006
- Genre: Symphonic metal
- Length: 49:07
- Label: Listenable Records
- Producers: Chris Rehn; Tommy Rehn

Professional ratings
Review scores
Source	Rating
Allmusic	link

God Has a Plan for Us All is the first full-length album by Angtoria, released on 27 April, 2006. It was received well by the international media and the special edition of the album sold-out soon after its release date (it was limited to 3,000 copies worldwide). The band recorded a video for the title track. Lyrical themes deal mostly with child abuse, self-harm and abuse in general. The lyrics for the album are very personal. According to Sarah Jezebel Deva, "the title refers to that despite what happens, religious people always back themselves up with: 'God has a plan for us all' and 'It is as He wills it.' "

== Track listing ==
- All Songs Arranged By Sarah Jezebel Deva, Chris Rehn & Tommy Rehn.
1. The Awakening (1:31) (Deva, T. Rehn)
2. I'm Calling (4:57) (Deva, T. Rehn, C. Rehn)
3. God Has a Plan for Us All (4:33) (Deva, T. Rehn, C. Rehn)
4. Suicide On My Mind (3:51) (Deva, C. Rehn)
5. Deity of Disgust (5:00) (with Martin Häggström of ZooL) (Deva, T. Rehn, C. Rehn)
6. The Addiction (3:27) (Deva, C. Rehn)
7. Six Feet Under's Not Deep Enough (4:15) (Deva, C. Rehn)
8. Do You See Me Now (4:25) (Deva, C. Rehn)
9. Original Sin (3:39) (with Aaron Stainthorpe of My Dying Bride) (Deva, T. Rehn, C. Rehn, Stainthorpe)
10. Hell Hath No Fury Like a Woman Scorned (4:43) (Deva, C. Rehn)
11. Confide in Me (Kylie Minogue cover) (4:14) (Steve Anderson, David Seaman)
12. That's What the Wise Lady Said (4:31) (Deva, C. Rehn)
13. A Child That Walks in the Path of a Man (Limited Edition Bonus Track)

== Production ==
- Produced By Chris & Tommy Rehn
- Engineers: Chris & Tommy Rehn, Micke Ohlen, Mark Harwood (Vocals & Bass), Daniel Bergstrand (Drums)
- Mixing: Daniel Bergstrand, Micke Ohlen, Chris Rehn, Tommy Rehn
- Vocal Editing: Eric S.
- Mastering: Bjorn Engelmann

== Personnel ==
- Sarah Jezebel Deva: Female Vocals
- Aaron Stainthorpe: Male Vocal on "Original Sin"
- Tony Konberg: Additional Male Vocals
- Chris Rehn: Acoustic & Electric Guitars, Keyboards, Bass, Programming
- Tommy Rehn: Acoustic & Electric Guitars, Keyboards, Bass, Programming
- Richard Anderson: Keyboards
- Dave Pybus: Bass
- Andreas Brobjer: Drums, Percussion
