= Evil Masquerade =

Scandinavian band

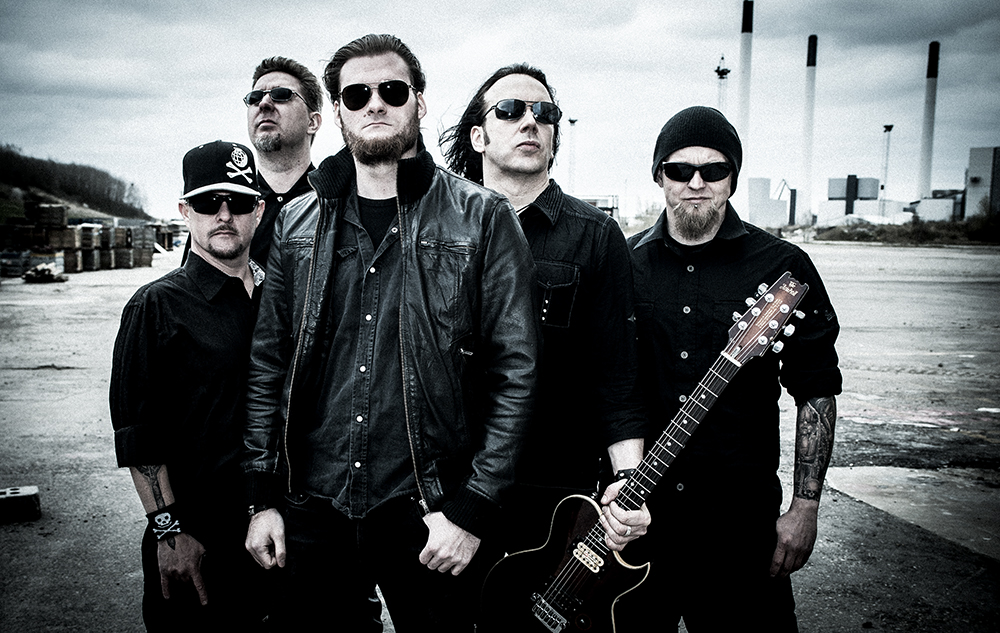

Background information
- Origin: Sweden, Denmark
- Genre: Heavy metal
- Years active: 2003–present
- Label: Dark Minstrel Music
- Members: Henrik Flyman; Nicklas Sonne; Dennis Buhl; Thor Jeppesen; Artur Meinild
- Website: evilmasquerade.com

Evil Masquerade is a Scandinavian band formed in 2003. Their wide range of musical influences make them difficult to categorize. Evil Masquerade themselves claim to be playing 'Devilish Rock'n'Roll'. But since that is a self-invented genre they are usually filed under heavy metal by the music industry.

== History ==
Evil Masquerade was founded 2003 in Copenhagen by Swedish guitarist Henrik Flyman (Lacrimosa, ex-Wuthering Heights, ex-Moahni Moahna, ex-ZooL). Together with drummer Dennis Buhl (ex-Hatesphere), bass player Kasper Gram and vocalist Henrik Brockmann (ex-Royal Hunt) they set off to record the band's debut album that was released early 2004 under the name Welcome to the Show. It almost immediately received worldwide recognition and made the charts in Japan at # 8. One year later it was followed up with their second album Theatrical Madness.

A couple of line up changes took place and new singer Apollo Papathanasio (Spiritual Beggars, ex-Firewind, ex-Time Requiem) and bass player Thor Jeppesen entered the studio with Flyman and Buhl to record the album Third Act. This album took the band to a new level of fame when it was re-released in 2007 in the US, one year after the original release in Europe and Asia. The fourth studio album Fade To Black saw yet another change in the line-up with only Henrik Flyman and Apollo Papathanasio remaining from the previous album. New members were drummer Daniel Flores (The Murder of My Sweet, Mind's Eye, Tears of Anger, ZooL) and bass player Johan Niemann (Therion, Evergrey, Hubi Meisel, Demonoid, Mind's Eye).

Flyman spent 2010 composing songs for the band's fifth album Pentagram that was released in May 2012. The recordings took place during 2011 and involved Flyman once again teaming up with the same members as on the band's third release: Papathanasio, Buhl and Jeppesen; together with the latest addition to the line-up, the band's first permanent keyboard player, Artur Meinild.

In 2013 it was announced that Papathanasio was no longer in the band and that he had been replaced by Tobias Jansson from Sweden. Tobias' first and only recording with Evil Masquerade was their sixth studio album, The Digital Crucifix, which was released worldwide on 22 April 2014 by Dark Minstrel Music. Evil Masquerade did not immediately introduce a new singer after parting ways with Jansson. Instead they chose to record their seventh studio album The Outcast Hall of Fame with 5 vocalists (Mats Levén, Rick Altzi, Apollo Papathanasio, Nicklas Sonne and Henrik Flyman). Included on the album is a revised version of the song Märk hur vår skugga by the Swedish poet, songwriter, composer Carl Michael Bellman (4 February 1740 – 11 February 1795). The album was released worldwide by Dark Minstrel Music on 19 May 2016. Shortly after the release Sonne was announced as the band's live vocalist and one month later he became a permanent part of the lineup.

== Awards ==
In 2009 Henrik Flyman and Evil Masquerade won the JPF Music Awards (USA) in the category Best Metal Song with "Bozo the Clown".

== Charity ==
During 2011 Henrik Flyman got involved with "Metal for Cancer", a charity organization founded by Richard Ofsoski to raise funds for the Australian Cancer Research Foundation. Flyman wrote the song "Let's Unite in Rock" that was performed by various artists under the name The MFC Dragon Slayer All Star Project. This band included all members from Evil Masquerade (except for Dennis Buhl) as well as Richard Ofsoski, Mats Levén (Therion, Yngwie Malmsteen), Peter Wildoer (James LaBrie, Darkane, ex-Time Requiem), Snowy Shaw (Therion, Mercyful Fate, Dream Evil), Tony Kakko (Sonata Arctica), Glen Drover (Megadeth, King Diamond) and Tony Mills (TNT, Shy) just to name a few.

== Members ==
- Henrik Flyman - guitar (2003–present)
- Nicklas Sonne - vocals (2016–present)
- Thor Jeppesen - bass (2005–2008, 2010–present)
- Artur Meinild - keyboard (2011–present)

=== Former members ===
- Apollo Papathanasio - vocals (2005–2013)
- Daniel Flores - drums (2008–2010)
- Johan Niemann - bass (2008–2010)
- Tobias Jansson - vocals (2013–2014)
- Kasper Gram - bass (2003–2005)
- Henrik Brockmann - vocals (2003–2005)
- Dennis Buhl - drums (2003–2008, 2010–2016)

=== Guests ===
- Tony Carey - keyboard (2008)
- David Rosenthal - keyboard (2006)
- Mats Olausson - keyboard (2004)
- Richard Andersson - keyboard (2004–2007)
- André Andersen - keyboard (2004–2005)
- Yenz Leonhardt - backing vocals (2016)
- Mats Levén - vocals (2016)
- Rick Altzi - vocals (2016)

== Discography ==
=== Studio albums ===
- Welcome to the Show (2004)
- Theatrical Madness (2005)
- Third Act (2006)
- Fade to Black (2009)
- Pentagram (2012)
- The Digital Crucifix (2014)
- The Outcast Hall of Fame (2016)

=== Compilation ===
- 10 Years in the Dark (2014)

=== Singles/videos ===
- "Black Ravens Cry" (2007)
- "Desire and Pain" (2009)
- "A Silhouette" (2012)
- "Like Voodoo" (2014)
- "Lost Inside a World of Fear" (2016)
- "Märk Hur Vår Skugga" (2016)
