= Flickan och kråkan =

Song by Mikael Wiehe

from the album Kråksånger
- Language: Swedish
- Released: 1981
- Genre: Progg
- Length: 3:46
- Songwriter: Mikael Wiehe

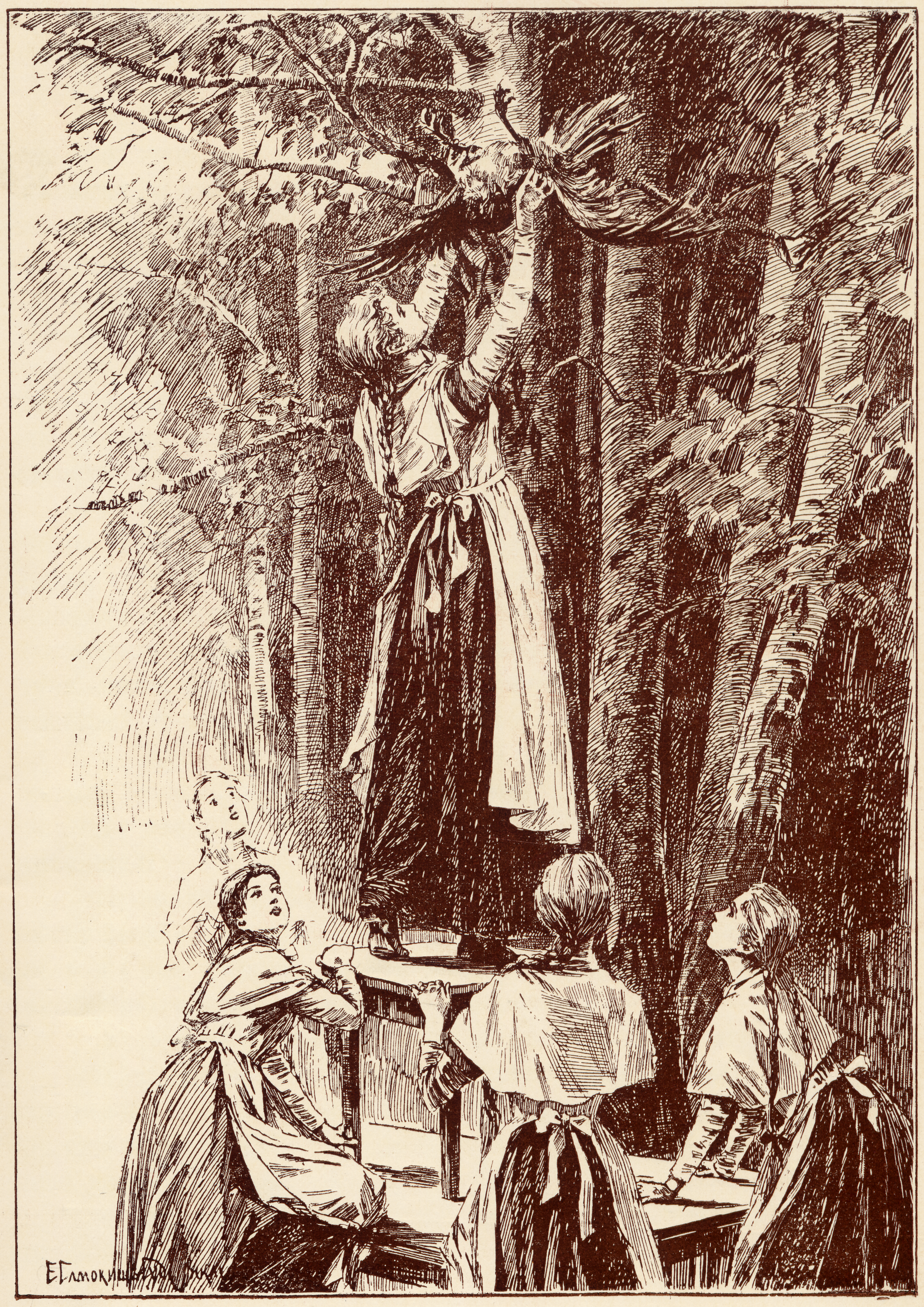
Girls rescuing a crow, by Nadezhda Aleksandrovna Lukhmanova

The Girl and the Crow (in Swedish: Flickan och kråkan) is a song composed by Mikael Wiehe, originally published on his album "Kråksånger" in 1981.

Wiehe wrote the text inspired by an image by the Swedish cartoonist Oscar Cleve: Little girl rushes to vet with wounded crow".

Several covers have been made including versions by Dia Psalma (1994), Strömkarlen (2009), and Timbuktu (2012). According to Wiehe, Anni-Frid Lyngstad from ABBA wanted to release a cover in the beginning of the 1980s to one of her albums, but he declined, one of the major reasons being that she earlier had appeared in a Swedish Employers Association advertising campaign, "Invest in yourself". It was included in Sofia Karlsson's successful 2007 studio album Visor från vinden, which also featured songs by the poets Charles Baudelaire, Inger Hagerup and Dan Andersson.

== Charts ==
=== Timbuktu version ===
==== Weekly charts ====
Chart (2011–2012)	Peak position
Sweden (Sverigetopplistan)	7

==== Year-end charts ====
Chart (2012)	Position
Sweden (Sverigetopplistan)	28
