= Vast Oceans Lachrymose =

Studio album by While Heaven Wept
- Released: November 2009
- Genre: Doom metal
- Label: Cruz Del Sur
- Producer: Tom Phillips and Chris Salamone

While Heaven Wept chronology
Of Empires Forlorn (2003)	Vast Oceans Lachrymose (2009)

Vast Oceans Lachrymose is the third full-length studio album by While Heaven Wept, and their first to feature lead vocalist Rain Irving. Released in November 2009 by Italian label Cruz Del Sur, most of the material was ready in 2005 but was delayed by line up changes and label trouble. Previous record label Rage of Achilles Records went out of business and Black Lotus Records (their next label) filed for bankruptcy. The album cover features the painting Christ Stilleth the Tempest by John Martin.

The album was rated 4 out of 5 stars by AllMusic.

== Track listing ==
1. "The Furthest Shore" – 15:50
2. "To Wander the Void" – 6:27
3. "Living Sepulchre" – 4:00
4. "Vessel" – 7:47
5. "Vast Oceans Lachrymose" – 5:01
6. "Epilogue" – 3:12

== Credits ==
- Tom Phillips – guitars, keyboards, harmony vocals
- Rain Irving – lead and harmony vocals
- Jim Hunter – bass
- Scott Loose – guitars
- Trevor Schrotz – drums
- Michelle Schrotz – keyboards and harmony vocals
