= Theatrical Madness =

Studio album by Evil Masquerade
- Released: 2005
- Genre: Heavy Metal
- Length: 45:34
- Label: Dark Minstrel Music, Marquee/Avalon
- Producer: Henrik Flyman

Evil Masquerade chronology
Welcome to the Show (2004)	Theatrical Madness (2005)	Third Act (2006)

Professional ratings
Review scores
Source	Rating
Les Acteurs De L'ombre	9/10 link
Metal Rules	5/5 link
HeavyMusic.Ru	9.5/10 link
Powermetal.dk	92/100 link
Heavy Law	10/10 link
SkipMag	9/10 link
Metal Universe	9/10 link
Obskure	91/100 link
Concrete Web	92/100 link
Musikrecension.se	5/5 link

Theatrical Madness is the second full-length album by the Danish band Evil Masquerade.

== Track listing ==
1. When Satan Calls – 3:53
2. Theatrical Madness – 5:11
3. Bozo the Clown – 4:38
4. Now When Our Stars Are Fading – 6:32
5. A Great Day To Die – 4:21
6. Demolition Army – 4:08
7. Snow White – 1:44
8. Witches Chant – 4:16
9. Other Ways To Babylon – 5:06
10. The Dark Play – 5:11
11. Outro – 0:34

The Japanese version of the album contains the bonus track Yes Sir, I Can Boogie (originally released 1977 by Spanish female disco duo Baccara).

== Personnel ==
- Henrik Flyman – guitar, vocals
- Henrik Brockmann – lead vocals
- Dennis Buhl – drums
- Kasper Gram – bass guitar

=== Guest musicians ===
- André Andersen – keyboard
- Richard Andersson – keyboard
- Mikkel Jensen – keyboard
- Not Just Any Choir – choir
- Katja Handberg – female choir
- Sanna Thor – female choir
- Juruda Bendtsen – female choir
- Monika Pedersen – vocals
- Tommy Hansen – Moog and bongo

=== Production ===
- Written, composed, arranged and produced by Henrik Flyman, lyrics for "Snow White" by Katja Handberg/Henrik Flyman, lyrics for "Witches Chant" by William Shakespeare/Henrik Flyman.
- Recorded by Henrik Flyman at Digital Bitch, drums recorded by Tommy Hansen at Jailhouse Studios.
- Mixed and mastered by Tommy Hansen at Jailhouse Studios.
- Paintings by Katja Handberg
- Photos by Thomas Trane
- Artwork by Gunbarrel Offensive Design
- Originally released by Marquee/Avalon. Re-released by Dark Minstrel Music
