= The Digital Crucifix =

Studio album by Evil Masquerade
- Released: 22 April 2014
- Studios: Digital Bitch; Media Sound
- Genre: Heavy metal
- Length: 39:48
- Label: Dark Minstrel Music
- Producer: Henrik Flyman

Evil Masquerade chronology
Pentagram (2012)	The Digital Crucifix (2014)	The Outcast Hall of Fame (2016)

Professional ratings
Review scores
Source	Rating
Dangerdog	5/5
Metal Temple	8/10

The Digital Crucifix is the sixth full-length album by the Swedish/Danish metal band Evil Masquerade, released on 22 April 2014. It was mixed by Tommy Hansen, known for his production work with Helloween, Pretty Maids, and Jorn. It is their only album with vocalist Tobias Jansson, replacing their previous vocalist Apollo Papathanasio.

== Track listing ==
No.	Title	Length
1.	"Like Voodoo"	3:19
2.	"Buying Salvation"	3:58
3.	"The Extra Mile"	2:24
4.	"The Shame"	3:49
5.	"The Nature Is Calling"	5:28
6.	"Bad News"	2:51
7.	"The Hangover"	1:28
8.	"Anywhere the Wind Blows"	4:05
9.	"Lady of the Night"	3:22
10.	"Gasoline & Ice-Cold Gin"	2:44
11.	"Sign of the Times"	6:20

== Personnel ==
Evil Masquerade

- Tobias Jansson – lead vocals
- Henrik Flyman – guitars, co-lead vocals
- Thor Jeppesen – bass
- Artur Meinild – keyboards
- Dennis Buhl – drums

Additional performers

- Andreas Tophøj – violin (tracks 1, 2, and 8)
- Lotte Ørtoft – cello (track 8)
- Mickey Fensmark Holm – clarinet (track 3)
- Hans-Christian Haunsvig – trumpet (tracks 3 and 11)

Production

- Produced and recorded by Henrik Flyman.
- Drum recording by Peter Brander and Anders Overgaard.
- Mixed and mastered by Tommy Hansen at Jailhouse Studios.
- Artwork by David Troest.
- Photos by Thomas Trane.
