= Shadow of the Red Baron =

Studio album by Iron Mask
- Released: December 16, 2009
- Recorded: 2009
- Genre: Neo-classical metal Power metal
- Length: 55:16
- Label: Marquee/Avalon, Lion Music
- Producer: Dushan Petrossi

Iron Mask chronology
Hordes of the Brave (2005)	Shadow of the Red Baron (2009)	Black as Death (2011)

Shadow of the Red Baron is the third studio album by Belgian band Iron Mask, released on December 16, 2009 by Lion Music. All songs were composed by Dushan Petrossi.

== Track listing ==
1. "Shadow of the Red Baron" – 07:04
2. "Dreams" – 4:32
3. "Forever in the Dark" – 5:11
4. "Resurrection" – 5:07
5. "Sahara" – 4:21
6. "Black Devil Ship" – 4:31
7. "We Will Meet Again" – 4:33
8. "Universe" – 4:51
9. "My Angel Is Gone" – 4:16
10. "Only the Good Die Young" – 3:56
11. "Ghost of the Tzar" – 6:54

== Personnel ==
- Dushan Petrossi - all guitars
- Goetz "Valhalla jr" Mohr - lead vocals
- Roma Siadletski - extreme vocals
- Oliver Hartmann - lead vocals on 2, backing vocals
- Andreas Lindahl - keyboards
- Vassili Moltchanov - bass
- Erik Stout - drums
- Lars Eric Mattsson - guitar solo on 5

=== Production ===
- Production - Dushan Petrossi
- Mix & mastering - Jens Bogren at Fascination Street Studios, Sweden
- Guitars, bass, orchestral parts recorded - The Iron Kingdom Studio, Brussels, Belgium
- Drums recorded - Het Paand Studio, Rotterdam, Holland
- Keyboards recorded - Andreas Lindahl, Sweden
- Vocals recorded - Oliver Hartmann at Alive Studio, Germany
- Front cover, booklet design - Eric Phillippe
