= Moahni Moahna =

Swedish band

- Genres: Heavy metal, hard rock
- Years active: 1992 - 1997
- Members: Henrik Flyman; Tommy Rehn; Martin Häggström
- Website: Moahni Moahna

Moahni Moahna is a Swedish band that was created in the early 1990s by guitarist Henrik Flyman (Evil Masquerade, Lacrimosa, Wuthering Heights, ZooL) and guitarist Tommy Rehn. They wrote and performed their own brand of hard rock/heavy metal that was described as "Fantasy Metal". The band started as a two-piece formation with hired session musicians, but they soon added vocalist Martin Häggström as a steady member.

== Discography ==
Studio albums

- Temple of Life (1994)
- Why (1996)

Singles & EPs

- Face the Light (1992)
- Queen Shamar (1994)

== Videography ==
- Radio's to Blame (1997)

== Band members ==
- Henrik Flyman – guitars, bass, keyboard
- Tommy Rehn – guitars, bass, keyboard
- Martin Häggström – vocals

Various session musicians have collaborated with the band.

== History ==
A Moahni Moahna memorial website is available where more material can be found (such as biography and photos).

The band has not been heard from since 1997 when they gave their last live performance as support to Deep Purple in Sweden. No official statement has been made about ending Moahni Moahna.

Henrik Flyman is now active in Evil Masquerade. Tommy Rehn was a member of symphonic metal band Angtoria.
