= Condition Red (band) =

Condition Red was a Finnish progressive rock and metal project, notably releasing two albums on Lion Music.

== Inception ==
The initiative to the project was taken Lars Eric Mattsson from Åland, Finland, who also released Condition Red's albums on the Lion Music label which he owned. He brought in several guest musicians, with critics noting the presence of Derek Sherinian on keyboards. Furthermore, singer Torgny Stjärnfelt and Esa Pietilä appeared on the first album Condition Red (2000). Ella Grüssner did vocals and violin, Alex Masi guitars and Alexander King keyboards. Eddie Sledgehammer was the drummer on the first album, passing the stick to Gerald Kloos for the recording of Condition Red II (2003).

== Reception ==
DPRP gave a 5 out of 10 score to the first album and 6.5 to the second album. Both reviewers criticized the vocals, the first calling the performance "quite bad, more yelling than singing" and the later reviewer finding the vocals too inconsistent. The solo performances and songwriting did not impress the reviewers either.

Rock Hard gave a 5 to Condition Red too, whereas Scream Magazine agreed that the vocals and songwriting were a major drawback on Condition Red II, concluding that the album was mediocre fare with 3 out of 6 points.

Metal.de bestowed 7 points on Condition Red II, among others praising Grüssner: "Their singer is what gives Condition Red their distinctive character; it's a shame they didn't utilize her more consistently". Furthermore, the musicians "all operate at an extremely high level" technically. Powermetal.de had a positive outlook on the complex music on Condition Red, with its "difficult-to-grasp song structures, musical styles that defy categorization, and harmonic and rhythmic intricacies that would leave even the most seasoned musicians scratching their heads". However, Condition Red II left Powermetal's reviewer "a little disappointed". He speculated that the album was made up of tracks that had been cut from the debut, calling most of the songs "completely uninspired, lacking even a hint of successful songwriting and simply lacking juice and power".

Condition Red also contributed to Lion Music's Blackmore Castle, a tribute album to Deep Purple and Rainbow. The track was "Black Night", described as having "something new and interesting" about it. After many years, Condition Red released their third album Illusion Of Truth in 2016.

== External link ==
- Discogs

=== Further reading ===
- Review of Condition Red by Rough Edge
- Review of Condition Red II by Metalfan.nl (in Dutch)
- Review of Condition Red II by Rough Edge
- Review of Condition Red II by Disagreement
- Review of Illusion of Truth by Get Ready to Rock!
- Review of Illusion of Truth by Rock Out Stand Out
