= Richard Andersson =

- Born: 28 March 1972 (age 54)
- Origin: Ystad, Sweden
- Genre: Neoclassical metal
- Occupations: Musician, songwriter
- Instruments: Keyboards, synthesizers
- Website: anderssonmusic.com

Richard Andersson (born 28 March 1972) is a Swedish musician and the founder of several neoclassical metal bands in Sweden including Majestic and Time Requiem.

== Biography ==
As a kid, Andersson taught himself how to play the keyboard. At the age of seven, he was already able to play a lot of work from Mozart and other classical music icons. In the 20 years that followed, he developed an own style that was a mix between classical music and heavy metal. He found himself more and more often writing songs as well.

In 1998 he created his first project Majestic and the first album was released in 1999, called Abstract Symphony. In 2000, Trinity Overture followed. The band also did a tour in Japan and was the support act of bands like the Pretty Maids and Symphony X. He played keyboards for the French progressive metal band Adagio on their debut album Sanctus Ignis in 2002, recording solo sections.

When – according to himself – Andersson was unable to continue to work with his businesspartners, he stopped with the Majestic-project. Together with some of the former bandmembers from Majestic, a new band was formed called Time Requiem. The album that wore the name Time Requiem was released in 2002. So far, this band has released three albums.

Next to Time Requiem, Andersson also decided to start a new band with old friend Magnus Nilsson. Andersson and Nilsson grew up together and share a lot of musical influences.

Now Andersson has gathered a lot of fans and status, he decided that it would be time to release a Best of so far-CD, that wears the title The Ultimate Andersson Collection CD. He felt the production was a little bit weak on some of the albums, so all the songs have been rerecorded. Göran Edman (ex-Yngwie Malmsteen, ex-John Norum) does the vocals.

== Personal life ==
He is the father of child singer Elias Andersson who took part in Talang 2007, the inaugural season of Swedish Got Talent series under the stage name "Skånske Elias". His son reached the top 8 finals stage of the competition, but did not win the title.

== Discography ==
=== Majestic ===
- Abstract Symphony (1999)
- Trinity Overture (2000)

=== Time Requiem ===
- Time Requiem (2002)
- Unleashed in Japan (live album) (2004)
- The Inner Circle of Reality (2004)
- Optical Illusion (2006)

=== Space Odyssey ===
- Embrace the Galaxy (2003)
- The Astral Episode (2005)
- Tears of the Sun (2006)

=== Richard Andersson ===
- The Ultimate Andersson Collection (2005)

=== Guest appearances ===
- Mansson – Arch of Decadence (1999)
- Adagio – Sanctus Ignis (2001)
- Midnight Sun – Metalmachine (2001)
- ZooL – ZooL (2002)
- Silver Seraph – Silver Seraph (2002)
- Karmakanic – Entering the Spectra (2002)
- Evil Masquerade – Welcome to the Show (2004)
- Karmakanic – Wheel of Life (2004)
- Iron Mask – Hordes of the Brave (2005)
- Evil Masquerade – Theatrical Madness (2005)
- Evil Masquerade – Third Act (2006)
- Angtoria – God Has a Plan for Us All (2006)
- Expedition Delta – Expedition Delta (2008)
