= Visor från vinden =

Studio album by Sofia Karlsson
- Released: 11 April 2007
- Genre: Folk music
- Length: 53:54
- Language: Swedish
- Label: Bonnier Amigo Music Group
- Producer: Göran Petersson, Sofia Karlsson, Jan Borges

Sofia Karlsson chronology
Svarta ballader (2005)	Visor från vinden (2007)	Söder om kärleken (2009)

Visor från vinden (Songs from the loft) is the Swedish singer Sofia Karlsson's third studio album as a solo artist. The album was released on 11 April 2007 by Bonnier Amigo Music Group.

The album is a collection of songs written by poets and musicians from the 18th, 19th, and 20th centuries, including the Swedish Dan Andersson, Marianne Flodin, Mikael Wiehe, Alf Hambe, Carl Michael Bellman, Peps Persson, and Evert Taube. The album contains two poems from Charles Baudelaire, and a version of Boris Vian's antiwar song "Le Déserteur", all three originally French. Two of the songs are translations of Norwegian folk songs.

Visor från vinden was recorded at six different times in different places in Sweden and Denmark. The producers were Göran Petersson, Sofia Karlsson and Jan Borges, and among the participating musicians were Esbjörn Hazelius, Roger Tallroth and Lena Willemark.

The album had a mixed to positive reception, with reviewers commenting on the quality of the performances of traditional songs, interpreted plainly but personally. Visor från vinden reached second place on the Swedish album chart, Karlsson's highest placement. In 2008, she received a Swedish Grammis, a Danish Music Award in the category "Best Foreign Album", and the Manifestgalan Prize in the folk music category.

== Background ==
Visor från vinden followed Karlsson's 2005 hit Svarta ballader (Black Ballads, from a 1917 book of poems by the Swedish proletarian school author Dan Andersson) which sold 60,000 copies. Karlsson said that after Svarta ballader she had not planned to make a new album for five years. During the tour that followed the album she and her band began to incorporate more and more songs in the repertoire, so many that she finally had enough for a new album. The songs Karlsson chose to include were among her band's favourites that they had been playing on the tour bus.

== Production ==
Visor från vinden was recorded on six different occasions. "Balladen om briggen "Blue Bird" av Hull" and "Två tungor" were recorded live at Tønder Gymnasium in Tønder, Denmark on 28 August 2006. Jan Borges was producer and Torben Laursen the recording engineer. The songs were recorded for Radio Denmark. The second session was in September 2006, for "Milrök", at Toftaholms manor. The song was recorded by Mats Andersson. The third recording session was in December 2006 and January 2007 in Atlantis Studios, recording "Le Vin Des Amants", "Frukostrast på en liten syfabrik på landet", "Flickan och kråkan", "Spelar för livet", "Jag står här på ett torg", "Resan till Österlandet", "Märk hur vår skugga" and "Moesta et Errabunda". The songs were recorded by Janne Hansson. The fourth and fifth sessions took place in February 2007. "Näckaspel" and "Jag längtar" were recorded by Esbjörn Hazelius in Niglahol Studios, and "Valsen till mig" in Studio Atlantis by Olle Linder. The sixth and last session was in March 2007, for "Hemlängtan", recorded by Olle Linder at Studio Epidemin.

The album was mixed in three months in three different places: in the Atlantis studio 1 and 2 by Janne Hansson, Mikael Herrström, Pontus Olsson, Göran Peterson, Sofia Karlsson and Esbjörn Hazelius; in Fantasifoster Studios by Olle Linder; and in CPR Recording by Claes Persson, who also mastered the album.

== Tracks ==
The album begins and ends (apart from the bonus track "Andra sidan") with poems translated from the French Charles Baudelaire. One other track is also a translation of a French song: Boris Vian's antiwar ballad "Le Déserteur". Most of the rest are Swedish songs, though two are translated from Norwegian. The album is a mix of poems and songs from the 18th, 19th, and 20th centuries.

Tracks
#	Title	Translation of title	Length	Music	Text	Translator	Notes
1	"Le Vin Des Amants"	The wine of lovers	3:44	Sofie Livebrant	Charles Baudelaire	Dan Andersson, as "De älskandes vin"	From the French 1857 poetry collection Les Fleurs du mal ("The Flowers of Evil").
2	"Milrök"	Miles of smoke	2:39	Sofie Livebrant	Dan Andersson	—	Available from Project Runeberg.
3	"Frukostrast på en liten syfabrik på landet"	Breakfast Break in a small sewing factory in the country	3:44	Sofie Livebrant	Marianne Flodin	—	Written in the 1950s
4	"Flickan och kråkan"	The girl and the crow	3:15	Mikael Wiehe	Mikael Wiehe	—	First released on the 1981 studio album Kråksånger. In leadup to the album's release, Karlsson described the song as a sad, but fantastic story that she had not sung since she was a teenager.
5	"Näckaspel"	Nixie play	2:59	Alf Hambe	Alf Hambe	—	First released on Hambe's 1966 album Vägvisor och vågspel.
6	"Spelar för livet"	Playing for life	3:12	Peps Persson	Peps Persson	—	First released on Persson's 1992 album Spelar för livet
7	"Jag längtar"	I'm longing	2:03	Sofia Karlsson	Traditional	Sofia Karlsson, Esmeralda Moberg	From Norwegian.
8	"Balladen om briggen 'Blue Bird' av Hull"	The ballad of the brig 'Blue Bird' from Hull	5:19	Evert Taube	Evert Taube	—	First published in the 1929 Fritiof Anderssons visbok. Karlsson was for a long time undecided about including the song.
9	"Två tungor"	Two tongues	2:33	Finn Kalvik	Inger Hagerup	Fred Åkerström	From Norwegian. Appeared on Åkerström's 1972 album Två tungor.
10	"Jag står här på ett torg"	I'm standing in a square	5:00	Boris Vian, Hal Berg	Boris Vian, Hal Berg	Lars Forssell	A version of a 1954 French antiwar song, "Le Déserteur"
11	"Hemlängtan"	Homesickness	3:43	Gunnar Turesson	Dan Andersson	—	From Dan Andersson's 1915 poetry collection Kolvaktarens visor
12	"Resan till Österlandet"	Journey to the East	2:49	Traditional	Traditional, Sofia Karlsson	—	Verse 2 added by Karlsson; performed a cappella
13	"Valsen till mig"	Waltz me	2:44	Esbjörn Hazelius	(none)	—	Instrumental
14	"Märk hur vår skugga"	Mark how our shadow	4:51	Carl Michael Bellman	Carl Michael Bellman	—	Fredmans epistel no 81; published in 1790
15	"Moesta et Errabunda"	Sad and wandering	4:42	Sofie Livebrant	Charles Baudelaire	Dan Andersson	From the French 1857 poetry collection Les Fleurs du mal ("The Flowers of Evil").
[16]	"Andra sidan"	The other side	2:43				bonus track, live

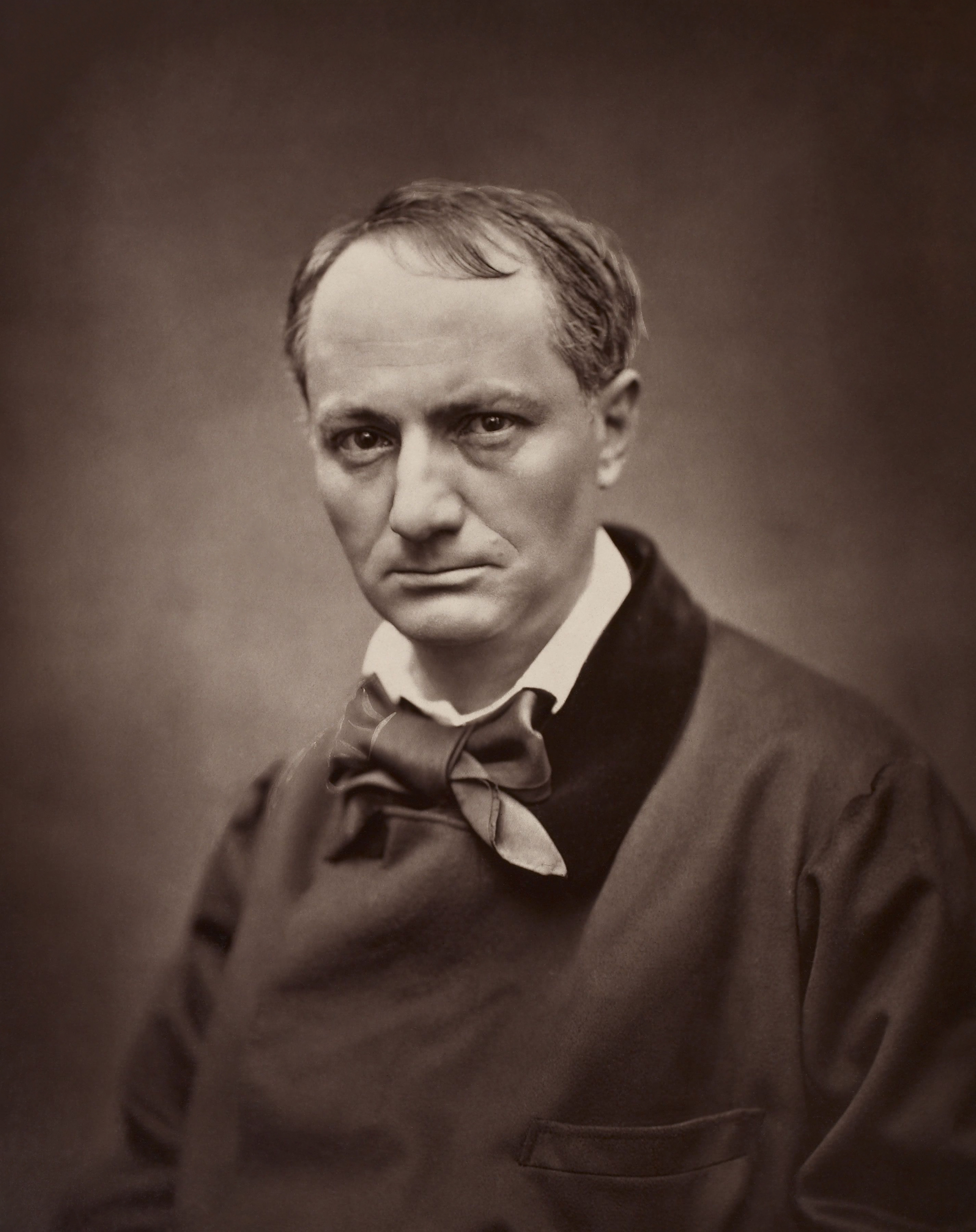
Charles Baudelaire wrote "Le Vin des Amants" and "Moesta et Errabunda" in 1857.

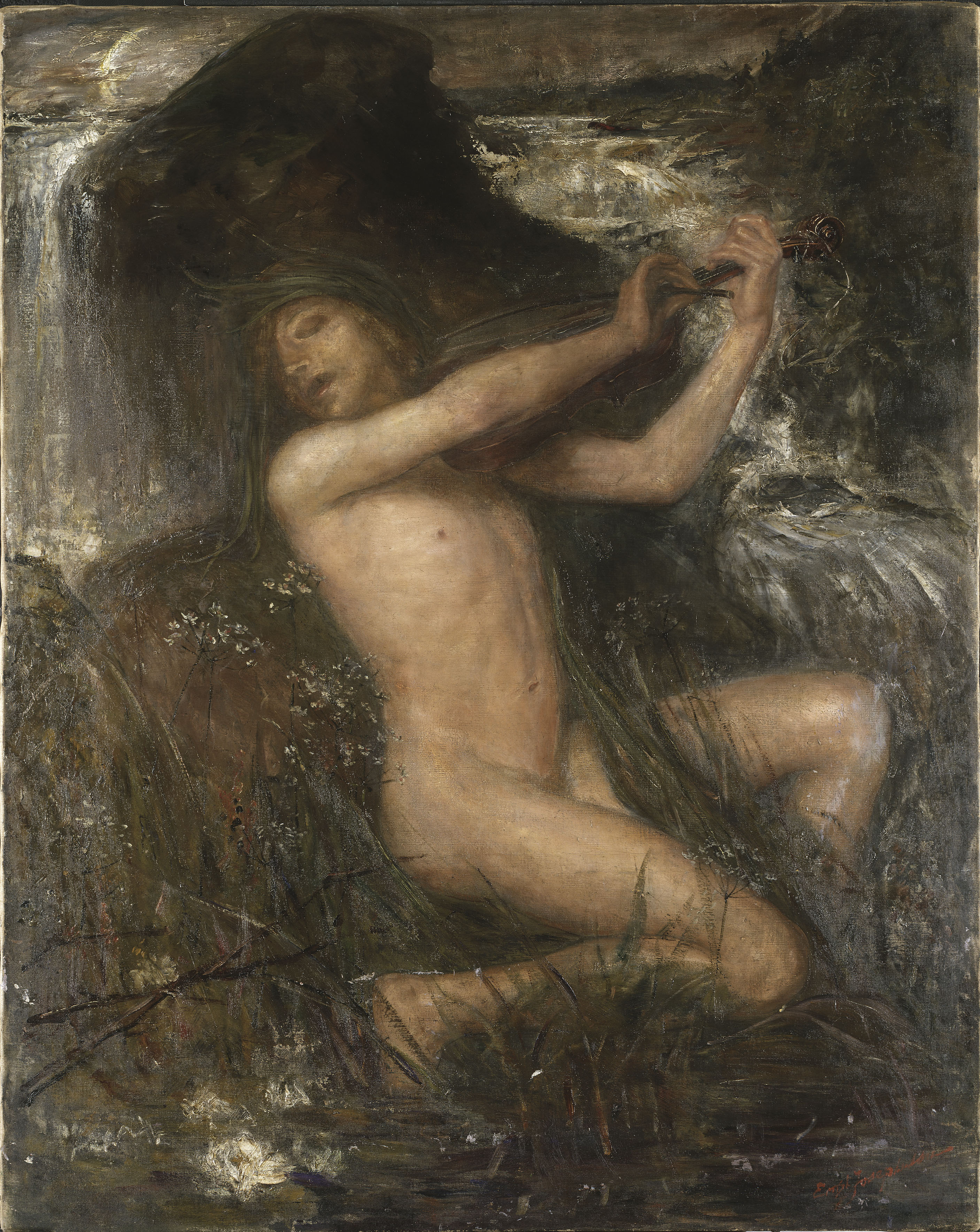
"Näckaspel" refers to the Nixie or water spirit, here painted by Ernst Josephson, 1882.

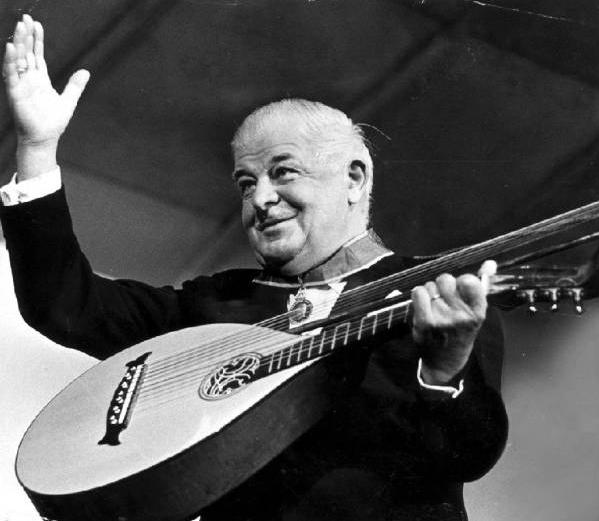
Evert Taube wrote "'Blue Bird' av Hull" in 1929.

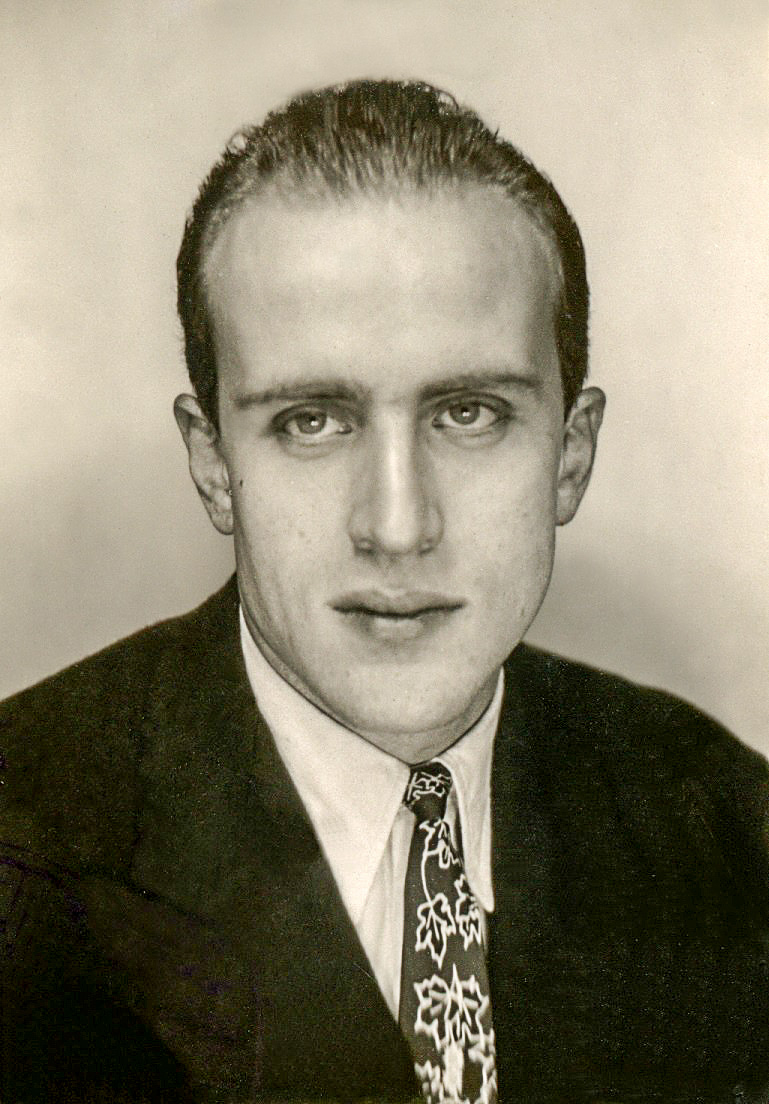
Boris Vian wrote "Le Déserteur" in 1954.

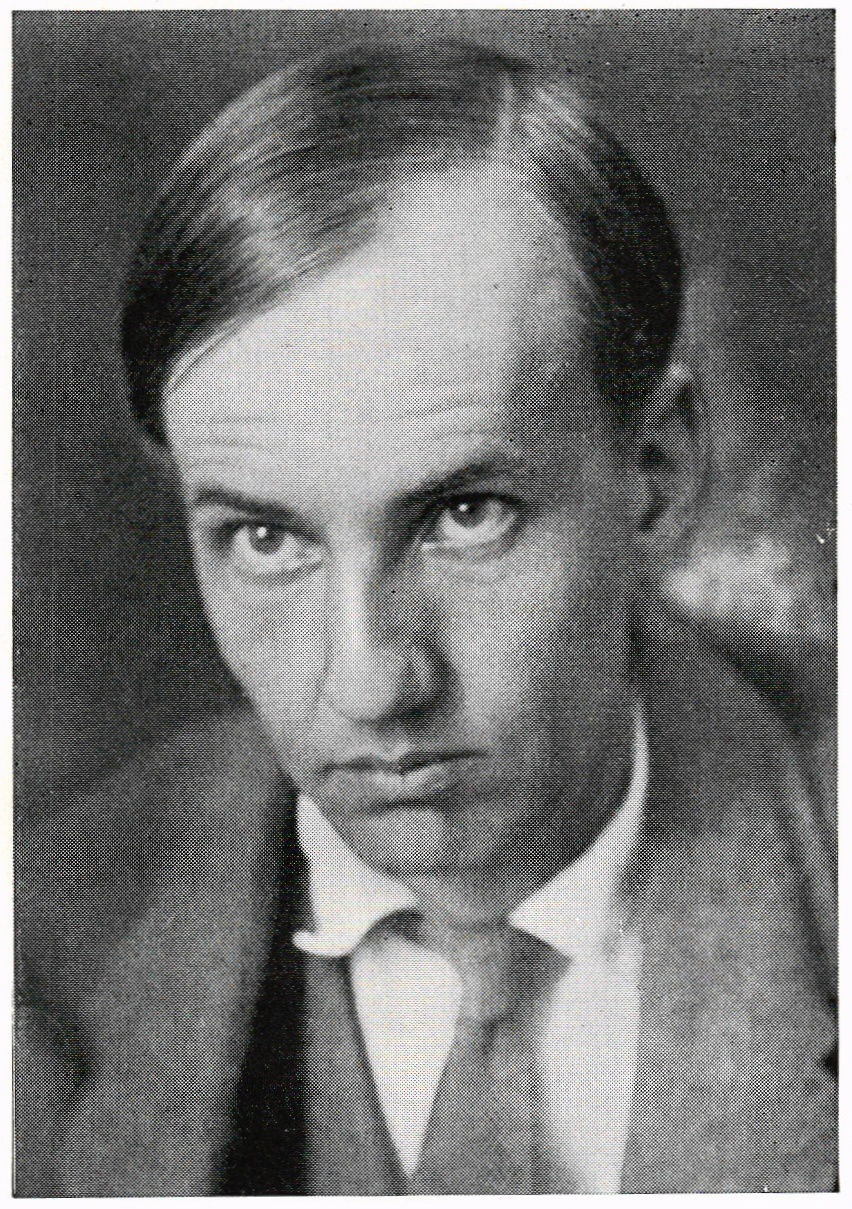
Dan Andersson wrote the poem "Hemlängtan" in 1915.

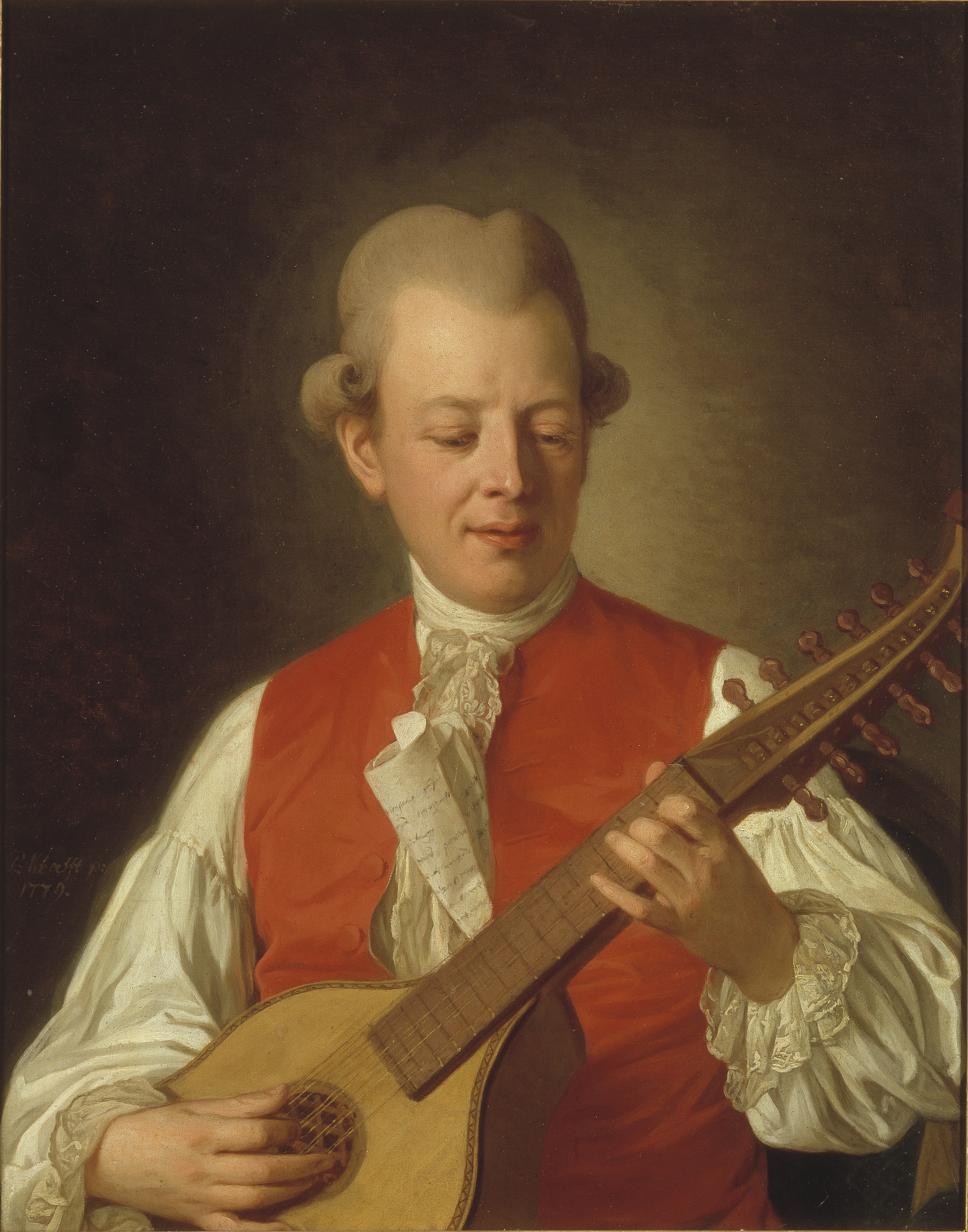
Carl Michael Bellman published "Märk hur vår skugga" in 1790.

== Musicians ==
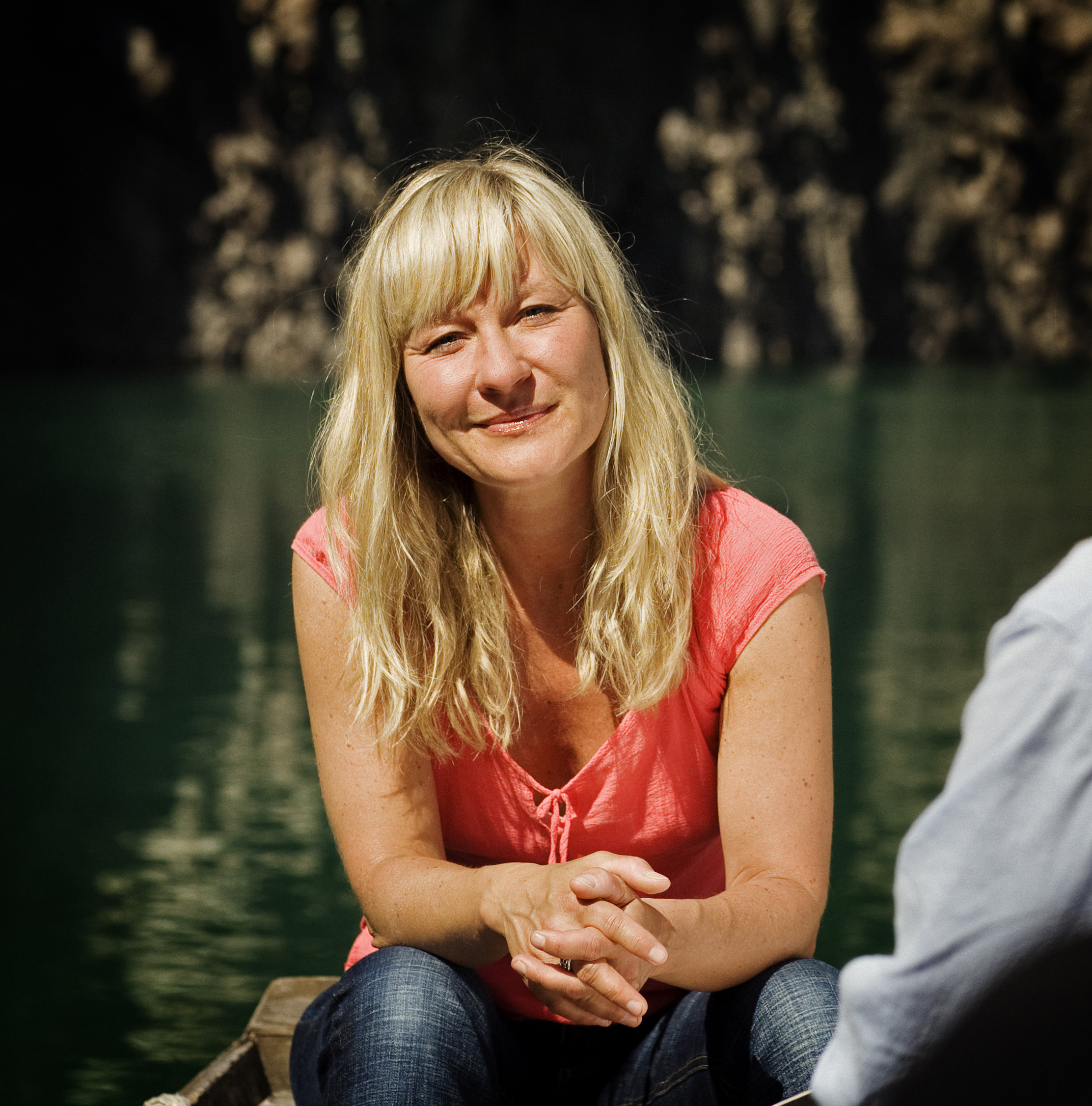
The Swedish folk musician Lena Willemark joined Karlsson for the album.

- Nils Berg – bass clarinet
- Henrik Cederblom – dobro
- Esbjörn Hazelius – cittern, violin, viola, guitar, bouzuki, voice
- Sara Isaksson – voice, Wurlitzer
- Sofia Karlsson – voice, Hammond B3, harmonium, flute, piccolo, bouzouki
- Olle Linder – contrabass, percussion, voice
- Sofie Livebrant – piano
- Peter Lysell – contrabass
- Lisa Rydberg – violin
- Roger Tallroth – tenor guitar, guitar, voice
- Lena Willemark – voice

== Reception ==
Visor från vinden had a mixed to positive reception, with an average score of 3.4/5 on review aggregator Kritiker.se, based on fifteen reviews. Among the more negative reviewers was Aftonbladet's Jonna Sima. She called the music "traditional" and "stylish" but "dull in comparison with song interpreters like Cornelis Vreeswijk." Expressen's reviewer Anders Dahlbom wrote that the album felt like a logical follow-on from the 2005 "Svarta Ballader". In his view, Karlsson gave new life to poems and songs by Dan Andersson, Wiehe, Peps, Taube, and others. He found Karlsson's "detailed traditional folk sounds strangely timeless", predicting it would be a success.

Among the more positive reviewers was Dagens Industri's Jan Gradvall. He commented that Karlsson had "honed her artistry to perfection", and compared her to the 1960s troubadours Fred Åkerström and Cornelis Vreeswijk. Norran's reviewer Olle Lundqvist felt that she was "one of the new millennium's musical exclamation marks", and predicted that audiences would continue to be excited by Karlsson's work. In his view, the singing and the interpretations of the songs were "straight, yet personal". He found "nothing ingratiating, but plenty of individuality and integrity. This is song with style and soul." Sundsvalls Tidning's reviewer Per-Roger Carlsson wrote that the album was more varied than Svarta ballader, but that Karlsson "lives on her expression and is firmly rooted in song. No experiment and improvisation, but with song tradition as her fixed point." He called the album "Fine vocal art from a great vocal artist."

Svenska Dagbladet's reviewer Ingrid Strömdahl noted the choice of two poems by Baudelaire, in particular as translated by Dan Andersson, and their settings by Sofie Livebrant. She found the version of Taube's brig Bluebird "heart-stopping". She noted that the songs were diverse, from Bellman to Wiehe, but felt that they were sung "sensitively and with lovely ornamentation to the varied orchestration." Östgöta Correspondenten found the performances "absolutely perfect", commenting that "the piano and the wind instruments are unbalanced so that it is not only beautiful, but a touch bitter, too."

== Awards ==
Visor från vinden has won several prizes. In 2008, Karlsson received the Swedish Grammis in the category "folk music/song", and the Danish Music Award in the category "Best foreign albums". In the Manifestgalan the same year, Visor från vinden won the prize in the category "Folk music/song". The jury called it a "folk song so intensely present that everything seems born in the moment" with "a musicality both rooted in folk music tradition and timelessly modern."

== Charts ==
Visor från vinden reached second on the Swedish album chart, Karlsson's best list placement, shared by her 2014 album Regnet faller utan oss. The album stayed in the chart for 37 weeks (April 2007-March 2008).

Chart (2007–2008)	Peak position
Sweden	2
