= Sorrow of the Angels =

Studio album by While Heaven Wept
- Released: June 1998
- Recorded: August 1997 – January 1998
- Studio: Neptune Studios
- Genre: Doom metal
- Length: 39:00
- Label: Eibon Records
- Producer: Tom Phillips; Jon Paquin; Jp; Mauro Berchi

While Heaven Wept chronology
The Mourning Split 7" (1997)	Sorrow of the Angels (1998)	Of Empires Forlorn (2002)

Sorrow of the Angels is an album by the American doom metal band While Heaven Wept.

== Track listing ==
1. "Thus with a Kiss I Die" - 16:58
2. "Into the Wells of Sorrow" - 9:44
3. "The Death of Love" - 9:57
4. "September" - 2:21

== Personnel ==
- Tom Phillips – guitars, vocals, and keyboards
- Danny Ingerson – bass, keyboards
- Jon Paquin – drums
