= Black as Death =

Studio album by Iron Mask
- Released: December 16, 2011
- Recorded: 2011
- Genre: Power metal
- Length: 67:26
- Labels: AFM Records, Marquee/Avalon
- Producer: Dushan Petrossi

Iron Mask chronology
Shadow of the Red Baron (2009)	Black as Death (2011)	Fifth Son of Winterdoom (2013)

Professional ratings
Review scores
Source	Rating
Metal-Temple	7/10 stars
Metal Kaoz	6/10 stars
Metal Storm	8/10 stars
Sputnikmusic	(4.3/5)
Lords of Metal	(73/100)

Black as Death is the fourth studio album by Belgian power metal band Iron Mask, released on December 16, 2011 by AFM Records. All songs were composed by Dushan Petrossi. The album marks another change in band-lineup, comprising ex-Yngwie Malmsteen bandmates Mark Boals, Göran Edman, and Mats Olausson.

== Track listing ==
1. "From Light into the Dark" – 1:41
2. "Black as Death" – 6:59
3. "Broken Hero" – 3:18
4. "Feel the Fire" – 4:34
5. "Genghis Khan" – 5:53
6. "God Punishes, I Kill" – 7:40
7. "Rebel Kid" – 5:02
8. "Blizzard of Doom" – 5:20
9. "The Absence" – 4:08
10. "Magic Sky Requiem" – 5:40
11. "Nosferatu" – 6:27
12. "When All Braves Fall" – 5:41
13. "Sons of The Sun" (Japan Bonus Track) - 4:31
14. "Evil Strikes in Silence" (Europe Bonus Track) – 4:47
15. "March of The Slaves" (vinyl bonus track)

== Personnel ==
- Dushan Petrossi - all guitars, orchestral samples
- Mark Boals - lead vocals, bass-guitar
- Vassili Moltchanov - bass
- Mats Olausson - keyboards
- Ramy Ali - drums
- Roma Siadletski - harsh vocals
- Goetz "Valhalla Jr." Mohr - guest vocals on 13, 14
- Göran Edman - guest vocals on 10
- Oliver Hartmann - backing vocals and choirs

== Technical personnel ==
- Mix & mastering, drum recording - Dennis Ward at House of Audio, Germany
- Guitars, bass, orchestral samples recording - Dushan Petrossi at Iron Kingdom Studio, Belgium
- Vocals recording - Mark Boals, USA
- Keyboards recording - Mats Olausson, Sweden
- Artwork - Genzoman
- Frontcover concept - Dushan Petrossi
- Design and layout - Thomas Ewerhard
