= The Outcast Hall of Fame =

The Outcast Hall Of Fame

Studio album by Evil Masquerade
- Released: 2016
- Genre: Heavy metal
- Label: Dark Minstrel Music
- Producer: Henrik Flyman

Evil Masquerade chronology
The Digital Crucifix (2014)	The Outcast Hall Of Fame (2016)

The Outcast Hall Of Fame is the seventh full-length album by the Swedish/Danish band Evil Masquerade.

== Track listing ==
All songs written by Henrik Flyman except Märk Hur Vår Skugga which was written by Carl Michael Bellman.

No.	Title	Length
1.	"The Outcast Hall Of Fame"	4:10
2.	"Death Of God"	3:58
3.	"Darkness (I Need You)"	3:57
4.	"One Thousand Roses And A Lot Of Pain"	2:43
5.	"Lost Inside A World Of Fear"	4:28
6.	"The Spineless"	5:28
7.	"Märk Hur Vår Skugga"	4:44
8.	"On No Way To Broadway"	12:33

== Personnel ==
Evil Masquerade

- Henrik Flyman – guitar & vocals
- Dennis Buhl – drums
- Thor Jeppesen – bass
- Artur Meinild – keyboard

Additional performers

- Mats Levén – vocals
- Rick Altzi – vocals
- Apollo Papathanasio – vocals
- Nicklas Sonne – lead vocals
- Yenz Leonhardt – backing vocals

Production

- Produced by Henrik Flyman.
- Mixed and mastered by Tommy Hansen at Jailhouse Studios.
- Paintings by David Troest.
- Photos by Thomas Trane.
- Artwork by Gunbarrel Offensive Design.
