= While Heaven Wept =

American epic doom metal band

- Origin: Virginia
- Genre: Epic doom metal
- Years active: 1989–2017; 2018; 2019; 2025–present
- Labels: Nuclear Blast Records; Cruz Del Sur Music; Black Lotus Records; Eibon Records; Rage of Achilles Records; Rock Machine Records
- Members: Tom Phillips; Jim Hunter; Scott Loose; Trevor Schrotz; Rain Irving

While Heaven Wept (often abbreviated as WHW) are an American epic doom metal band based in Dale City, Virginia. The primary writer and overall engine of the band is front man Tom Phillips. Their melodic, classically influenced style could be compared to bands such as Solitude Aeturnus and Solstice (the latter of which Tom Phillips is a former member); however, 2003's acclaimed Of Empires Forlorn saw the band branching out into a variety of metal and progressive styles. This trend continues on their 2009 album, Vast Oceans Lachrymose, and on their 2011 album, Fear of Infinity.

While Heaven Wept's lyrics deal with sorrow, personal loss and despondency.

== Members ==
=== Current ===
- Tom Phillips (ex-Solstice, ex-Twisted Tower Dire, ex-Brave) - vocals, guitars, keyboards
- Jim Hunter (Twisted Tower Dire, October 31, Revelation) - bass
- Scott Loose (Brave, Human Theory) - guitars
- Trevor Schrotz (Brave) - drums
- Michelle Schrotz (Brave) - keyboards, vocals
- Rain Irving (Altura) - vocals
- Jason Lingle (Altura) - keyboards, vocals

=== Guests ===
- Mark Zonder (Warlord, ex-Fates Warning) - drums on "Suspended At Aphelion"
- Victor Arduini (ex-Fates Warning) - lead guitar on "Suspended At Aphelion"
- Christopher Ladd - classical guitar on "Suspended At Aphelion"
- Mark Shuping - cello and violin on "Suspended At Aphelion"
- Mickey Rey Diaz - vocals live at ROAM, November 10, 2018

=== Former ===
- Jason Gray (ex-Forty Days Longing) - drums
- Angelo Tringali (Slough Feg) - guitars (live)
- Fred Provoost (ex-Whispering Gallery) - keyboards (live)
- Jon Paquin - drums
- Scott Waldrop (Twisted Tower Dire) - guitars
- Jim Murad (ex-Twisted Tower Dire) - bass
- Wiley Wells (Novembers Doom, Those Are They) - keyboards
- Danny Ingerson (ex-Dysrhythmia (band)) - bass
- Kevin Hufnagel (Dysrhythmia (band), Gorguts) - guitar
- Gabe Funston - bass
- Phil Bloxam - (ex-Hellion - DC underground metal band) - drums
- Jake Bodnar - keyboards
- Kenny Thomas - guitars, vocals
- "Diamond" Dave - bass
- James Whorton - drums
- Jason Stone - bass
- David Bornhauser - guitars
- Tony Garcia - guitars
- Chad Peevy - bass
- Brendan "Ber" Galvan - vocals
- Chris Galvan - guitars
- Jim Chappell - drums

== Discography ==
- Into the Wells of Sorrow 7-inch - Open Eye Records (1994)
- Lovesongs of the Forsaken - Promo (1994)
- Lovesongs of the Forsaken EP - Sinistrari Records (1995)
- The Mourning split 7-inch with Cold Mourning, Game Two Records 1997
- Sorrow of the Angels - Eibon Records (1998)
- Chapter One: 1989-1999 2x LP Retrospective - Metal Supremacy Records (2002)
- The Drowning Years 7-inch Single - Maniacal Records (2002)
- Of Empires Forlorn - Eibon Records (2003 Limited Edition), Rage of Achilles Records (2003), Rock Machine Records (2005 South American Pressing)
- Vast Oceans Lachrymose - Cruz Del Sur Music (2009)
- Vessel 7-inch Single - High Roller Records / Maniacal (2010)
- Triumph:Tragedy:Transcendence - Cruz Del Sur Music (2010)
- The Arcane Unearthed 2x LP Retrospective - High Roller Records (2011)
- Fear of Infinity - Nuclear Blast Records (2011)
- Suspended at Aphelion - Nuclear Blast Records (2014)

=== Compilation appearances ===
- Scenecubator (features "The Mourning") - Open Eye Records (1994)
- Nightshade Vol.1 (features "Sorrow Of The Angels") - Private Release by Scott DeFusco (Curse Of The Chains 'zine) (1995)
- Funeral Aspects (features "Sorrow Of The Angels") - Private Release by Patrick Walker (Warning) (1995)
- Time Brings Only Sadness (features "Sorrow Of The Angels") - Private Release by Oliver Richling (1995)
- At the Mountains of Madness (features "Into the Wells of Sorrow") - Miskatonic Foundation (1999)
- Knuckletracks XLV (features "The Drowning Years") - Brave Words & Bloody Knuckles Magazine (2002)
- Terrorized V25 (features "The Drowning Years") - Terrorizer Magazine #115 (2003)
- Obskure Sombre Records Doom Fuzz Compilation 2003 (features "The Drowning Years" single version) - Obskure Sombre Records (2003)
- Dark Moon Vol.1 - A Tribute To The Black Spirit (features "Destroyer Of Solace") - More Music and Media GmbH (2011)
- ProgPower USA XII DVD (features "Of Empires Forlorn" and "Voice In The Wind") - ProgPower USA (2012)
