= Fifth Son of Winterdoom =

Studio album by Iron Mask
- Released: November 8, 2013
- Recorded: 2013
- Genre: Power metal
- Length: 67:49
- Label: AFM Records, Marquee/Avalon
- Producer: Dushan Petrossi

Iron Mask chronology
Black as Death (2011)	Fifth Son of Winterdoom (2013)	Diabolica (2016)

Fifth Son of Winterdoom is the fifth studio album by Belgian power metal band Iron Mask, that was released on November 8, 2013, by AFM Records. All songs were composed by Dushan Petrossi. LA Weekly named its cover as the second most ridiculous metal album cover of 2013.

== Track listing ==
1. "Back into Mystery" – 05:10
2. "Like a Lion in a Cage" – 05:07
3. "Only One Commandment" – 03:47
4. "Seven Samurai" – 05:24
5. "Fifth Son of Winterdoom" – 10:03
6. "Angel Eyes, Demon Soul" – 03:22
7. "Rock Religion" – 04:38
8. "Father Farewell" – 04:43
9. "Eagle of Fire" – 04:20
10. "Reconquista 1492" – 07:03
11. "Run to Me" – 04:38
12. "The Picture of Dorian Grey" – 07:54
13. "We Were brothers" (instrumental) (Japan bonus track) – 1:17

== Personnel ==
- Dushan Petrossi – all guitars, orchestral samples
- Mark Boals – lead vocals
- Vassili Moltchanov – bass
- Andreas Lindhal – keyboards
- Ramy Ali – drums
