= Time Requiem =

Swedish neoclassical power metal band

- Origin: Skurup, Sweden
- Genres: Power metal, neoclassical metal, progressive metal
- Years active: 2001–present
- Label: Regain
- Members: Richard Andersson; Göran Edman; Magnus Nilsson; Andy Rose; Jörg Andrews
- Website: www.anderssonmusic.com

Time Requiem is a Swedish neoclassical power metal band created by Richard Andersson in 2001. Andersson created the band that summer, when he felt that his previous project - Majestic - had come to a dead end.

== Biography ==
Andersson took Peter Wildoer, Apollo Papathanasio and Magnus Nord with him to his new band. Martin Wezovski turned out to be too inexperienced to be able to play the bass in the band and was replaced by Dick Lövgren (Meshuggah). They produced their first self-titled album, in 2002.

In 2003, Andersson and the rest of the band played in Japan. This concert was recorded and released on a live CD. Unleashed In Japan contained some songs from Time Requiem, but also had some new material.

Afterwards, Wildoer became preoccupied with death metal band Darkane, and left Time Requiem to focus more on his own project. Lövgren and Andersson were having issues in regards to their musical differences, and also left. They were later replaced by Zoltan Csörsz and Jonas Reingold. With this lineup, a new album was made. It was given the name The Inner Circle of Reality.

== Line-up ==
- Richard Andersson - keyboards
- Göran Edman - vocals
- Magnus Nilsson - guitars
- Andy Rose - bass
- Jörg Andrews - drums

== Former members ==
- Peter Wildoer - drums
- Apollo Papathanasio - vocals
- Magnus Nord - guitars
- Zoltan Csörsz - drums
- Jonas Reingold - bass
- Dick Lövgren - bass

== Discography ==
- Time Requiem (2002)
- Unleashed In Japan (2003)
- The Inner Circle of Reality (2004)
- Optical Illusion (2006)
