= Didier Chesneau =

French guitarist

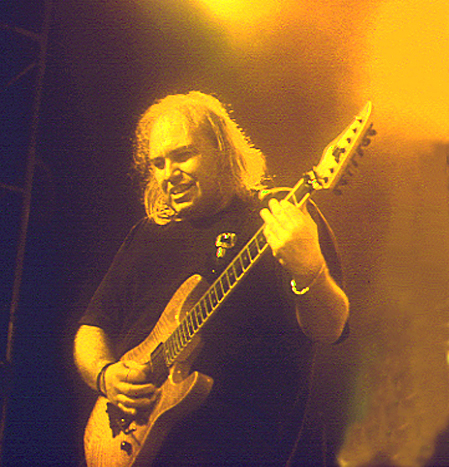
- Didier Chesneau live

Background information
- Born: Didier Chesneau
- Origin: Vincennes, France
- Occupations: Guitarist, composer, sound engineer, director
- Instrument: Guitar
- Years active: 1994 -present
- Member of: Headline
- Website: Headline Website

Didier Chesneau is a French guitarist (Lag/Elixir/Larrivée/Rocktron), composer (NTS/Wagram), sound engineer and director (Universal, Wagram, EMI, SPV).

== Early work ==
Didier discovers music playing saxophone (like his musician father), but wanting to get free from the academic side of the conservatory, he quickly decides to play guitar. At first self-educated, he is then taught about technique and harmony by Nils Aziosmanoff and Charles Raynal (teacher in the Berklee College). Nils opens him the doors of the Parisians studios, and aside from his sound engineer's studies, he starts recording regular sessions and accompaniments. He meets Sylvie Grare at the studio and after a first demo along with Patrick Rondat's musicians, they cast musicians and found the band Headline in 1994.

From then: Midem, winner of the Tremplin International du Salon de la Musique, Dani « Guitarist Magazine » Giorgetti allow them to perform at the festival « Cannes Musique Passion » (from which they get unforgettable memories of Stuart Hamm, Jonathan Mover, Michel Cusson…).

== Headline ==
In 1997, first Headline's album Escape is released. Success is immediate, the album wins as the fifth most promising international release and the band goes on an acoustic FNAC tour. Back then, Olivier Garnier, label manager of CNR label, gives them the opportunity to play with Vanden Plas, Dio, Superior… Aside from Headline and his work as sound engineer, Didier Chesneau runs during five years the direction of « Backstage », two music schools in the region Centre, thanks to which he organises trimestrial master classes welcoming among others Patrick Rondat, Jean-Claude Rapin, Pascal Mulot, Sébastien Choir…

In 1999, Olivier Garnier initiates the first French deal of his new label NTS, releasing Voices of Presence, the second album of Headline. French tours, Printemps de Bourges, show cases, the band plays along with prestigious bands as Dream Theater, Stratovarius, Vanden Plas, Rhapsody and win as 2nd and 5th of the best French bands according to the readers of musical and metal press.

Thanks to the stunt companies Skyros and Mythics Warriors (Merlin, Braveheart, Gladiator…), Headline shoots its first video clip in the cathartic fortress of Queribus, directed by Stéphane Marty (The X Files…). As a co-producer of Headline's albums, Didier Chesneau is asked for a lot of directing projects and ends up working for numerous artists while keeping on doing demos (Salon de la Musique, Musicmania…) for LAG and ROCKTRON.

When Duality, the band's 3rd album, is released at the end of 2002, Headline wins as the best French band and best video clip of the year (directed by Stéphane Roland) thanks to MCM/Hard Rock Mag audience. They go on tour in Europe along with Evergrey and After Forever, at the Hirson festival and Trophées « hard rock » broadcast on MCM, as well as on acoustic show cases… At the end of 2003, they go on tour from Amsterdam to Grenade and all around Europe with the American band Symphony X. The last promotional date of « Duality » is at « Tournai Prog Event Festival » in Belgium, at the beginning of 2004

== Other activities ==
Didier Chesneau works on a lot of projects: « Ritchie Blackmore Tribute » (Lion Music), « Bass Attitudes » (XIII bis), « Métisse » (musical), « Shooting Star » (Arcade)… At the end of 2004, he composes with M. Aurore Gotta (J. Hallyday, P. Bachelet…) the soundtrack of « La légende de la licorne », musical produced by his friends « Mythic Warriors ». In 2007, he becomes "musical and technical director" of the band. Others "light and sound" shows are created as "Le Tournoi de la Providence", "Euphelie et les loups", "L'alliance de Brune" (30 000 spectators at Roquebrune, summer 2008).

== Discography with Headline ==
- "Shooting star tribute" 1996 Album
- "Escape" 1997 Album
- "Escape thru the lands" 1998 Acoustic Album
- "Bass attitude" 1999 Album
- "Voices of presence" 2000 Album
- "Other Voices" 2000 Maxi limited ed
- "Duality" 2003 Album
- "Blackmore tribute" 2004 Album
