= Of Empires Forlorn =

Studio album by While Heaven Wept
- Released: June 2003
- Recorded: February-December 2002
- Studio: Assembly Line Studios
- Genre: Doom metal, Epic doom
- Label: Eibon Records; Rage of Achilles Records; Rock Machine Records
- Producer: Kevin 131; Tom Phillips; Jim Hunter

While Heaven Wept chronology
Sorrow of the Angels (1998)	Of Empires Forlorn (2003)	Vast Oceans Lachrymose (2009)

Of Empires Forlorn is a studio album by the American doom metal band While Heaven Wept. The album was released in three different editions by three different labels. The Eibon Records version contains the instrumental track "From Empires to Oceans," while the Rage of Achilles Records and Rock Machine Records editions contain the track "In Aeturnum." The only other differences between the three are minor aspects of the front cover and the formatting of the liner notes/lyrics. The cover is based on Gustave Doré's painting "L'Enigme".

The album was rated 3 out of 5 stars by AllMusic.

== Track listing ==
1. "The Drowning Years" – 5:41
2. "Of Empires Forlorn" – 7:49
3. "Voice in the Wind" – 6:25
4. "In Aeturnum" – 7:30 (Omitted on the Eibon Records version)
5. "Soulsadness" – 7:24
6. "Epistle No. 81" – 3:24
7. "Sorrow of the Angels" – 4:47
8. "From Empires to Oceans" – 7:18 (Only on Eibon Records version)

== Credits ==
- Tom Phillips – guitars, vocals, and keyboards
- Jim Hunter – bass
- Jason Gray – drums
- Scott Loose – guitars

Additional keyboards by Michelle Loose and Jake Bordnar.

Recorded at Assembly Line Studios, February 2002 - June 2003. Produced, engineered, and mixed by Kevin 131. Mastered by Bill Wolf Productions.
