= Alex Masi =

Italian guitarist

Alex Masi (born 14 May 1960) is an Italian guitarist.

== Biography ==
Masi was born in Venice and studied at the Conservatory of Music in Verona. He formed the heavy rock band Dark Lord in 1984 and recorded two EPs with them. In the early 1980s Masi moved briefly to London, where he played with several musicians in the NWOBHM scene.

With Dark Lord he toured as opening act for several major acts of the period until 1986, when he was invited by Metal Blade Records to move to Los Angeles and join the band Sound Barrier. He later founded a band of his own, called Masi. First album under the name MASI was called "Fire in the Rain" and it featured the single "Fire in the Rain". The second, more successful album under the name MASI was titled "Downtown Dreamers" it featured the hit single "God Promised a Paradise" which was on Heavy Rotation on MTV for a couple of months and is still on rotation on VH1 Classics. His first solo album was Attack of the Neon Shark, which received a Grammy nomination for Best Instrumental Rock Album. The second solo album was called Vertical Invader, and featured only Masi along with drummer John Macaluso.

In 1998 Masi published the first album of a successful trilogy dedicated to three of the most famous classical musicians in history, entitled In the Name of Bach. This was followed by In the name of Mozart and In the Name of Beethoven. Around the same time he released his last Masi album, Eternal Struggle. In 2006 he published the solo album Late Nights at Desert Rimrock. 2011 saw the release of the first solo instrumental album featuring elements of electronica associated with intense guitar work, the album "Theory of Everything" was released through Lion Music and featured the single "Ladies of the House". Later, in 2013 the second album featuring a heavy electronica influence was titled "Danger Zone" released on Grooveyard Records.

Also very relevant in Alex Masi's production are the two albums released under the moniker MCM, featuring John Macaluso on drums and the late Randy Coven on bass. The first album titled "Ritual Factory" was recorded and released after a successful tour of Central America while the following release "!900 Hard Times" was recorded live during shows in the US and Europe.

He has collaborated in the studio and live with: Chris Aable, Carmine Appice, Allan Holdsworth, John Macaluso, Randy Coven, Ray Gillen, Claude King, Steve Bailey, Frankie Banali, Shawn Lane, Joseph Williams, Robin McCauley, Ken Templin, Rudy Sarzo, Jeff Pilson, Briam McDonald, Jeff Scott Soto, Mark Free, Mark Boals etc.

Masi lives and works in Los Angeles, California.

== Discography ==
- Dark Lord (EP) (1983, with Dark Lord)
- State of Rock (EP) (1985, with Dark Lord)
- Fire in the Rain (1987)
- Downtown Dreamers (1988)
- Attack of the Neon Shark (1989)
- Vertical Invader (1990)
- Tales from the North (1995)
- The Watcher (1997)
- In the Name of Bach (1999)
- Steel String Bach (2000)
- Condition Red (2000, with Condition Red)
- Eternal Struggle (2001)
- Condition Red II (2003, with Condition Red)
- In the Name of Mozart (2004)
- Ritual Factory (2004, with MCM)
- In the Name of Beethoven (2005)
- Late Nights at Desert's Rimrock (2006)
- Pastrami Standards (2006, with The Trio of Stridence)
- 1900: Hard Times (Live) (2007, with MCM)
- Theory of Everything (2010)
- Danger Zone (2013)
