= Twisted Tower Dire =

- Origin: Chantilly, Virginia
- Genres: Power metal, heavy metal
- Years active: 1995-

Twisted Tower Dire is an American heavy/power metal band from Chantilly, Virginia that formed in 1995.

== Musical style and influences ==
Their style was considered to be a harder application 1980s-style power metal. Metal Hammer described the band's sound as "high-energy, sword-wielding metal". The band is influenced by new wave of British heavy metal acts such as Iron Maiden and Judas Priest. They have also drawn comparisons to American acts such as Queensyrche, Savatage and Dio. Like many other bands of this ilk, their lyrical themes include heroes and fantasy.

== Legacy ==
Twisted Tower Dire did not achieve the commercial success or recognition that many other power metal bands did, and they are now considered by many to be an underrated act. Decibel called the band an "unsung gem". Metal Hammer stated that the band's "ambition never translated to mass appeal, [and] their world-class USPM remain[ed] resolutely underground."

== Discography ==
=== Studio albums ===
- The Curse of Twisted Tower (1999)
- The Isle of Hydra (2001)
- Crest of the Martyrs (2003)
- Netherworlds (2007)
- Make It Dark (2011)
- Wars in the Unknown (2019)
