= Esa Pietilä =

Finnish saxophonist and composer

Esa Pietilä (born 1964) is a Finnish saxophonist and composer who works diversely on the field of contemporary music. He studied saxophone and composition in Sibelius- Academy jazz department in Helsinki and privately in US with David Liebman. In his home country, the Yrjö Jazz award 2016 was given to him for his original, genre-defying work in the field of avant-garde jazz.

== Career ==
Esa Pietilä started his career as a jazz musician and later on has expanded his expression to many different musical genres. He has performed with his jazz groups e.g. Liberty Ship, Esa Pietilä 3, with his duo collaborations with contemporary classical & new music chamber musicians, as soloist for chamber orchestras, other larger ensembles and performing totally free improvisations at his solo concerts. Pietilä has worked e.g. with conductors Esa-Pekka Salonen, Santtu-Matias Rouvali, Ville Matvejeff, Tibor Boganyi, Hossein Piskar, Jan Söderblom and Erkki Lasonpalo, with Avanti! Chamber Orchestra. Pietilä has premiered the saxophone concerto of Kalevi Aho, Eero Hämeenniemi and Pietilä´s concerto "Graffiti Play" for chamber orchestra & contemporary jazz trio and Pulses, Waves & Dialoques for tenor saxophone & string orchestra. His collaborators on the field of jazz have been Paal Nilssen-Love, Harvey Sorgen, Michael Jefry Stevens, Mathias Eick, Jeff Siegel, Karl Berger, Mark Helias, Brian Melvin, Heiri Kaenzig, Christoph Baumann, Baenz Öster, Franziska Baumann, Mike Nock, Ron McClure, Claudio Fasoli, Anders Begcrantz, Odean Pope, Hilmar Jensson, Raoul Björkenheim. Markku Ounaskari, Ulf Krokfors, Iro Haarla.

== List of works as a composer ==
- "Graffiti Play", concerto for Tenor Saxophone, contemporary Jazz Trio (ts, bs, drs) & chamber orchestra . F.P. 2014 by Esa-Pekka Salonen & Avanti! Chamber Orchestra
- Pulses, Waves & Dialoques for tenor saxophone & string orchestra, F.P 2017 by St. Michel Strings & Pietilä
- Blue, Black & Sun (string quartet No. 2), 14:27´, Fennica Gehrman, F.P. feb. 2022 by SKATTA String Quartet
- Blazing Flames for tenor saxophone & string quartet, 28´, (2018). F.P. 2018 with KAMUS String quartet & Pietilä
- Glow for tenor saxophone, acc., perc & live-electronics, 16´. (2018), F.P. 2018 with Veli Kujala (acc), Janne Tuomi (drs & perc.) & Pietilä
- Zefyros flute sonata, 9:14´, F.P with Sami Junnonen (fl) & Tuomas Turriago (p), 8th Apr. 2022, Tampere Biannale
- Uirapuru for tenor saxophone & male choir (40 voices and up), 11´, (2017) F.P. 2017 by Akademiska Sångföreningen & Pietilä
- Triptych for tenor saxophone & church organ, 18´, F.P. 2016 by Pétur Sakari (pipe organ) & Esa Pietilä
- Saturn – Fantasy for tenor saxophone & church organ, 16´, F.P. by 2012 by Pétur Sakari & Esa Pietilä
- Asterion, for 8 -piece chamber group, F.P. by Zagros Ensemble 2014
- HUNT! for Percussion Quintet & Tenor Saxophone, F.P by Osuma Ensemble 2016
- Hyperhelium, for Chamber sextet & Tenor Saxophone, F.P. by Tampere Raw Sextet
- Seven For Amazonas, for Recorder Quartet, F.P. (to be come 2017) by Bravade Quartet
- Brisk, for cello & marimba, F.P. by Eeva Rysä & Kazutaka Morita 2016
- Seppo´s Hammer, for chamber strings & jazz quintet
- People People, for chamber strings & jazz quintet
- Ahead - Electric Microland, for tenor saxophone, accordion & live-electronics
- Colors of Liberation, for tenor saxophone
- Orbits, for electric kantele & tenor saxophone
- Three Strides of Light, for solo piano
- Lake of Clang, for saxophone quartet (SATB)
- Before Moon, for Big Band
- Labyrinth, for big band
- Big Fun, for 12 musicians
- Code Red, for Big Band
- House of Bells, for solo piano
- Mirage, for string quartet
- Tricks, for Big Band
- Turms, for Big Band
- Welho, for 12- piece jazz orchestra
- various pieces for jazz groups
- various chamber group pieces for mixed setups
- various solo pieces for saxophone

== Discography ==
- Liberty Ship — The Wide Open Suite & Noises At Sea
- Mart Soo & Esa Pietilä — Lighthouse Stories
- Solo Saxophone - Times & Spaces
- Liberty Ship — Approaching
- Esa Pietilä & Jeff Siegel — Out doors
- Brain Inventory Trio — The Wall
- Esa Pietilä, solo saxophone — Karhea
- Esa Pietilä Trio — Travel of Fulica atra
- Johannes Mössinger & Esa Pietilä— Natural Flow
- Esa Pietilä Trio — Direct
- Esa Pietilä Quintet— Fastjoik
- The Case — Codes
