= Welcome to the Show (album) =

Studio album by Evil Masquerade
- Released: 2004
- Genre: Heavy metal
- Length: 45:16
- Label: Dark Minstrel Music

Evil Masquerade chronology
Welcome to the Show (2004)	Theatrical Madness (2005)

Welcome to the Show is the debut studio album by the Danish heavy metal band Evil Masquerade. It almost immediately received worldwide recognition and made the charts in Japan at number 8.

== Track listing ==
1. "Intro (Ride of the Valkyries/Grand Opening)" – 1:42
2. "Welcome to the Show" – 3:10
3. "The Wind Will Rise" – 4:53
4. "Oh Harlequin" – 5:05
5. "Surprises in the Dark" – 5:35
6. "But You Were Smiling..." – 4:05
7. "Children of the Light" – 4:19
8. "Lucy the Evil" – 6:09
9. "Badinerie" – 1:36
10. "Deliver Us" – 5:17
11. "Evil Masquerade" – 4:07

The Japanese version of the album contains the bonus track:
Kimi ga Yo (君が代).

== Personnel ==
Evil Masquerade

- Henrik Flyman – guitar, vocals
- Henrik Brockmann – lead vocals
- Dennis Buhl – drums
- Kasper Gram – bass

Additional musicians

- Mats Olausson – keyboard
- André Andersen – keyboard
- Richard Andersson – keyboard
- Lars Boutrup – keyboard
- Ex Københavns Drengekor – choir
- Sanna Thor – laughter
- Anders Juhl Nielsen – trumpet
- Katja Handberg – pizzo violin
- Monika Pedersen – vocals
- Tommy Hansen – moog & bongo

Additional personnel

- Written, composed, arranged and produced by Henrik Flyman.

First part of "Intro" is a newly arranged version of Richard Wagner's Ride of the Valkyries, "Badinerie" origins from the Orchestral Suite (BWV 1067) No. 2 in B minor for flute and strings by Johann Sebastian Bach, "Deliver Us" by Göran Jacobsson/Henrik Flyman.

- Recorded by Henrik Flyman at Digital Bitch, drums recorded by Peter Brander and Henrik Flyman at Media Sound.
- Mixed by Steen Mogensen at Media Sound.
- Mastered by Andy Horn at Famous Kitchen.
- Paintings by Katja Handberg
- Photos by Thomas Trane
- Artwork by Gunbarrel Offensive Design
- Originally released by Marquee/Avalon. Re-released by Dark Minstrel Music
