= Angtoria =

Symphonic metal band

- Origin: Sweden
- Genres: Symphonic metal
- Years active: 2002–2011
- Label: Listenable
- Past members: Sarah Jezebel Deva; Chris Rehn; Tommy Rehn; Dave Pybus; John Henriksson

Angtoria was a symphonic metal band composed of British singer Sarah Jezebel Deva and Swedish brothers Chris and Tommy Rehn.

Singer Sarah Jezebel Deva joined with the brothers in 2001 to create the band. Their debut album, God Has a Plan for Us All, was released on April 27, 2006. The name Angtoria derives its origin from the title of a song by the band Moahni Moahna where Tommy was a member between 1992–1997.

== History ==
The band started with a friendship forged between Sarah and Chris when they were touring in 2001 with Therion and Evergrey. They went on to produce a four-track film soundtrack-like CD in 2002 which was an unofficial demo only for record companies. The band won a competition at gothmetal.net in May 2005, for which their prize was inclusion on a compilation CD. In late 2005, after 99% of the album was written, Tommy Rehn joined the band. They were finally signed by French label Listenable Records.

The album God Has a Plan for Us All features two tracks from the demo. The bassist is Dave Pybus (formerly of Cradle of Filth and Anathema) and male vocals on "Original Sin" were recorded by Aaron Stainthorpe of My Dying Bride. Sarah Jezebel Deva has publicly announced that she plans on reuniting with Chris for a new album sometime in the future.

In 2020, Sarah Jezebel Deva's official FB music page stated that Angtoria will now continue writing music under a different name. Sarah and Chris have parted ways with Tommy Rehn and because he came up with the band name, they can no longer use it. For that matter, their website has also been suspended.

== Band members ==
- Sarah Jezebel Deva – lead vocals
- John Henriksson – drums
- Dave Pybus – bass
- Chris Rehn – rhythm guitar, keyboards
- Tommy Rehn – lead guitar

== Discography ==
- Across Angry Skies (demo, 2004)
- God Has a Plan for Us All (2006)
