= Majestic (band) =

Swedish power metal band

- Origin: Malmö, Sweden
- Genres: Neoclassical metal Power metal
- Years active: 1997–2001
- Label: Massacre Records
- Members: Apollo Papathanasio; Richard Andersson; Martin Wezowski; Magnus Nordh; Peter Wildoer
- Past members: Jonas Blum; Peter Espinoza; Joel Linder

Majestic, formerly known as Lab Rat, was a Swedish neo-classical power metal band, founded in 1997 by Peter Espinoza after he was asked to form a band. Richard Andersson was asked to join and they started to write music for the debut album. Tunes like Golden sea and Standing Alone were meant to be on Peters second solo album but were rearranged for the sound and the keyboard and together the Majestic sound was born. Majestic made two albums: Abstract Symphony (1999) and Trinity Overture (2000), under the label Massacre Records. Peter left the band after the debut album for reunion and touring with Nasty Idols.

== Discography ==
Studio albums

- Abstract Symphony (1999)
- Trinity Overture (2000)

== Last line-up ==
- Apollo Papathanasio (vocals)
- Richard Andersson (keyboards)
- Dick Lövgren (bass)
- Magnus Nordh (guitars)
- Peter Wildoer (drums)

== Former members ==
- Peter Espinoza (guitars) (1997–1999)
- Jonas Blum (vocals) (1997–1999)
- Joel Linder (drums) (1997–1999)
- Martin Wezowski (bass) (1997-1999)
