= Henrik Flyman =

Swedish musician

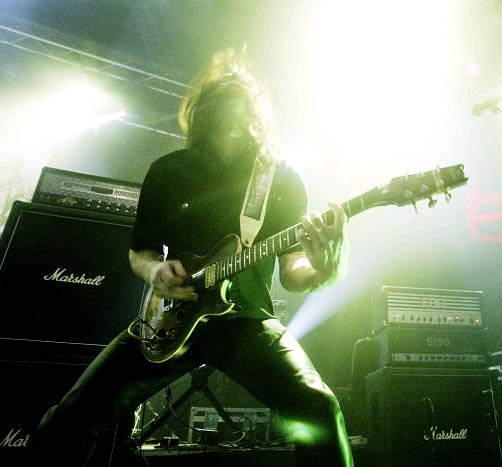

Background information
- Genres: Hard rock, gothic rock, classical music, heavy metal
- Occupations: Composer; Guitarist; Record producer
- Instruments: Guitar, bass, vocals, keyboard
- Label: Dark Minstrel Music
- Website: Official Site

Henrik Flyman (born on September 6 in Norrland, Sweden) is a composer, guitarist and producer. He is active in the bands Lacrimosa, Evil Masquerade and his own solo career.

== Biography ==
Henrik Flyman is best known as a touring and recording musician with Lacrimosa and his own band Evil Masquerade.

In the early days of his career Henrik was a founding member of the Swedish fantasy metal band Moahni Moahna where he was active between 1992 and 1997. A few years later he formed ZooL, which was basically Moahni Moahna with a modified line up and a more classic hard rock sound. ZooL had a brief career and did only release one album. Between 2002 and 2004 he played lead guitars for the Danish Celtic folk metal band Wuthering Heights and in 2003 he founded Evil Masquerade in Copenhagen. The music on their debut album Welcome to the Show had its roots in both classical music and heavy metal and they were soon labeled by media as being theatrical metal.

In 2009 he teams up with Tilo Wolff in the German Dark Wave and Gothic Rock band Lacrimosa on their Sehnsucht World Tour. Henrik is now a touring- and studio musician with the band. In 2009 he also won the Just Plain Folks Music Awards as composer in the category Best Metal Song with Evil Masquerade's Bozo the Clown.

In 2021 Henrik releases music for the first time under his own name. The contradictory titled debut single "Is This The End" is the first of many releases to follow.

== Charity ==
In 2011 Henrik Flyman got involved with Metal for Cancer, a charity organization founded by Richard Ofsoski to raise funds for the Australian Cancer Research Foundation. Flyman wrote the song "Let's Unite in Rock" that was performed by various artists under the name The MFC Dragon Slayer All Star Project. This band included several members from Evil Masquerade as well as Richard Ofsoski, Mats Levén (Therion, Yngwie Malmsteen), Snowy Shaw (Therion, Mercyful Fate, Dream Evil), Tony Kakko (Sonata Arctica), Glen Drover (Megadeth, King Diamond) and Tony Mills (TNT, Shy) just to name a few.

== Equipment ==
- Aria PE-1500
- ENGL|ENGL Amps R. Blackmore Signature E650 head + 4 x 12" standard cabinets

== Discography ==
=== Solo Project ===
- Is This The End - single (2021)
- Snow Angels - single (2021)
- The Great Divide - single (2022)
- Resurrectio - single (2022)
- Serpent Blood - single (2022)
- Not Just Another Girl - single (2022)
- When The Wild Bird Sings - EP (2023)
- Shadow Work - single (2023)
- Spiritual Waltz & Magic - single (2023)
- Tune Out Of The Noise - EP (2023)
- Authority - EP (2023)
- Tune Out Of The Noise II - EP (2023)
- Thorns - EP (2023)
- Time Waits For No One - EP (2023)
- Rise Again - EP (2023)
- One Thousand Roses And A Lot Of Pain - EP (2023)
- Tune Out Of The Noise III - EP (2024)
- This Was Not Supposed To Happen - EP (2024)
- They Tried To Destroy Beauty - EP (2024)
- Hemtrakter - EP (2024)
- Allt ska nog gå - single (2024)
- Personal Hell - single (2024)
- We Are Light - single (2024)
- Tell Me All Your Secrets - single (2024)
- Silent Prayer - single (2024)
- The Embrace - EP (2024)
- Unbreakable - single (2025)
- A Grand Illusion - single (2025)
- Not My Circus - single (2025)
- Shadowbanned - single (2025)
- Dancing With A Ghost - single (2025)

=== With Evil Masquerade ===
- Welcome to the Show (2004)
- Theatrical Madness (2005)
- Third Act (2006, 2007 USA)
- Fade to Black (2008 Japan, 2009)
- Black Ravens Cry - single (2012)
- A Silhouette - single (2012)
- Pentagram (2012)
- Like Voodoo - single (2014)
- The Digital Crucifix (2014)
- 10 Years in the Dark - remastered compilation (2014)
- Märk Hur Vår Skugga - single (2016)
- The Outcast Hall of Fame (2016)

=== With Lacrimosa ===
- Revolution (2012)
- Heute Nacht - EP (2013)
- Live In Mexico City (2 CD) (2014)
- Hoffnung (2015)
- Live in Mexico City - Live DVD (2015)
- Testimonium (2017)
- Leidenschaft (2021)
- Schakal (2 CD) (2024)

=== With Moahni Moahna ===
- Face the Light - EP (1992)
- Temple of Life (1994)
- Queen Shamar - single (1994)
- Why (1997)

=== With Wuthering Heights ===
- To Travel for Evermore (2002)
- Far from the Madding Crowd (2003)

=== Other works ===
- ZooL - ZooL (2002)
- The MFC Dragon Slayer All Star Project - Let's Unite in Rock - single (2011)
- Martin - Sad Eyes - single (2012)
- Black Moon Secret - Another World (2014)
- E-MEN - Teachers - single (2024)

=== Guest appearances ===
- Mino - Fly (2002)

=== Videos ===
- Moahni Moahna - The Quest For the Unholy Sword (1992)
- Moahni Moahna - Radio's to Blame (1996)
- Evil Masquerade - Black Ravens Cry (2007)
- Evil Masquerade - Desire and Pain (2009)
- The MFC Dragon Slayer All Star Project - Let's Unite in Rock (2011)
- Evil Masquerade - A Silhouette (2012)
- Lacrimosa - Revolution (2012)
- Evil Masquerade - Like Voodoo (2014)
- Black Moon Secret - huRt (2014)
- Evil Masquerade - Lost Inside A World Of Fear (2016)
- Evil Masquerade - Märk Hur Vår Skugga (2016)
- Henrik Flyman - Is This The End (2021)
- Henrik Flyman - The Great Divide (2022)
