= Lars Eric Mattsson =

- Origin: Åland, Finland
- Genres: Heavy Metal, Hard rock
- Occupations: musician, composer, record producer
- Instruments: electric guitar
- Years active: 1990s–present
- Labels: Lion Music, Black Dragon Records
- Formerly of: Condition Red, Mattsson, Book of Reflections, Vision
- Website: larsericmattsson.com

Lars Eric "Lasse" Mattsson is a Finnish guitarist, songwriter, and producer known for his contributions to the neoclassical metal genre. He was heavily influenced by classic hard rock bands like Jimi Hendrix and Richie Blackmore as well as guitar virtuosos like Al Di Meola. In 1985, he was discovered by Mike Varney of Guitar Player Magazine and Shrapnel Records. After playing with several local hard rock bands, Mattsson released his first EP, Can't Go On Without Your Love, in 1987. He then signed with Black Dragon Records and released three albums: Eternity (1988), No Surrender (1989), and Electric Voodoo (1991).

In 1992, Mattsson formed the band Vision with Swedish singer Conny Lind, recording the album Lars Eric Mattsson's Vision. However, the label's bankruptcy prevented the release of their follow-up album, and the band eventually split up. Mattsson briefly quit music, but in 1996 he recorded Till the End of Time with Vision, which received positive reviews. In 2000, he formed the progressive band Condition Red, and in 2003, he released Power Games, an album featuring ex-Balance of Power singer Lance King. That same year, Condition Red released their second album, II.

Mattsson continued to release albums throughout the 2000s, including Book of Reflections (2004), a progressive metal concept album/metal opera titled War (2005), and Dream Child (2008), which featured a new female vocalist, Adrienn Antal. He also re-released a remastered version of No Surrender + Live (2009) with bonus live tracks. Mattsson's music is influenced by classical music, classic hard rock, heavy metal, and progressive rock/metal.

== Lion Music ==
Lion Music is a production company and record label founded in 1989 by Mattsson. Lion Music was founded in 1989 by Lars Eric Mattsson as a production company to handle production and licensing for his records in Europe, the United States, and Asia, where a number of deals were signed. After some serious problems with certain labels in the early 90s, Mattsson took a few years off and concentrated on the building of his own studio, as well as a number of other things. The first releases were Vision's "Till the End of Time" (1997), reissues of Mattsson’s "No Surrender", Vision’s debut album (1998), and Mattsson's solo album Obsession (1998). In January 2000 Lion Music released Alex Masi's In the Name of Bach and Matsson's Another Dimension.

Since this period, Lion Music has operated as a record label with regular releases and seen its roster of artists grow considerably, and they offer varied musical genres and styles. They are a participant in progressive and power metal circles. Lion Music has also branched out into other genres, such AOR/Melodic hard rock, fusion and classic hard rock. Lion Music has released several tribute albums to Jason Becker, Shawn Lane, Ritchie Blackmore, Jimi Hendrix, Uli Jon Roth, Faraz Anwar, and Gary Moore. In 2012, Lion Music announced that due to ongoing piracy they would stop signing new artists until the problem has been resolved.

Some artists who have signed for Lion Music (physical and digital releases): Joe McGurk, Vitalij Kuprij, Luca Di Gennaro, Luke Fortini, Alessio Berlaffa, Tony Cantisano, Patrick Hemer, Mathias Holm Klarin, B Gera, Michael Harris, Dave Martone, Milan Polak, Jonas Hornqvist, James Byrd. Joe Stump, Nicolas Waldo, Rusty Cooley, Daniele Liverani,

== Discography ==
=== Lars Eric Mattsson ===
- Can't Go On Without Your Love (4 track EP)(1987)
- Eternity (1988)
- No Surrender (1989)
- Electric Woodoo (aka The Exciter) (1991)
- Obsession (1998)
- Earthbound (2005)
- No Surrender+Live (2009) (20th Annivessary Reissue)
- Aurora Borealis: Concerto For Orchestra & Electric Guitar (2011)
- Epicentre (2013)
- Hot and Able (1983-85) (2014)
- Let Me Rock You (1984-87) (2014)
- Eternity - 25th Anniversary (2014)
- No Surrender - 25th Anniversary (2014)
- Songs From a Different Room (2015)
- Never Coming Home (4 track EP)(2016)
- Sand and Blood (2017)
- Vicky's Eyes (single) (2018)
- Into the Unknown (2019)
- Evolution (2023)
- Burning Bridges (2024)

=== Mattsson ===
- Another Dimension (2000)
- Power Games (2003)
- War (2005)
- Dream Child (2008)
- Tango (2010)

=== Lars Eric Mattsson's Vision ===
- Lars-Eric Mattsson's Vision (1992)(25th Anniversary Remaster released 2017)
- Till The End of Time (1997)(20th Anniversary Remix released 2017)
- The Best Of (2000)
- On The Edge (2004)
- II:1993(2017)
- Live+ (2017)

=== Condition Red ===
- Condition Red (2000) (Reissued new version in 2014)
- Condition Red 2 (2004) (Reissued new version in 2014)
- Tomorrow Never Knows (2015) (single, Beatles cover)
- Illusion of Truth (2016)

=== Book of Reflections ===
- Book of Reflections (2004)
- Chapter II: Unfold the Future (2006)
- Relentless Fighter (2012)

=== Astral Groove ===
- Astral Groove (1995)

=== Eli ===
- Darkness Will Fall (2008)

=== Roadhouse ===
- Them Changes (single) (2015)

=== Tributes ===
- Warmth in the Wilderness - A Tribute to Jason Becker (2001)
- Warmth in the Wilderness - A Tribute to Jason Becker II (2002)
- Beyond Inspiration - A Tribute to Uli Jon Roth (2001)
- Blackmore's CastIe - A Tribute to Deep Purple and Rainbow (2003)
- Give Us Moore - Gary Moore Tribute (2004)
- The Spirit Lives On - The Music of Jimi Hendrix Revisited vol. I (2004)
- The Spirit Lives On - The Music of Jimi Hendrix Revisited vol. II (2004)
- Shawn Lane Remembered vol I (2004)
- Embrace the Sun - Japan Earthquake Benefit Album (2011)
- Lion Music Presents: Johann Sebastian Bach - Interpretations (2015)
- Lion Music Presents: W. A. Mozart - Reincarnated (2015)
- Lion Music Presents: Antonio Vivaldi - A New Season (2016)
- Lion Music Presents: L.V. Beethoven - Ode to Perfection (2017)
- Lion Music Presents: G.F. Handel - Baroque Passion (2017)

=== Others ===
- "Various Artists - Dream Ballads (2001)
- Lalu - Oniric Metal (2005)
- Iron Mask - Shadow of the Red Baron (2010)

== See also ==
- List of record labels
