= A Life to Die For =

Studio album by Royal Hunt
- Released: 2013
- Genres: Progressive metal, power metal
- Length: 46:19

Royal Hunt chronology
Show Me How to Live (2011)	A Life to Die For (2013)	Devil's Dozen (2015)

A Life to Die For is the 12th studio album by Royal Hunt.

== Track listing ==
All songs by André Andersen.

1. Hell Comes Down from Heaven (9:27)
2. A Bullet's Tale (5:54)
3. Running Out of Tears (5:31)
4. One Minute Left to Live (5:49)
5. Sign of Yesterday (6:02)
6. Won't Trust, Won't Fear, Won't Beg (4:58)
7. A Life to Die For (8:38)

=== European Digipack Edition Bonus DVD – World Tour 2012 ===
1. Tour Kick-off (1:25)
2. Half Past Loneliness (7:49) - original from Show Me How to Live (2011)
3. Hard Rain's Coming (12:50)) - original from Show Me How to Live (2011)
4. Age Gone Wild (8:29) - original from Land of Broken Hearts (1992)
5. Far Away (6:21) - original from Far Away [EP] (1995) / Moving Target (1995)
6. Step by Step (5:59) - original from Moving Target (1995)
7. Interview with André Andersen (8:13)

- 2, 3: recorded live in Seoul, Korea
- 4: recorded live in Moscow, Russia
- 5: recorded live in Madrid, Spain
- 6: recorded live in Ekaterinburg, Russia

== Personnel ==
=== Band members ===
- André Andersen – keyboards, rhythm guitar, producer
- Jonas Larsen – lead guitar
- Allan Sørensen - drums
- D.C. Cooper – lead vocals
- Andreas Passmark – bass

=== Additional musicians ===
- Kenny Lubcke - backing vocals
- Alexandra Popova - backing vocals
- Michelle Raitzin - add. lead vocals (2)
- Jacob Kjær - guitar (3: solo)
- Soma Allpass - strings
- Christina Lund - strings
- Patricia Skovgaard - strings
- Christina Larsen - strings
- Erik Rosenqvist - brass, woodwinds
- Mads Kofoed - brass, woodwinds
- CV Company - choir

== Charts ==
Chart (2013)	Peak position
Japanese Albums (Oricon)	76
