= Steel Seal =

Italian Heavy Metal band

- Origin: Rome, Italy
- Genres: Neoclassical Metal, Power Metal
- Years active: 2003–present
- Label: Underground Symphony
- Members: Marco Valerio Zangani; Roberto Fasciani; Adriano Rossi; Luca Iovieno
- Past members: Bruno Baudo; D.C. Cooper (Guest); Andrea Orciuolo; Fabio Bernardi; Thomas Vikstrom (Guest)

Steel Seal is an Italian Neoclassical Power Metal band formed in 2003 by guitar player and main songwriter, Marco Valerio Zangani (Sacer Tiber), and vocalist Bruno Baudo, bassist Roberto Fasciani and the keyboardist Adriano Rossi. They produced their first demo in 2003, entitled Demo 2003, with computer-generated drums, which led to a recording contract with Italian label Underground Symphony in 2004.

Immediately after, internal band problems resulted in the departure of Baudo and Fasciani, and the arrival of Andrea Orciuolo, Fabio Bernardi and Luca Iovieno as the new drummer. With a hole in the vocalist spot, the band recruited world-renowned singer D.C. Cooper (Royal Hunt, Silent Force) as a session vocalist and By the Power of Thunder was released in Japan in December 2006 with Marquee/Avalon and worldwide in 2007 with Underground Symphony.

In 2008, the original members Fasciani and Rossi entered again to replace Orciuolo and Bernardi and this time around, Thomas Vikstrom (Candlemass, Brazen Abbot, Stormwind, Therion, etc.) handled vocal duties for the follow-up album, recording them in Argentina in January 2009. On one song, Vikstrom sings a duet with Italian vocalist Val Shieldon (Sigma, Oracle Sun), who also is credited for the backing vocals on many tracks. Redemption Denied was released worldwide by Underground Symphony in 2010.

With the same line-up, and the Italian vocalist Fabio Lione (Labyrinth, Rhapsody of Fire, Vision Divine, Angra) as a special guest, the band started to work on the following album. After a long and troubled preparation, The Lion's Den was released worldwide, in 2017: besides Lione, other guests are the guitarist Lorenzo Milone, as for the previous album, and Andrea De Paoli (Shadows of Steel, Labyrinth, Vision Divine) on the keyboards. The album enhanced the Neoclassical influences of the band (Beethoven, Verdi, Bach, Paganini) reproposing at the same time their typical mixture of Power Metal and Hard'n'Heavy Rock with lyrics often deriving from verses of famous British and American poets.

Subsequently, the same musicians, including Lione as a session vocalist again, recorded their fourth album Fireraiser, completed in 2020 at the Outer Sound Studios in Rome, like its three predecessors. On one song, Lione sings a duet with Italian vocalist Andrea Marchisio (Desdemona, Highlord); other guests are Milone, as usual, and Val Shieldon again, who sings a cover of Lost and Lonely Days by Warlord. After several delays and postponements due to accidents and administrative needs of the Label, the album has been released worldwide in april 2026 by Underground Symphony.

== Line-up ==
- Marco Valerio Zangani – Guitar
- Roberto Fasciani – Bass
- Adriano Rossi – Keyboards
- Luca Iovieno – Drums
- Fabio Lione – vocals (Guest)

== Former members ==
- Bruno Baudo – Vocals
- D.C. Cooper (Session) – Vocals
- Andrea Orciuolo – Bass
- Fabio Bernardi – Keyboards
- Thomas Vikstrom (Session) – Vocals

== Discography ==
=== Albums ===
- Demo 2003 (2003)
- By the Power of Thunder (2007)
- Redemption Denied (2010)
- The Lion's Den (2017)
- Fireraiser (2026)
