= Viewpark =

Coordinates: 55.8311°N 4.0542°W

Viewpark: Scottish Gaelic: Sealladh Pàirc; Scots: Viewpark
- Village
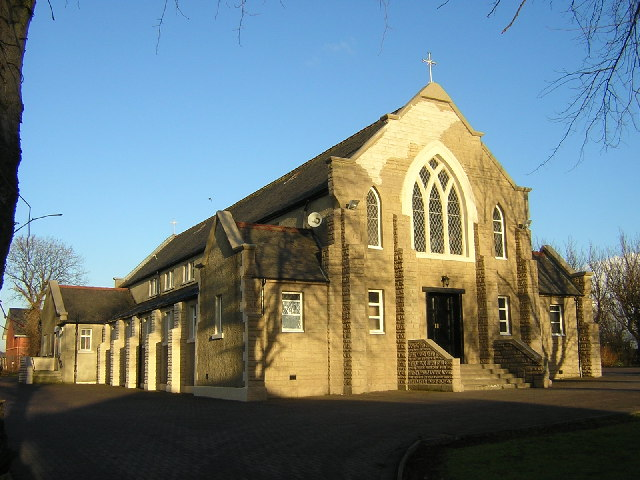
- St Columba's Roman Catholic Church

- Location within North Lanarkshire Viewpark (North Lanarkshire)
- Population: 15,830 (2020)
  - Density: 767.5/sq mi (1988/km2)
- OS grid reference: NS712612
  - Edinburgh: 35 mi (56 km)
- Community council: Thorniewood
- Council area: North Lanarkshire
- Lieutenancy area: Lanarkshire
- Country: Scotland
- Sovereign state: United Kingdom
- Post town: GLASGOW
- Postcode district: G71
- Dialling code: 01698
- Police: Scotland
- Fire: Scottish
- Ambulance: Scottish
- UK Parliament: Coatbridge, Chryston and Bellshill
- Scottish Parliament: Uddingston and Bellshill
- Councillors: Margaret Boyd - Scottish Labour; Helen Loughran - Scottish Labour; Barry McCluskey - Scottish National Party

Viewpark is an area in North Lanarkshire, Scotland. Situated immediately north-east of Uddingston (but on the other side of the M74 motorway), Viewpark is two kilometres (1 1/4 miles) west of Bellshill. It has an estimated population of 13,916 in 2016, a figure which also includes the smaller adjoining neighbourhoods of Birkenshaw, Bellziehill, Calderbraes, Fallside and Tannochside under the Thorniewood ward of the local council.

== History ==
Viewpark takes its name from a rural estate of that name, located just off New Edinburgh Road (which dates from the early 19th century and is thus 'new' only by comparison to Old Edinburgh Road which runs parallel further north, and today is part of the A721), near to which was the Viewpark Colliery, one of several mines dug in the area between Uddingston, Bellshill and the North Calder Water including Rosehall, Tannochside and Bredisholm, each of which had several pits. The workers were housed in scattered hamlets of miners' row cottages at Aitkenhead/Nackerty, Thorniewood, Tannochside, Muirpark and Cockhill, while other mansions in the area included Thornwood House (the site of which was north of Lynnhurst), St Enoch's Hall (near Banyan Crescent today) and Fallside House (today at Quarrybrae Gardens), the latter of which had a railway station on the Clydesdale Junction Railway from the 1870s to the 1950s (this line and the Caledonian main line, a short distance to the north, are both still in use to day, although there is no local station). A section of Roman road was found in the grounds of Fallside House in 1952. Other local industries included a brickworks and an oilworks.

Viewpark House mansion had a varied history: built in the 1830s to a design by noted architect John Baird, from the 1850s to the 1900s it was the home of the Addie family who controlled the local mines, who extended the estate to the limits of what would become the housing development, it then became a women's refuge, housed Belgian refugees of World War I and afterwards was divided into small individual apartments. The house, like others in the area, was demolished in the 1950s, but its grounds - Viewpark Gardens - are still present and used by the community as a park, allotments area and walled flower garden including a greenhouse, popular for wedding photography due to its backdrop of flora and original brickwork features. The gardens contained a group of life-sized sculptures, of which only two remain: Hercules and Athena. They were inspired by Aesop's fables and may be the work of Robert Forrest, whose sculpture was collected by another wealthy Lanarkshire coal merchant, Sir James Watson, for his estate at Earnock.

The post-World War II development was originally built to house miners and was erected quickly. Construction work on "The Scheme" began in the late 1940s with houses built in the area of Rowantree Avenue occupied around 1950, supplementing housing built adjacent and parallel to the "Top Road" (Old Edinburgh Road) where the local police station (the siren for which continued to sound practice air raid warnings into the 1960s) could be found, alongside the local football ground and opposite The Royal Oak Bar. Dominic's Shop (now long closed) alongside "The Lane" allowed quick access to the adjoining community and the local swing park on Douglas Street - named for the association with the Douglas Support estate the houses were built upon.

By 1956 the main thoroughfare in northern Viewpark, Laburnum Road, often referred to as "The Burma Road" in reference to its length, was well underway in its construction - most homes built off it were occupied by the early 1960s. Also in 1956, the local council set up what has now become Burnhead Bowling Club, along with an adjacent tennis court. A new church, Burnhead Parish Churchwas built at the eastern end of Laburnum Road opposite its junction with Burnhead Street. The other church in the area situated on Old Edinburgh Road is named Viewpark Parish Church (formed in 1933 from a union between the small Thornwood, Aitkenhead and Bothwellpark miners' churches) but would usually be considered to be in Tannochside rather than Viewpark.

A shopping complex was added in the centre of the new housing, aptly located in Market Place just off Burnhead Street, opposite the old rose gardens (now long gone, replaced by the Burnhead Community Centre, Viewpark Library, Liber8 sports complex and Viewpark Health Centre). Immediately behind this cluster of amenities is the Gala Day Park (Viewpark is one of the few villages in North Lanarkshire still to hold a Gala day each summer) where the local Miners Welfare club would organise their annual MayDay celebration where each child was presented with a box of Tunnock's cakes and fancies after competing in games and races.

The arrival of industries such as Ranco Motors and the Caterpillar Tractor Company (which opened its doors in 1957) created growth in the population, in combination with an influx of displaced families into the Viewpark area from the demolition of the miners' homes called "The Raws" in Tannochside, to release land for the erection of the Caterpillar factory. A similar fate befell the Miners' Rows at Cockhill, located due east of Laburnum Road; that land was utilised as a football field, along with an area of shops on the north side of Old Edinburgh Road. Kerr's Farm at Cockhill also disappeared and that land, which extended between Laburnum Road and the new A725 bypass road, was used to create Righead Industrial Estate which today separates Viewpark from Bellshill.

While the manufacturing industries moving to the area offset the decline of local mining, by 1973 Ranco had closed with the loss of over 400 jobs, and Caterpillar followed in 1987, with the abrupt announcement met with fury by the workforce (at that time 1,200, down from a peak of 2,700 in the 1960s) who staged a sit-in occupation at the factory lasting over 100 days, which ultimately did not save their jobs but at least secured improved redundancy terms. One of the strike leaders later became a prominent local councillor. 30 years later, the rebuilding of Tannochside Primary School, located next to where the factory had been, freed land for a small housing development which includes street names relating to Caterpillar and the protest. In addition to Righead Industrial Estate which contains several regional distribution centres for nationwide firms, there is still some local employment at the large Tannochside Business Park off Aitkenhead Road and at the Smurfit Kappa packaging factory, on Old Edinburgh Road in Tannochside. This commercial interest in the area is largely connected to the proximity of the M74 and M8 motorways connecting to the rest of Scotland easily, and this is also a significant factor in the growth of the local population in the early-21st century, following a period of economic struggles in the wake of the closure of Caterpillar and the likes of Ravenscraig steelworks. The former industrial sites have been built upon with new houses (mostly in Tannochside, while the built fabric of housing in Viewpark itself has remained largely the same apart from cosmetic improvements), with many of the residents commuting to Glasgow and elsewhere by car.

=== Viewpark Glen/Douglas Support Estate ===
Located to the north of the older housing within Viewpark is an area of woodland known locally as the "Viewpark Glen" but officially the Douglas Support Estate which historically extended across Uddingston, Bothwell, Hamilton, Coatbridge and Motherwell. Within the Glen lie the overgrown grounds of the grand Rosehall House (demolished 1939), Roman ruins such as a bridge over the North Calder Water, as well as tombs dating back centuries further.

In 2019, in view of its cultural and environmental importance, the local conservation group successfully applied for a £400,000 grant to purchase the undeveloped parts of the estate to preserve and enhance it for community recreational purposes. Some land to the north had been lost a few years earlier as part of the M8 motorway upgrade programme, while the construction of Strathclyde Business Park to the east had also encroached on the land and locals were aware of plans by the landowners to sell off the remainder to developers.

== Education ==
St Columba's Primary School was on Old Edinburgh Road. The original wooden structure was demolished after fire damage in the early 1960s. The replacement school building has since been knocked down and replaced by private housing.

St Catherine's Junior Secondary was built at the corner of Laburnum Road and New Edinburgh Road. It opened in the late 1960s after campaigning by local activists whose children had previously had to travel to Uddingston or Motherwell for secondary education.

St John Paul II Primary school, which sits on the corner of Laburnum Road and Old Edinburgh Road, was created as a result of the amalgamation of St Columba's and St Gabriel's primary schools in May 2006.

Tannochside Primary School and Nursery Class was opened on 23 August 2006 as the amalgamation of the old Tannochside Primary and Burnhead Primary and is situated on Douglas Street, at the end of Burnhead Street.

Fallside Secondary School is a small facility (housed in a building dating from 1911) for pupils with special educational and behavioural needs.

== Sport ==
Thorniewood United, a Scottish Junior Football Association club playing in the West Region, is based in the area at Robertson Park just off Old Edinburgh Road. Other local amateur football clubs include Viewpark United, playing in the Airdrie & Coatbridge Sunday AFL Premier Division, and Calderbraes FC.

Viewpark Boxing Club was founded in 2004, run by the Murphy family, locally-successful fighters (including Lawrence Murphy, a former WBU Middleweight Champion). The club is based at Burnhead Community Centre and other local facilities in the area.

== Notable people ==
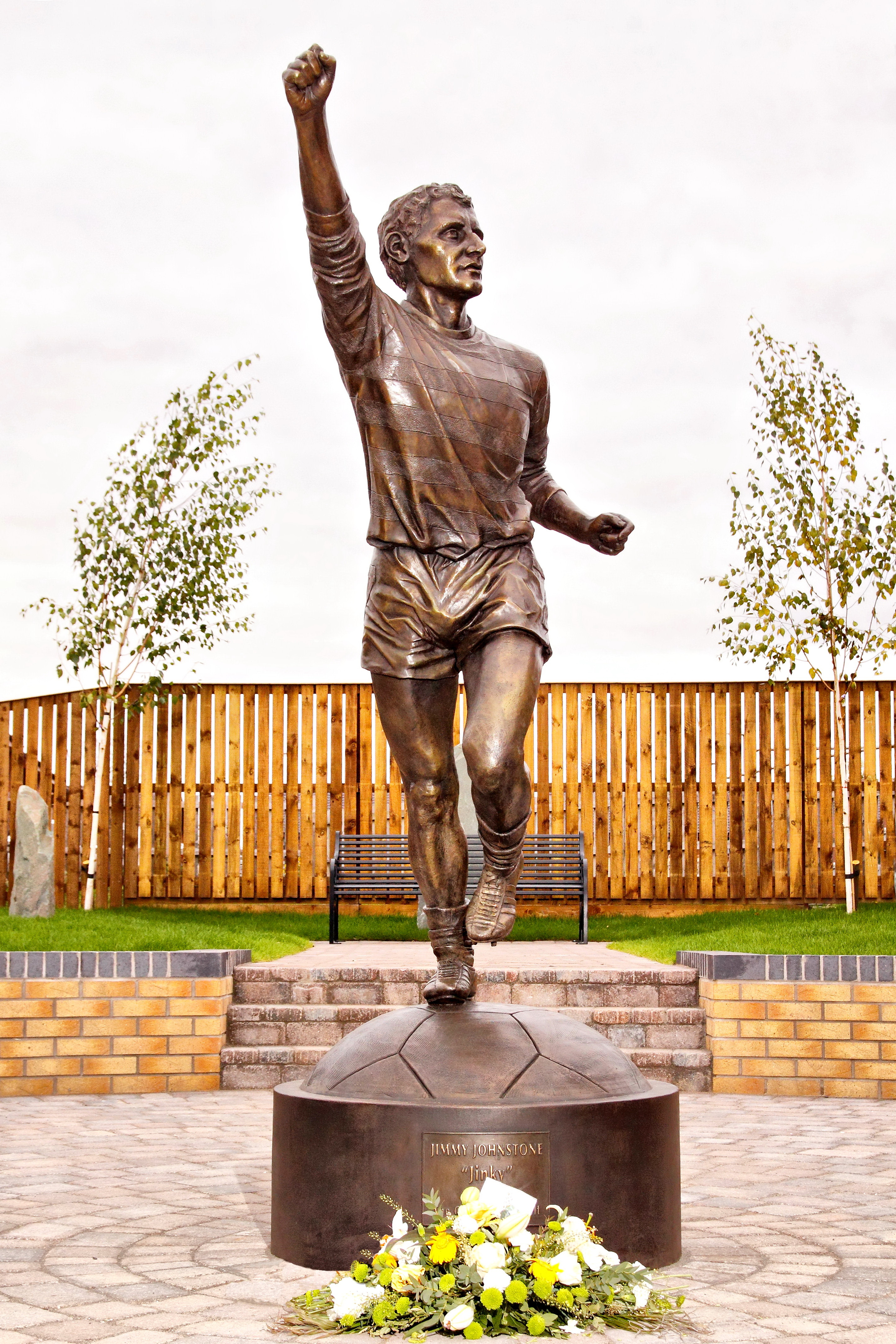
Jimmy Johnstone statue and memorial garden on Old Edinburgh Road, opened in 2011

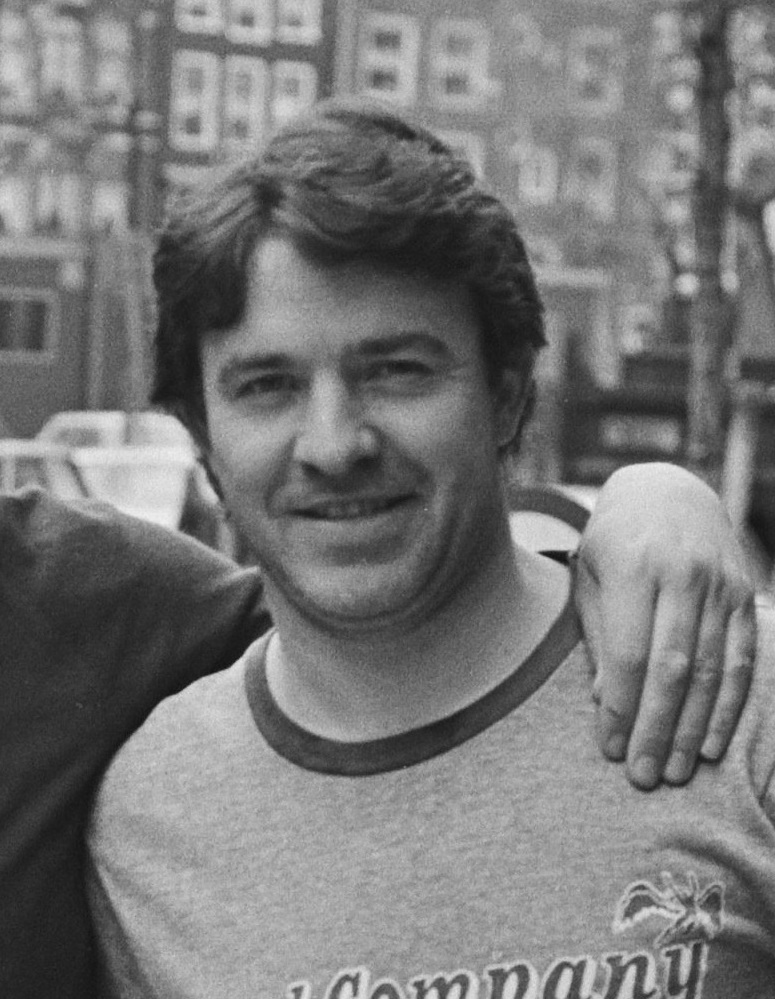
Photograph of John Robertson c.1980

- Margaret, Duchess of Douglas, was daughter of James Douglas of Mains (12th) and obtained her title by marriage to Archibald Douglas, 1st Duke of Douglas (part of the Red Douglas family, and a distant relation). Margaret and Archibald married late in life, did not have children, and the title of Duke of Douglas became extinct on Archibald's death. The estates of Douglas became the subject of a legal battle (known as the Douglas Cause) between Archibald Steuart (the Duke of Douglas' nephew) and the Duke of Hamilton, who inherited the remaining titles of Douglas. Margaret supported Archibald, who was granted the estates after appeal to the House of Lords. In her will, she left money to purchase lands to be called Douglas-Support.
- Sir James Hamilton, 2nd Baronet purchased Douglas Support in 1691 from Sir Archibald Hamilton, 1st Baronet and had plans drawn up for Rosehall Estate in the grounds of the area now known as Douglas Support, where he would live with his wife, Frances. He died childless on 15 March 1750 and the estate and baronetcy passed to his brother Hugh, who died unmarried in 1755. The title became extinct and Rosehall passed first to Hamilton’s half-sister, Margaret, and thereafter to her eldest son, Archibald Hamilton of Dalzell.
- General Sir Thomas Monteath Douglas succeeded to the estate of Douglas Support under the entail of the Duchess of Douglas, and took the name Douglas in addition to his own. He never returned to India, but was promoted in due course to be major-general on 20 June 1854, lieutenant-general on 18 March 1856, and full general on 9 April 1865. In March 1865 he was made a Knight Commander of the Order of the Bath in recognition of his long services during the early years of the century. He died at Stonebyres in Lanarkshire in October 1868.
- Footballer Jimmy Johnstone, affectionately known as 'Jinky', played for Celtic and the Scotland national team and was born and lived in Viewpark throughout his life. A memorial garden containing a statue of Johnstone was opened in 2011 in the grounds of the former St. Columba's Primary School, which he had attended.
- Footballer and assistant manager, John Robertson was a Scottish professional footballer. He provided the assisting cross for Trevor Francis to score the only goal when Nottingham Forest won the 1979 European Cup Final. A year later he scored when Forest retained the trophy 1-0 this time against Hamburger SV. At Forest he also won promotion from the 1976-77 Football League Second Division, the 1977-78 Football League First Division, the UEFA Super Cup, two Football League Cups, the 1978 FA Charity Shield and the Anglo-Scottish Cup. He also played for the full Scotland national football team, scoring the winning goal against England in 1981 and against New Zealand in the 1982 FIFA World Cup. From 2000–2005, he was the assistant manager at Celtic, serving under former teammate at Nottingham Forest, Martin O'Neill. He then followed O'Neill to Aston Villa again as assistant manager, which was to prove as his last major role at time of writing, between 2006 and 2010. In 1997, FourFourTwo magazine declared that John Robertson was 63rd in the 100 greatest footballers of all time. He was also voted No 1 Nottingham Forest player of all time, forcing Stuart Pearce into second place, in a 2005 poll run by fans. Robertson retained this position in 2015 in a poll to celebrate Forest's 150th anniversary.
- Kevin Budinauckas is a football goalkeeper who played for Stenhousemuir, Partick Thistle, Clyde, Brechin City on loan and Stranraer in the senior game. He also had a couple of spells in junior football at Wishaw and Linlithgow Rose, Cumnock, Pollok and Armadale.
- Charles "Chic" McSherry OBE (born 22 November 1958) is a Scottish rock guitarist, songwriter, author and businessman. Chic, although born in Lanark, grew up in Viewpark. In his music career, he has written five studio albums with Doogie White and the band La Paz. In his business career, he is on the Board of Directors of six UK companies, one U.S. Company and one Mexican company. He has also written two crime fiction novels published by Wild Wolf Publishing He was awarded Officer Of The Order Of The British Empire (OBE) in the Queen's Birthday Honours List in 2018
