= Crimson Dawn (band) =

Italian metal band

Crimson Dawn is an Italian doom metal band. They have released four albums, three of which on Punishment 18 Records.

The project was founded in 2005 by Dario Beretta (Drakkar) and Emanuele Rastelli (Crown of Autumn). Following a demo recording, the band was not picked up by a record label and went on hiatus until 2008. Rastelli was not a part of the restart of Crimson Dawn, but Beretta recruited Antonio Pecere (Betoken) on vocals as well as four instrument players. This new lineup completed Crimson Dawn's first album in 2012.

== Discography ==
- In Strange Aeons... (2013)
- Chronicles of an Undead Hunter (2017)
- Inverno (2020)
- It Came from the Stars (2023)
