= Message to God =

Single by Royal Hunt

from the album Paradox
- Released: 1997
- Genre: Progressive metal
- Length: 8:35
- Label: Majestic Entertainment
- Songwriter: André Andersen
- Producer: André Andersen

Royal Hunt singles chronology
"Single 1988" (1988)	"Message to God" (1997)

Message to God is a single released to promote the Paradox album by the Danish progressive metal band Royal Hunt. The song "Final Lullaby" appears as a bonus track on most current editions of the album Paradox. There is an acoustic version of the song "Far Away" in the Japanese versions of this single.

== Track listing ==
All songs written by André Andersen.

1. "Message to God" (Radio Edit) – 4:40
2. "The Final Lullaby" – 3:55
3. "Far Away" (Acoustic) (Japanese bonus track)

== Personnel ==
- André Andersen – keyboards and guitars
- D. C. Cooper – lead and backing vocals
- Jacob Kjaer - guitars
- Steen Mogensen – bass guitar
- Allan Sorensen – drums
