= Oracle Sun =

Italian metal band

Oracle Sun is an Italian progressive power metal band. They have released two albums.

The band was started by vocalist Val Shieldon (Sigma), guitarists Emy Manuguerra (Angel Grace) and Fabrizio Marnik (Seven Gates), bassist Alessandro Cola (Shining Fury) and drummer Frank Andiver (Labÿrinth, Wonderland) and their debut album Deep Inside (2005) got a release from Scarlet Records. The second album was released by Volcano and by Underground Symphony.

== Discography ==
- Deep Inside (2005)
- Machine Man (2020)
