= Show Me How to Live =

Show Me How to Live may refer to:

- "Show Me How to Live" (song), a 2003 song by Audioslave
- Show Me How to Live (album), a 2011 album by Royal Hunt
