= II (Seven Thorns album) =

Studio album by Seven Thorns
- Released: 19 January 2013
- Recorded: 2012–2013
- Genre: Power metal
- Label: Sonic Revolution
- Producers: Peter Brander and Tommy Hansen

Seven Thorns chronology
Return to the Past (2010)	II (2013)	Symphony of Shadows (2018)

II is the second album recorded by Seven Thorns. It was released on 19 January 2013 independently, and was later re-released on 1 February 2014 by the record label Sonic Revolution. The chorus melody of the song Justice is based on a Danish church psalm with music composed by C. Chr. Hoffmann in 1878.

Markus Endres of Metal.de rated it a 7 out of 10.

== Track listing ==
No.	Title	Length
1.	"Intro"	1:22
2.	"Eye of the Storm"	4:42
3.	"Revelation"	4:55
4.	"Queen of Swords"	4:21
5.	"Justice"	5:20
6.	"Night of Temptation"	4:51
7.	"Redemption"	5:21
8.	"You're not Brave (I'f You're not Scared)"	5:19
9.	"A Joker's Game"	5:55
10.	"After the Storm"	0:45
11.	"Mamma Mia (Originally by ABBA)" (Bonus track)	4:37

== Personnel ==
- Lars Borup - Drums
- Gabriel Tuxen - Guitars, backing vocals
- Christian B. Strøjer - Guitars
- Asger W. Nielsen - Keyboards, backing vocals
- Nicolaj Marker - Bass
- Erik "EZ" Blomkvist - Lead vocals

=== Guest musicians ===
- André Andersen (Royal Hunt) - Keyboard solo on Eye of the Storm.
- David Henriksson - Additional lead vocals on Redemption.

=== Production ===
- Peter Brander - Recording and mixing
- Tommy Hansen - Mastering
