= Henrik Brockmann =

Danish heavy metal singer

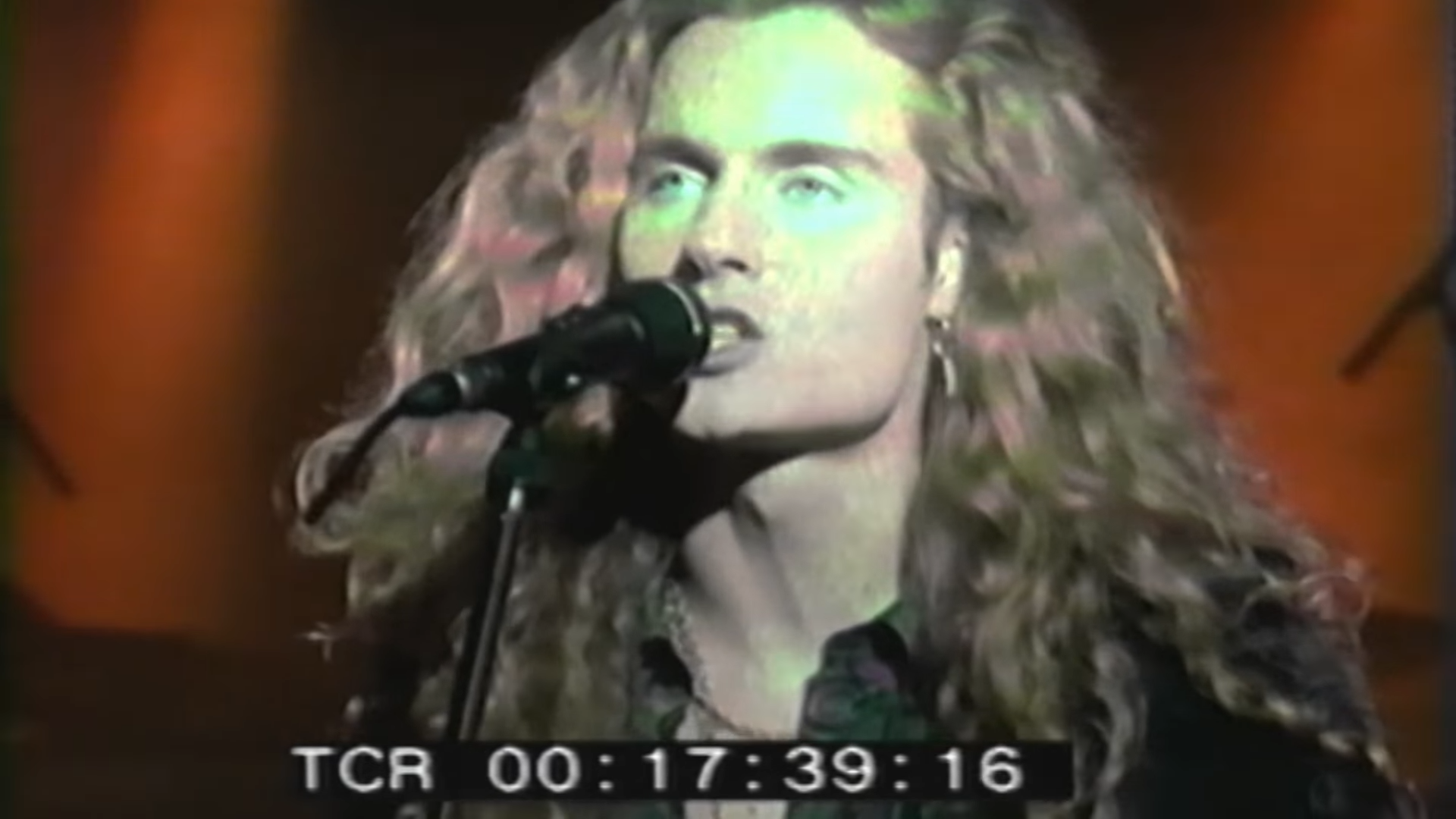
Brockmann with Royal Hunt in 1992.

Henrik Brockmann (born Henrik Aalborg Brockmann; 24 November 1967) is a Danish heavy metal singer. He started singing at the age of 13 in local school bands. He released his first album 1992 with the Danish band Royal Hunt and was replaced 1994 by DC Cooper.

== Discography ==
Lead vocals on:

=== Royal Hunt ===
- Land of Broken Hearts (1992)
- The Maxi EP (1993)
- Clown in the Mirror (1994)

=== Evil Masquerade ===
- Welcome To The Show (2004)
- Theatrical Madness (2005)

=== Missing Tide ===
- Follow The Dreamer (2009)

=== N-Tribe ===
- Root'N'Branch (2019)

=== Timeless Fairytale ===
- A Story To Tell (2024)

Additional backing vocals on:

- Andre Andersen – Changing skin (1998)
- Andre Andersen – "1000 miles away" (single) (1998)
- Cornerstone – Arrival (2000)
- Royal Hunt – Collision Course... Paradox 2 (2008)
- Royal Hunt – X (2010)
- Stamina – Two of a Kind (2010)
