= Devil's Dozen (album) =

Studio album by Royal Hunt
- Released: 21 August 2015
- Genre: Progressive metal, power metal
- Length: 44:45
- Label: Frontiers Music Srl

Royal Hunt chronology
A Life to Die For (2013)	Devil's Dozen (2015)

Devil's Dozen is the thirteenth studio album by power/progressive metal band Royal Hunt. This was released on 21 August 2015 via Frontiers Music Srl.

== Track listing ==
All songs are written by Andre Andersen.

1. So Right So Wrong (7:21)
2. May You Never (Walk Alone) (7:29)
3. Heart on a Platter (6:52)
4. A Tear in the Rain (5:49)
5. Until the Day (6:36)
6. Riches to Rags (5:45)
7. Way Too Late (6:37)
8. How Do You Know (bonus track)(3:16)

== Personnel ==
Production and performance credits are adapted from the album liner notes.

Royal Hunt

- D.C. Cooper - vocals
- Andre Andersen - keyboards
- Andreas Passmark - bass
- Jonas Larsen - guitars
- Andreas Habo Johansson - drums

Additional musicians

- Andreas "Habo" Johansson - drums
- Kenny Lubcke - backing vocals
- Alexandra Popova - backing vocals
- Christina Lund - strings
- Patricia Skovgaard - strings
- Christina Larsen - strings
- Henrik Sorensen - brass/woodwinds
- Mads Kofoed - brass/woodwinds
