= Fear (Royal Hunt album) =

Studio album by Royal Hunt
- Released: 15 October 1999
- Genre: Progressive metal
- Length: 49:07
- Label: SPV (Europe); Magna Carta (USA); Pony Canyon (Japan)
- Producer: André Andersen

Royal Hunt chronology
Paradox (1997)	Fear (1999)	The Mission (2001)

Professional ratings
Review scores
Source	Rating
Allmusic	1.5/5 stars
Rock Hard	8/10 stars
MetalCrypt	3.5/5 stars

Fear is the fifth studio album released by Danish progressive metal band Royal Hunt, It is the debut studio album from John West on vocals.

== Track listing ==
All songs written by André Andersen.

1. "Fear" – 9:38
2. "Faces of War" – 6:56
3. "Cold City Lights" – 5:23
4. "Lies" – 7:44
5. "Follow Me" – 6:22
6. "Voices" – 5:20
7. "Sea of Time" – 7:44

== Personnel ==
- André Andersen – keyboards and rhythm guitar
- John West – vocals
- Steen Mogensen – bass guitar
- Jacob Kjaer – lead guitar
- Allan Sørensen – drums

Choirs

- Kenny Lubcke – backing vocals
- Henrik Brockmann – backing vocals

== Production ==
- Mixing – Lars Overgaard and Royal Hunt
