= Aphasia (Japanese band) =

Japanese rock band

- Origin: Japan
- Genres: Heavy metal, hard rock
- Years active: 1994–present
- Members: Sion; Sumiko 'Goe' Ishikawa; Junko 'Jun' Takeda
- Past members: Yumi Kondoh; Kyoko 'Kyon' Morita
- Website: www.aphasiajpn.com - current website. aphasia.jp - past website

Aphasia is an all-female heavy metal/hard rock band from Japan. Their latest release is Mirage 2018.

== History ==
The band was formed in 1994. and prior to their debut album, they recorded three demos. The original line-up consisted of Satoko "Ten" Mizoshita on guitars, Yumi "Luka" Kondou on vocals, Junko "Jun" Takeda on drums and Junko Suzuki on bass. Together, they recorded a three-track demo in 1995. Ten and Suzuki would leave the band soon after.

After a few line-up changes, Sumiko "Goe" Ishikawa would join the band in 1997 as their guitarist, and Kyoko "Kyon" Morita joined as their bassist that same year. This same line-up recorded two demos in 1997 and 1998, as well as the band's debut album Mirage on the Ice, in 1999. Aside from the band members, Mirage on the Ice also counted with the participation of keyboardist Noriko Takahashi, who would appear on future released by the band.

Prior to the album's release, the band contributed to the "Women's Power First" compilation, released in 1998 by the label Flying Cat. By this time, the band was a well-known presence in the Tokyo club scene, and at one point opened for Keiko Terada.

Aphasia eventually release their second full-length album "Wings of Fire" in 2001. This album showcases a slightly different line-up, with Saki replacing Kyon on bass duties.

Their next album, Labyrinth in my Heart, was released in 2003, and once more there was a line-up change as Sho replaces Saki on bass duties. This continues onto their next album Wild and Innocent, released in 2004. Notably, in this album Aphasia bring in a session musician, keyboardist Manabu Kokado.

In 2005, Aphasia record and release their first EP, Mirage 2005, essentially a self-cover release, consisting of re-recordings of earlier tracks by the then current line-up. This release sees the return bassist Saki, as well as the addition of the fifth member, as keyboardist Noriko Takahashi, now nicked "Maya" joins the band.

The fifth full-length album, Gambler, was released in 2006. Despite Maya having joined the band the prior year, the album was recorded with session keyboardists (Maki, Hitoshi Endo and Manabu Kokado) instead of Maya. In the same year, Aphasia also recorded a live video, Live at the Live Station, where a line-up consisting of Jun (drums), Goe (guitars), Saki (bass), Maya (keyboards) and Luka (vocals) play two tracks.

Three years later, the band releases their second EP, Sweet Illusion. It would be their last release for eight years. Notably, it was their first release recorded as a trio, with a line-up solely consisting of longtime members Jun (drums), Goe (guitars) and Luka (vocals).

In 2015, longtime vocalist Luka leaves and is replaced by newcoming vocalist Sion. In 2016, they are joined by bassist Ken, from the band WOLF, the band's first male member. This line-up goes on to record and release the band's sixth full release, Ever-lasting blue. Essentially a comeback album, Aphasia enlist former band member and longtime contributor, keyboardist Noriko "Maya" Takahashi. In addition André Andersen, multi-instrumentalist and composer of Royal Hunt fame, plays on two tracks: The opening instrumental "Into the fire" (which he composed) and the following track "CRUSH&BURN", a re-recording of a track previously released on the Sweet Illusion EP. Additionally, the 9th track, "Eien no Kodoku", is a cover of the second opening track for the 1992 anime Tekkaman Blade, originally performed and composed by Yumiko Kosaka, with lyrics by Mikako Sato.

In 2018, the band revisits the concept of an EP consisting of re-recorded tracks by the then current line-up, and release their third EP, Mirage 2018. Ken left the band the prior year, leaving the bassist slot once more vacant in Aphasia. As such, the EP was recorded as a trio composed of Jun (drums, backing vocals), Goe (guitars, backing vocals) and Sion (vocals). In addition, Noriko Takahashi once more fills in as keyboardist for this release, and the bassist slot is filled by Ryosuke "Tsui" Matsui.

== Influences ==
The band has listed Def Leppard, TNT, Mr. Big, Dokken, Ozzy Osbourne, Europe, Michael Schenker Group, Scorpions, Night Ranger, Fair Warning, Show-Ya, The Carpenters and Cheap Trick as influences, alongside other bands. They have also said some J-Pop bands serves as inspiration, as well as classical music.

== Line-up ==
current

- Jun - Drums (1995–present)
- Sumiko "Goe" Ishikawa - Guitars (1997–present)
- Sion - Vocals (2015–present)

former

- Junko - Bass (1995)
- Ten - Guitars (1995)
- Luka - Vocals (1995–2015)
- Kyoko "Kyon" Morita - Bass (1997-?)
- Miu - Bass (1999-?)
- Saki - Bass (2001)
- Sho - Bass (2002-?)
- Maya - Keyboards (2005-?)
- Ken - Bass (2016–2017)

== Discography ==
- Mirage on the Ice (1999)
- Wings of Fire (2001)
- Labyrinth in My Heart (2003)
- Wild and Innocent (2004)
- Mirage (2005; EP)
- Gambler (2006)
- Sweet Illusion (2009; EP)
- Ever-lasting Blue (2017)
- Mirage 2018 (2018; EP)
