= Betoken =

Italian metal band

Betoken is an Italian power metal band. They have released five albums.

== Discography ==
- The Gate of Nothing (2004)
- Dead Soul Insomnia (2006)
- Venom Empire (2009)
- Days of the Apocalypse (2011)
- Beyond Redemption (2014)

== Other projects ==
Singer Antonio Pecere also did the vocals for the band Komaday who released one album, Ghost and The Wiseman in 2005; Deimos, Sigma, Crimson Dawn and Black Stars.
