= 2006 Live =

Live album released in 2006 by The Who

Live album by Royal Hunt
- Released: 8 December 2006
- Recorded: Recorded at St. Petersburg's Music Hall, 2 November 2005
- Genre: Progressive metal
- Length: 99:07
- Label: Frontiers
- Producer: André Andersen

Royal Hunt chronology
Paper Blood (2005)	2006 Live (2006)	Collision Course... Paradox 2 (2008)

2006 Live is a live album by the Danish progressive metal band Royal Hunt, released on CD and DVD by Frontiers Records in 2006. It is the only official live recording with singer John West.

== Track listing ==
All songs written by André Andersen.

=== Disc One ===
1. "Paper Blood" – 06:26
2. "Time" – 03:23
3. "The Mission" – 06:36
4. "Never Give Up" – 05:17
5. "Can't Let Go" – 04:40
6. "Last Goodbye" – 06:08
7. "Follow Me" – 02:39
8. "Cold City Lights" – 08:51

=== Disc Two ===
1. "Martial Arts" (Instrumental) – 02:41
2. "Surrender" – 05:15
3. "Running Wild" – 04:58
4. "Far Away" – 05:47
5. "Lies" – 07:49
6. "Wasted Time" – 06:29
7. "Message to God" – 08:24
8. "Epilogue" – 09:08
9. "Long Way Home" (Acoustic studio track) – 04:39

== Personnel ==
- André Andersen – keyboards
- John West – vocals
- Marcus Jidell – guitars
- Per Schelander – bass
- Kenneth Olsen – drums
- Maria McTurk – backing vocals
