= 1996 (Royal Hunt album) =

Live album by Royal Hunt
- Released: 1996
- Recorded: 1996
- Venue: Kaninhoken Hall, Tokyo, Japan; IMP Hall Osaka, Japan
- Studio: Mirand Studio, Denmark
- Genre: Progressive metal, hard rock
- Length: 110:53
- Label: Teichiku Records
- Producer: André Andersen

Royal Hunt chronology
Moving Target (1995)	1996 (1996)	Paradox (1997)

1996 is the first live album by the Danish progressive metal band Royal Hunt with singer D.C. Cooper. It was recorded during Royal Hunt tour in Japan promoting the album Moving Target and came out together with a VHS video of the show. The Japanese version of the album comes with three Royal Hunt guitar picks inside it.

== Track listing ==
All songs written by André Andersen, except where noted.

=== Disc one ===
1. "Flight" – 6:26
2. "1348" – 4:55
3. "Wasted Time" – 4:25
4. "Stay Down" – 4:28
5. "On the Run" – 3:45
6. "Stranded" – 5:16
7. "Keyboard Solo" (Instrumental) – 2:35
8. "Martial Arts" (Instrumental) – 4:03
9. "Far Away" – 5:43
10. "Last Goodbye" – 5:42
11. "Land of Broken Hearts" – 5:26
12. "Makin' a Mess" – 3:59

=== Disc Two ===
1. "Clown in the Mirror" – 5:23
2. "Guitar Solo" (Instrumental) (Jacob Kjaer) – 2:53
3. "Step by Step" – 4:14
4. "Drum & Bass Solo" (Instrumental) (Kenneth Olsen, Steen Mogensen) – 4:23
5. "Running Wild" – 6:26
6. "Epilogue" – 9:11
7. "Age Gone Wild" – 4:47
8. "Ten to Life" – 5:13
9. "Legion of the Damned" – 4:48
10. "Kingdom Dark" – 6:30
11. "Time" – 6:51
12. "Restless" (Studio track) (Japanese bonus track)

== Personnel ==
- D.C. Cooper – vocals
- André Andersen – keyboards, guitars
- Jacob Kjaer – guitars, backing vocals
- Steen Mogensen – bass, backing vocals
- Kenneth Olsen – drums

with

- Maria McTurk – backing vocals
- Lise Hansen – backing vocals

== Additional Info ==
- Mixed and mastered at Medley Studio, Denmark by Lars Overgaard and Royal Hunt
- Design & Artwork by Martin Burridge Design, Denmark
