= John West (musician) =

American vocalist and guitarist

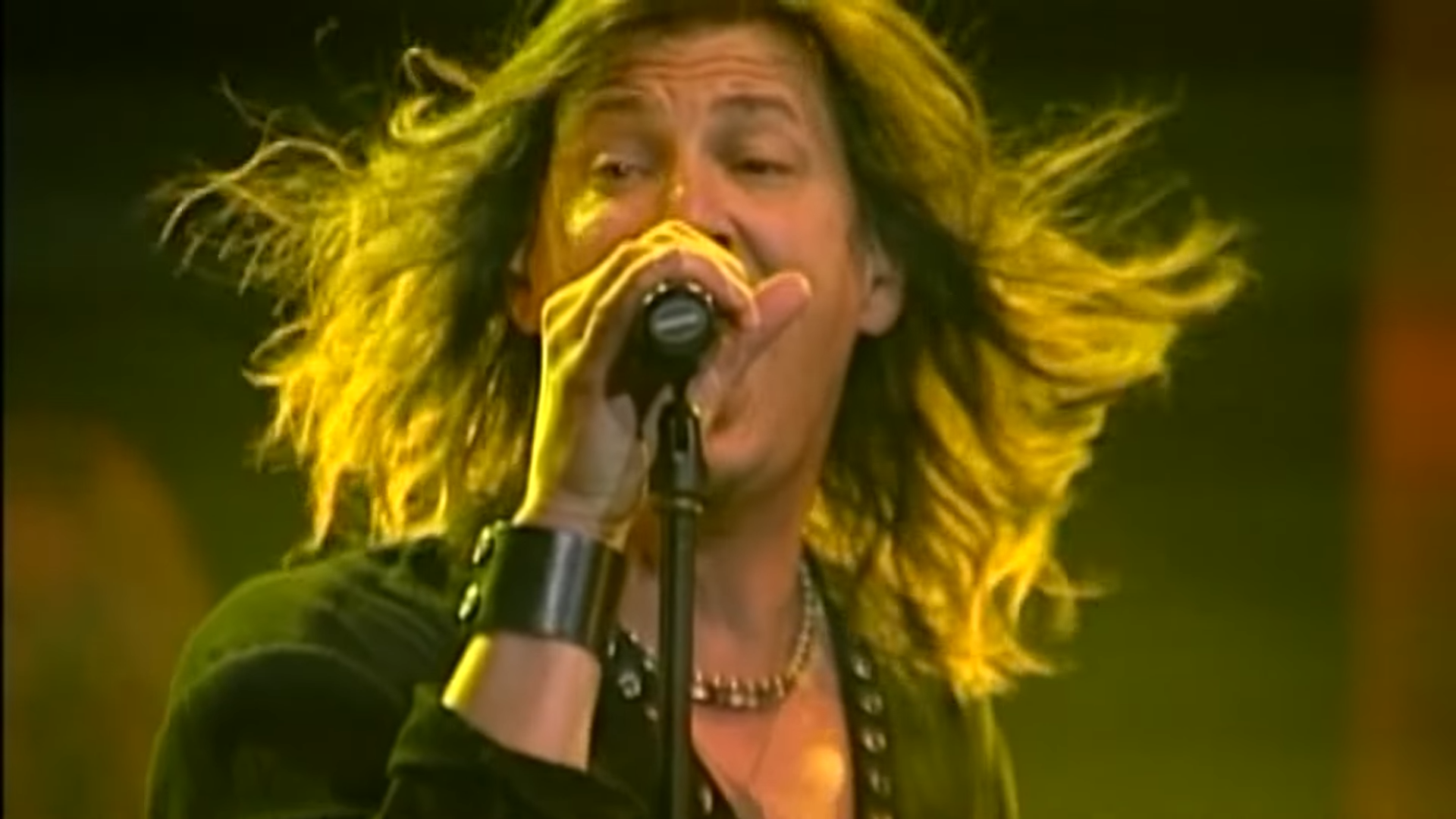
- West performing with Royal Hunt in 2006

Background information
- Born: October 29, 1964; Syracuse, New York, U.S.
- Genres: Hard rock, heavy metal, progressive metal, neoclassical metal, blues rock
- Instruments: Vocals, guitar
- Years active: 1986–present
- Labels: Shrapnel, Frontiers
- Formerly of: Diamond, Sage's Recital, Mythodea, Artlantica, Destiny, Feinstein, Badlands, Sun Red Sun, Artension, Lynch Mob, Royal Hunt
- Website: johnwestmusic.com

John Michael West (born October 29, 1964) is an American vocalist, best known as the lead vocalist of Artension and the former lead vocalist of Royal Hunt.

== Early career ==
Prior to his joining Royal Hunt in 1998, West contributed vocals to a variety of projects. His recording career began in 1986 as the singer of Diamond. Later, he sang for Destiny, who released the four-song demo Side By Side in 1989. He had brief stints replacing Ray Gillen in both Badlands and Sun Red Sun in the mid-1990s, also lending his voice to Cozy Powell's final solo album, Especially For You during this period. In lesser known projects, he also sang one track on Marc Ferrari's solo album Guest List in 1995, also handling vocal duties on self-titled albums by Many Moons and Rider the following year.

== Artension ==
In 1996, West joined neoclassical power/progressive metal group Artension, who released their debut album Into The Eye of the Storm the same year. The band went on to release seven studio albums from 1996 to 2004. The group's second album, Phoenix Rising, is especially noted for West's wide-ranging vocal contributions. West and the band regrouped in 2016 with the intention of releasing a new album.

== Royal Hunt ==
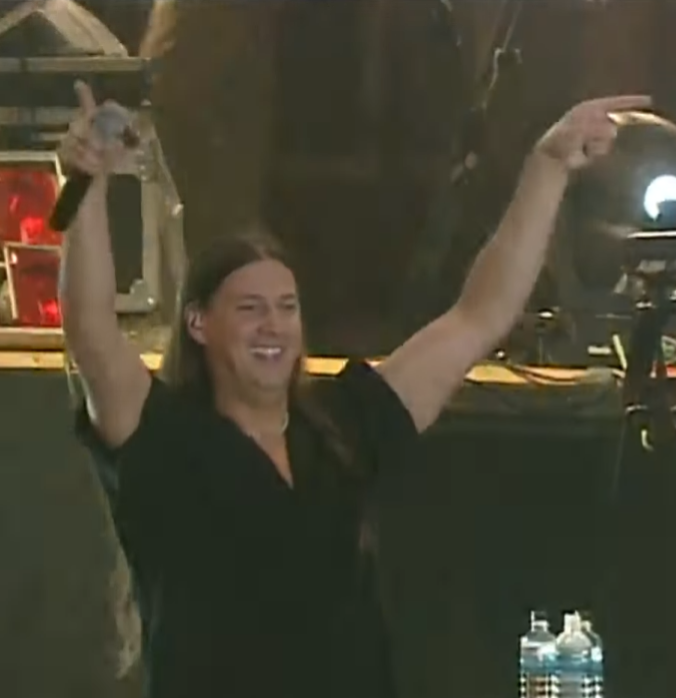
West performing with Royal Hunt in 2002.

In 1998, West replaced D.C. Cooper as the lead singer of Royal Hunt, remaining with the group until 2007. He recorded four studio albums, one live album, and one EP with the group. West's ten-year tenure as the band's vocalist was the longest uninterrupted tenure of any singer in Royal Hunt's 25-year history until Cooper rejoined the band in 2011.

== Solo career ==
West has released four albums under his own name, which have featured a wide variety of contributors. His first two, Mind Journey (1997) and Permanent Mark (1998), adopted a neoclassical metal style with many extended instrumental sections. After concentrating on Royal Hunt for a few years, West returned in 2002 with the concept album Earth Maker, which showcased a more song-oriented writing style while still retaining much of his previous sound. Finally, in 2006, West released Long Time No Sing, which is more of a blues-rock album. The latter disc features West playing guitar as well as singing.

== Post-Royal Hunt ==
Since departing from Royal Hunt in 2007, West has lent his voice to a wide variety of projects. He appeared as the lead singer for Bosnian guitarist Emir Hot on his debut album Sevdah Metal in 2008 and keyboardist Mistheria's solo effort "Dragon Fire" in 2010. In 2012, he sang on symphonic metal band Mythodea's self-titled debut album, and in 2013, he collaborated with former Artension guitarist Roger Staffelbach to form Artlantica, an Artension-styled band that went on to release an album called Across The Seven Seas. He also appeared on Chilean progpower band Delta's fifth album, The End of Philosophy, singing a duet with the band's regular vocalist, Felipe del Valle, on the track "Bringers of Rain". After del Valle left the band in 2014, West recorded new versions of Delta's songs "New Philosophy" and "Regrets" as singles and also appeared with the band on the Progressive Nation at Sea cruise.

West has also toured as the singer for Uli Jon Roth's band and Ronnie James Dio/Ritchie Blackmore tribute band Black Knights Rising. He also collaborated with Danish guitar virtuoso Niels Vejlyt on a project called Sage's Recital, which put out their self-titled debut album in 2013 and followup The Winter Symphony in 2016.

== Discography ==
=== Solo work ===
- Mind Journey (1997)
- Permanent Mark (1998)
- Earth Maker (2002)
- Long Time... No Sing (2006)
- Johnny and Lonnie – "Greatest Misses" (2006)
- Days of Destiny (2022)

=== Collaborations ===
With Artension

- Into the Eye of the Storm (1996)
- Phoenix Rising (1997)
- Forces of Nature (1999)
- Machine (2000)
- Sacred Pathways (2001)
- New Discovery (2002)
- Future World (2004)

With Rider

- Rider (1996)

With Royal Hunt

- Fear (1999)
- Intervention (2001)
- The Watchers (2001)
- The Mission (2001)
- On The Mission 2002 (2002)
- Eyewitness (2003)
- Paper Blood (2005)
- 2006 Live (2006)
- Royal Hunt 2006 (DVD; 2006)

With Ten Man Push

- Ten Man Push (2007)
- Playin' In The Dirt (2009)
- Branded (2013)

With Cozy Powell

- Especially For You (1999)

With Feinstein

- Third Wish (2004)

With Emir Hot

- Sevdah Metal (2008)

With Mythodea

- Mythodea (2012)

With Sage's Recital

- Sage's Recital (2013)
- The Winter Symphony (2016)

With Artlantica

- Across The Seven Seas (2013)

Guest Appearances

- Marc Ferrari – Guest List (1995)
- Sun Red Sun – Sun Red Sun (1994)
- Marilyn Manson — Mechanical Animals (1998)
- James Murphy – Feeding The Machine (1999)
- Iron Maiden Tribute – Slave To The Power (2000)
- Savatage – Poets and Madmen (2001)
- Roger Staffelbach's Angel of Eden – "The End of Never" (2007)
- Mistheria – "Dragon Fire" (2010)
- Delta – "The End of Philosophy" (2013)
- American Mafia – "Rock 'N' Roll Hit Machine" (2014)
- Forces United – II (2015)
- Crimson Cry – Lost Reality (2017)

Other releases

- Many Moons – "Many Moons" (1996)
