= Collision Course... Paradox 2 =

Collision Course... Paradox II

Studio album by Royal Hunt
- Released: 14 March 2008
- Recorded: Northpoint Productions, Denmark
- Genre: Progressive metal
- Length: 51:35
- Label: Frontiers
- Producer: André Andersen

Royal Hunt chronology
2006 Live (2006)	Collision Course... Paradox II (2008)	X (2010)

Collision Course... Paradox II is the ninth studio album released by the band Royal Hunt and the first to feature American singer Mark Boals.

== Track listing ==
All songs written by André Andersen.

1. "Principles of Paradox" - 5:42
2. "The First Rock" - 4:47
3. "Exit Wound" - 6:29
4. "Divide and Reign" - 5:25
5. "High Noon at the Battlefield" - 3:57
6. "The Clan" - 4:39
7. "Blood In Blood Out" - 6:04
8. "Tears of the Sun" - 6:00
9. "Hostile Breed" - 5:07
10. "Chaos A.C." - 3:25

== Personnel ==
- André Andersen – keyboards and guitar
- Mark Boals – vocals
- Marcus Jidell – guitars, cello
- Allan Sørensen – drums
- Per Schelander – bass

Guests:

- Kenny Lubcke – backing vocals
- Maria McTurk – backing vocals
- Ian Perry - backing vocals
- Doogie White - backing vocals
- Henrik Brockmann - backing vocals
- Soma Allpass - backing vocals, cello
- Michelle Raitzin - backing vocals
- Patricia Skovgaard - violin
- Erik Rosenqvist - woodwinds, accordion

== Charts ==
Chart (2008)	Peak position
Japanese Albums (Oricon)	46
