= Symphony of Shadows =

Studio album by Seven Thorns
- Released: 14 December 2018
- Recorded: 2017–2018
- Genre: Power metal
- Length: 41:02
- Label: Might Music; Rubicon (Japan)
- Producer: Tue Madsen

Seven Thorns chronology
II (2013)	Symphony of Shadows (2018)

Symphony of Shadows is the third studio album by Danish power metal band Seven Thorns.

== Track listing ==
No.	Title	Length
1.	"Evil Within"	4:58
2.	"Black Fortress"	4:29
3.	"Beneath a Crescent Moon"	4:51
4.	"Ethereal (I'm Still Possessed)"	5:16
5.	"Castaway"	4:36
6.	"Last Goodbye"	4:40
7.	"Virtual Supremacy"	4:02
8.	"Shadows' Prelude"	1:17
9.	"Symphony of Shadows"	6:53
Total length:		41:02

Japanese edition
No.	Title	Length
10.	"Artificial Night (Re-recording)"	7:23
11.	"Eye of the Storm (Single version)"	4:44
12.	"Eye of the Storm (Live)"	5:01
Total length:		58:10

== Personnel ==
- Lars Borup - Drums
- Gabriel Tuxen - Guitars, backing vocals
- Asger W. Nielsen - Keyboards, backing vocals
- Mads Mølbæk - Bass
- Björn Asking - Lead vocals

=== Guest musicians ===
- Alyzee - Female vocals on Beneath a Crescent Moon.
- Dr. P - Soprano vocals on Symphony of Shadows.

=== Production ===
- Tue Madsen - Mixing and mastering
