= X (Royal Hunt album) =

Studio album by Royal Hunt
- Released: 20 January 2010
- Studio: North Point Productions; Mediasound (New York City); Sun Studio (Memphis, Tennessee)
- Genre: Progressive metal
- Length: 49:35 (regular edition); 54:00 (bonus)
- Label: Scarlet Records (Europe), Avalon Marquee (Japan)
- Producer: André Andersen

Royal Hunt chronology
Collision Course... Paradox 2 (2008)	X (2010)	Show Me How to Live (2011)

X is the tenth studio album released by the band Royal Hunt on 20 January 2010, on Scarlet Records in Europe and on Marquee/Avalon Records in Japan.

== Track listing ==
All songs written by André Andersen.

1. "Episode X (Arrival)" - 1:59
2. "End of the Line" - 4:49
3. "King for a Day" - 4:49
4. "The Well" - 4:52
5. "Army of Slaves" - 6:00
6. "Shadowman" - 5:35
7. "Back to Square One" - 5:24
8. "Blood Red Stars" - 6:21
9. "The Last Leaf" - 4:25
10. "Falling Down" - 4:15
11. "Episode X (Departure)" - 1:06
12. "Sixth Sense" (European bonus track) - 4:25

== Personnel ==
=== Band members ===
- Mark Boals – vocals
- Marcus Jidell – guitar
- André Andersen – keyboards and guitar, producer
- Andreas Passmark – bass
- Allan Sørensen – drums

=== Additional musicians ===
- Kenny Lubcke, Maria McTurk, Henrik Brockmann, Michelle Raitzin, Gertrud Mogelgaard – backing vocals

== Production ==
- Recorded at North Point Productions, Media Sound and Sun Studios
- Michelle Raitzin's vocals recorded by Bill Malina at Sherman Oaks Studios, Los Angeles
- Mixed at Puk Studios by Lars Overgaard and André Andersen
- Mastered by Jan Eliasson at Audio Planet
- Cover, booklet & artwork design by Kai Brockschmidt
- Photography: Allen Ross Thomas
- Management: Michael Raitzin/Majestic Ent. Co LLC.

== Charts ==
Chart (2010)	Peak position
Japanese Albums (Oricon)	89
