= Chic McSherry =

Scottish musician, author and businessman

Chic McSherry OBE
- Born: Charles; 22 November 1958 (age 67); Lanark, Scotland
- Occupation: Chief Executive
- Website: Official website

Charles "Chic" McSherry OBE (born 22 November 1958) is a Scottish rock guitarist, songwriter, author and businessman. In his music career, he has written five studio albums with Doogie White and the band La Paz. In his business career, he is on the Board of Directors of six UK companies, one U.S. Company and one Mexican company. He has also written two crime fiction novels published by Wild Wolf Publishing He was awarded Officer Of The Order Of The British Empire (OBE) in the Queen's Birthday Honours List in 2018.

== Early life and music career ==
McSherry was born in Lanark, Scotland and lived most of his early life in Viewpark. He formed the rock band La Paz with vocalist Doogie White in 1984 and they developed a strong songwriting partnership. They played gigs around the UK for four years and released two albums on cassette before White left in 1988 to join melodic rock combo Midnight Blue and then went on to sing with Ritchie Blackmore's Rainbow, Yngwie Malmsteen, Tank, and Michael Schenker.

In January 2008, McSherry and Doogie White were invited to reform and play at Rock Radio's 1st Birthday Bash. They played a 5-number acoustic set to almost 1,000 people in The Garage, Glasgow along with other performers (GUN, SAHB, Thunder, Logan, and The Almighty). The show resulted in La Paz reforming as a full band and playing live again for the first time since 1988.

They played several shows in Scotland from 2008 through 2009 and in 2010 they secured a recording contract with Metal Mind Productions releasing their debut album Granite in February 2012. McSherry wrote most of the songs with White (with the exception of the ballad "Amy" - White/Mason) and also co-produced the album.

Following on from Granite, McSherry again collaborated with Doogie White to write 10 songs for a follow up album, The Dark And The Light, which was released by Metal Mind Productions in May 2013. McSherry wrote and arranged the music and also produced this album. The promotional single from the album, "Don't Drink With The Devil", was voted Number 1 Track Of The Week in the Classic Rock magazine readers' poll. The subsequent album review in the August 2013 edition of the magazine by Neil Jeffries singled out McSherry's part in the production of the work.

La Paz headlined the opening night at the 2014 Hard Rock Hell Festival on 20 March.

The last studio La Paz album, Shut Up And Rawk, written by McSherry and White and produced by McSherry was released by Metal Mind Productions in April 2016 and the band reformed to play at a pre-launch party at The Cathouse, Glasgow on 31 March 2016. The show was recorded and was released as a live album called "For One Nite Only" on 30 September 2022.

On 26 November 2023 McSherry joined former bandmates in La Paz onstage at Winterstorm.

McSherry produced the first album for singer/songwriter Mike Higgins (released in 2024).

== Other professional activities ==
After Doogie White left La Paz in 1988, McSherry concentrated on his business career and developed his software company, Prosys, into an international business. During that time the company targeted the US market and was known for its innovative training and staff development programmes. Prosys was the first IT company in the UK to be accredited an Investors In People. He served on the board of The Campaign For Learning alongside (former Sir) Fred Goodwin and became a regular spokesperson in various media outlets on the merits of developing people to improve business growth. Prosys were successfully re-accredited as Investors In People three times.

In 1997 he was asked to set up a subsidiary business for UK-based TIS Software Ltd in Melbourne, Australia and he was invited by Professor Richard Weaver at Glasgow Caledonian University to be a guest speaker on their MBA in Entrepreneurial Studies.

In 2003 he was involved in advising the Scottish Government on their broadband strategy and in 2004 he created a US company, iport software Inc, based in Houston, Texas, servicing the oil and gas sector. This move to open a permanent US office came about after a strategic review of the business options for Prosys post 9/11 and as a result he became part of the Global Scot Network.

He has been an Agency Contact for The Bank Of England's Regional Monetary Policy Committee since 2005 and provides market and economic information to the Bank Of England's Agency for Scotland which, in turn, feeds into the Bank's Inflation Policy Reports.

Due to the retirement of his business partner, McSherry sold the assets of Prosys to Trinity Computers in 2006 and concentrated on iport4business Limited, which became iPort Group International in 2010 after a 40% stake in the company was sold to the investment group, Coralinn.

A 2013 profile in The Herald, a Glasgow newspaper, stated that it was this that was a catalyst for his move into the Mexican marketplace. This resulted in the development and creation of iTravel-Cabo.com, an interactive tourist information website and bookings system.

In 2017 he created a new business - Big Red Digital Ltd by merging several of the existing iPort businesses together.

McSherry is a business mentor for Scottish Enterprise. and is involved in helping start-up and high-growth companies reach their full potential. He is also a Director of Lanarkshire Enterprise Services Limited, part of the Business Gateway network in Scotland. He holds a further Non-executive Director post with Second City Creative, an online digital training business, and is the Senior Partner in AchieveMore, a sales training and leadership development company."Goal setting techniques". www.achievemore.com. He also contributes to local children's charities in Cabo San Lucas, Mexico.

== Writing career ==
McSherry was a regular contributor to the business columns in both The Herald and The Scotsman newspapers during the 1990s. These occasional articles led to being offered a regular column called “Get a Grip” in the business magazine, UP!

He wrote a collection of essays on travel and fishing that was accepted for publishing by Jonathan Quiller of Swan Hill Press. The resultant book, Game Fishing Diaries, was published in the US in February 2004 by iUniverse.

He has also written two crime-fiction novels: Waging War To Shake The Cold and Lone Star, both published by Wild Wolf Publishing Limited.

In addition, he has self-published two eBooks: Game Fishing Diaries Volume II and All You Ever Wanted To Know About Starting A Business But Were Too Smart To Ask.

== Discography ==
La Paz

- Old Habits Die Hard (1985)
- The Amy Tapes (1988)
- Granite (2012)
- The Dark And The Light (2013)
- Shut Up And Rawk (2016)
- For One Night Only (2022)

As Producer

- Breaking Waves -Mike Higgins (2024)

== Bibliography ==
- Game Fishing Diaries (2004) ISBN 0595310125
- Game Fishing Diaries Volume II (2011) Amazon eBook
- All You Ever Wanted To Know About Starting A Business But Were Too Smart To Ask (2011) Amazon eBook
- Waging War To Shake The Cold (2011) ASIN: B007IHHULU
- Lone Star (2013) ASIN: B00CIXDGSA
