= Paradox (Royal Hunt album) =

1997 album

Studio album by Royal Hunt
- Released: 23 September 1997
- Recorded: Mirand Studios, Denmark
- Genre: Progressive metal
- Length: 54:56
- Label: Teichiku Records (Japan); Magna Carta Records (USA); Semaphore Records (Europe)
- Producer: André Andersen

Royal Hunt chronology
1996 (1996)	Paradox (1997)	Fear (1999)

Professional ratings
Review scores
Source	Rating
Allmusic	4.5/5 stars
Rock Hard	9/10 stars

Paradox is the fourth studio album released by the Danish progressive metal band Royal Hunt. This is a concept album, with lyrics inspired by religion and divinity. In 2025, it was ranked by Loudwire as the 11th best progressive metal album of the 1990s.

== Track listing ==
All songs written by André Andersen except where noted.

1. "The Awakening" – 1:39
2. "River of Pain" – 7:14
3. "Tearing Down the World" – 5:32
4. "Message to God" – 6:41
5. "Long Way Home" – 5:54
6. "Time Will Tell" – 9:31
7. "Silent Scream" – 6:13
8. "It's Over" – 6:20
9. "Martial Arts" (Instrumental)[Bonus Track] – 1:51
10. "The Final Lullaby" [Bonus Track] – 4:01 (Steen Mogensen)
11. "Restless" [Bonus Track] - 3:21

== Personnel ==
- D. C. Cooper – vocals
- André Andersen – keyboards and guitars
- Steen Mogensen – bass guitar
- Jacob Kjaer – guitar
- Allan Sørensen – drums

With

- Maria McTurk – backing vocals
- Lise Hansen – backing vocals
- Kenny Lubcke – backing vocals

== Production ==
- Mixing – Lars H. Nissen and Royal Hunt
