= Clown in the Mirror =

Studio album by Royal Hunt
- Released: 1994
- Genres: Progressive metal, hard rock
- Length: 52:45 (42:21)
- Labels: Teichiku Records (Japan); Rondel Records (USA)
- Producer: André Andersen

Royal Hunt chronology
Land of Broken Hearts (1992)	Clown in the Mirror (1994)	Moving Target (1995)

Professional ratings
Review scores
Source	Rating
Allmusic	4.5/5 stars

Clown in the Mirror is the second studio album released by Danish progressive metal band Royal Hunt. The album was re-released in 2020 on Vinyl featuring a separate lyrics sheet and a die cut album cover.

== Track listing ==
All songs written by André Andersen.

1. "Intro/Wasted Time" – 5:41
2. "Ten to Life" – 3:41
3. "On the Run" – 3:16
4. "Clown in the Mirror" – 4:37
5. "Third Stage" (Instrumental) – 1:42
6. "Bodyguard" – 4:13
7. "Legion of the Damned" – 5:00
8. "Here Today, Gone Tomorrow" – 4:12
9. "Bad Blood" – 3:58
10. "Epilogue" – 6:01
11. "Age Gone Wild" (Acoustic version) – 4:03
12. "Kingdom Dark" (Acoustic version) – 3:05
13. "Bad Luck" – 3:16
- Tracks 11–13 omitted on the European release (Rondel Records RRCD 9009)
- Tracks 11–13 originally on The Maxi EP
- Rondel Records version, "Intro" and "Wasted Time" are 2 split tracks

== Personnel ==
- André Andersen – keyboards and rhythm guitar
- Henrik Brockmann – lead and backing vocals
- Steen Mogensen – bass guitar
- Jacob Kjaer – lead guitar
- Kenneth Olsen – drums

with

- Maria McTurk – backing vocals
- Lise Hansen – backing vocals

== Production ==
- Recorded at Mirand Studio, Media Sound Productions, Copenhagen and House Of Music, New Jersey, USA
- Mixed at House Of Music, New Jersey, USA by Royal Hunt and Nelson Ayers
- Mastered at Sterling Sound, NY by George Marino
- Art direction and Illustration by Martin Burridge
