= Paper Blood =

Studio album by Royal Hunt
- Released: 6 June 2005
- Recorded: Northpoint Productions, Denmark
- Genre: Progressive metal
- Length: 56:26
- Label: Frontiers
- Producer: André Andersen

Royal Hunt chronology
Eyewitness (2003)	Paper Blood (2005)	2006 Live (2006)

Professional ratings
Review scores
Source	Rating
Allmusic	3.5/5 stars

Paper Blood is the eighth studio album released by the band Royal Hunt. It is the first album without longtime members Jacob Kjaer and Steen Mogensen who both left the band in December 2003. It is also the last studio album to feature John West on vocals.

== Track listing ==
All songs written by André Andersen.

1. "Break Your Chains" – 5:33
2. "Not My Kind" – 6:21
3. "Memory Lane" (Instrumental) – 5:20
4. "Never Give Up" – 5:32
5. "Seven Days" – 6:22
6. "SK 983" (Instrumental) – 4:41
7. "Kiss of Faith" – 5:19
8. "Paper Blood" – 5:08
9. "Season's Change" – 4:55
10. "Twice Around the World" (Instrumental) – 7:15

== Personnel ==
- André Andersen – keyboards and bass guitar
- John West – vocals
- Marcus Jidell – guitars
- Allan Sørensen – drums

with

- Kenneth Olsen – percussion
- Kenny Lubcke – backing vocals
- Maria McTurk – backing vocals
- Soma Allpas – cello
- Peter Brander – dobro

== Additional Info ==
- Mixed by Lars Overgaard at EMI/Medley Studio
- Mastered by Jan Eliasson at Tocano Mastering
- Illustration by Carlos Del Olmo Hlmberg
- Layout by Christina Laugesen
