= Eyewitness (Royal Hunt album) =

Studio album by Royal Hunt
- Released: 23 June 2003
- Genre: Progressive metal
- Length: 50:28 (59:00)
- Label: Frontiers; FR CD 147
- Producer: André Andersen

Royal Hunt chronology
The Watchers (2001)	Eyewitness (2003)	Paper Blood (2005)

Eyewitness is the seventh studio album released by the band Royal Hunt.

== Track listing ==
All songs written by André Andersen.

1. "Hunted" – 5:06
2. "Can't Let Go" – 5:02
3. "The Prayer" – 3:29
4. "Edge of the World" – 6:14
5. "Burning the Sun" – 6:10
6. "Wicked Lounge" – 3:49
7. "5th Element" (Instrumental) – 4:10
8. "Help Us God" – 6:47
9. "Game of Fear" – 4:33
10. "Eyewitness" – 5:08

Japan edition adds the following

11. "Day Is Dawning" (Andersen/West) - 3:46

Special digipack edition (FR CD 147D) adds the following

11. "Martial Arts" (Instrumental) – 2:59
12. "Follow Me" (Live version recorded on Japanese tour 2002) – 5:33

== Personnel ==
- André Andersen – keyboards and rhythm guitar
- John West – vocals
- Steen Mogensen – bass guitar
- Jacob Kjaer – lead guitar
- Allan Tschicaja – drums
- Steve Daniels – saxophone
- Maria McTurk – backing vocals
- Kenny Lubcke – backing vocals
- Laura Faurschou – backing vocals
- Soma Allpas – cello
