= The Mission (Royal Hunt album) =

Studio album by Royal Hunt
- Released: 21 August 2001
- Genre: Progressive metal
- Length: 51:46
- Label: Century Media; 8073
- Producer: André Andersen

Royal Hunt chronology
Fear (1999)	The Mission (2001)	The Watchers (2001)

Professional ratings
Review scores
Source	Rating
Allmusic	link

The Mission is the sixth studio album released by Royal Hunt. It is a concept album based on Ray Bradbury's sci-fi classic 'The Martian Chronicles'. Each track from this album is dedicated to the defined chapter of the book.

== Track listing ==
All songs written by André Andersen except where noted.

1. "Take Off" (Instrumental) – 1:04
2. "The Mission" – 5:50
3. "Exit Gravity" (Instrumental) – 1:05
4. "Surrender" – 5:30 (Andersen/West)
5. "Clean Sweep" – 1:57
6. "Judgement Day" – 6:28
7. "Metamorphosis" (Instrumental) – 1:25
8. "World Wide War" – 6:26 (Andersen/West)
9. "Dreamline" (Instrumental) – 2:07 (Andersen/Kjaer)
10. "Out of Reach" – 5:26
11. "Fourth Dimension" (Instrumental) – 2:34
12. "Days of No Trust" – 4:55
13. "Total Recall" – 6:59

== The Mission and 'The Martian Chronicles' ==
1. "Take Off" - "August 2001 - The Settlers"
2. "The Mission" – "January 1999 - Rocket Summer"
3. "Exit Gravity" - "October 2002 - The Shore"
4. "Surrender" – "April 2000 - The Third Expedition"
5. "Clean Sweep" – "April 2005 - Usher II"
6. "Judgement Day" – "June 2001 - And The Moon Be Still As Bright"
7. "Metamorphosis" - "February 2002 - The Locusts"
8. "World Wide War" – "August 2026 - There Will Come Soft Rain"
9. "Dreamline" (Instrumental) – "February 2003 - Interim"
10. "Out of Reach" – "August 2002 - Night Meeting"
11. "Fourth Dimension" - "November 2005 - The Watchers"
12. "Days of No Trust" – "April 2026 - The Long Years"
13. "Total Recall" – "November 2005 - The Off Season"

== Personnel ==
- André Andersen – Keyboards and rhythm guitar
- John West – Vocals
- Steen Mogensen – Bass guitar
- Jacob Kjaer – Lead guitar

With

- Kenneth Olsen – Drums
- Kim Johanneson – Drums
- Maria McTurk – Backing vocals
- Kenny Lubcke – Backing vocals

== Production ==
- Mixing – Lars Overgaard
