= Cornerstone (Danish band) =

Danish hard rock band

Cornerstone is a Danish hard rock band. They released four albums and one live album, all on Massacre Records.

The band featured Doogie White on vocals and Steen Mogensen of Royal Hunt on the bass.

== Discography ==
- Arrival (2000)
- Human Stain (2002)
- Once upon Our Yesterdays (2003)
- In Concert (live album, 2005)
- Two Tales of One Tomorrow (2007)

== External link ==
- Discogs

=== Further reading ===
- Review of Arrival by Metal Temple
- Review of Human Stain by Metal Temple
- Review of Human Stain by Disagreement
- Review of Human Stain by Metal Bite
- Review of Human Stain by Darkscene.at (in German)
- Review of Once Upon Our Yesterdays by Disagreement
- Review of Once Upon Our Yesterdays by Darkscene.at (in German)
- Review of Once Upon Our Yesterdays by PowerofMetal.dk
- Review of Once Upon Our Yesterdays by Get Ready to Rock!

- Review of Two Tales of One Tomorrow by Lollipop Magazine
- Review of Two Tales of One Tomorrow by Metal 1 (in German)
- Review of Two Tales of One Tomorrow by Metal Fan (in Dutch)
- Review of Two Tales of One Tomorrow by Metal Rage
- Review of Two Tales of One Tomorrow by Disagreement
- Review of Two Tales of One Tomorrow by PowerofMetal.dk
- Review of Two Tales of One Tomorrow by Twilight-Magazin (in German)
- Review of Two Tales of One Tomorrow by FFM-Rock (in German)
