= Doogie White =

Scottish singer (born 1960)

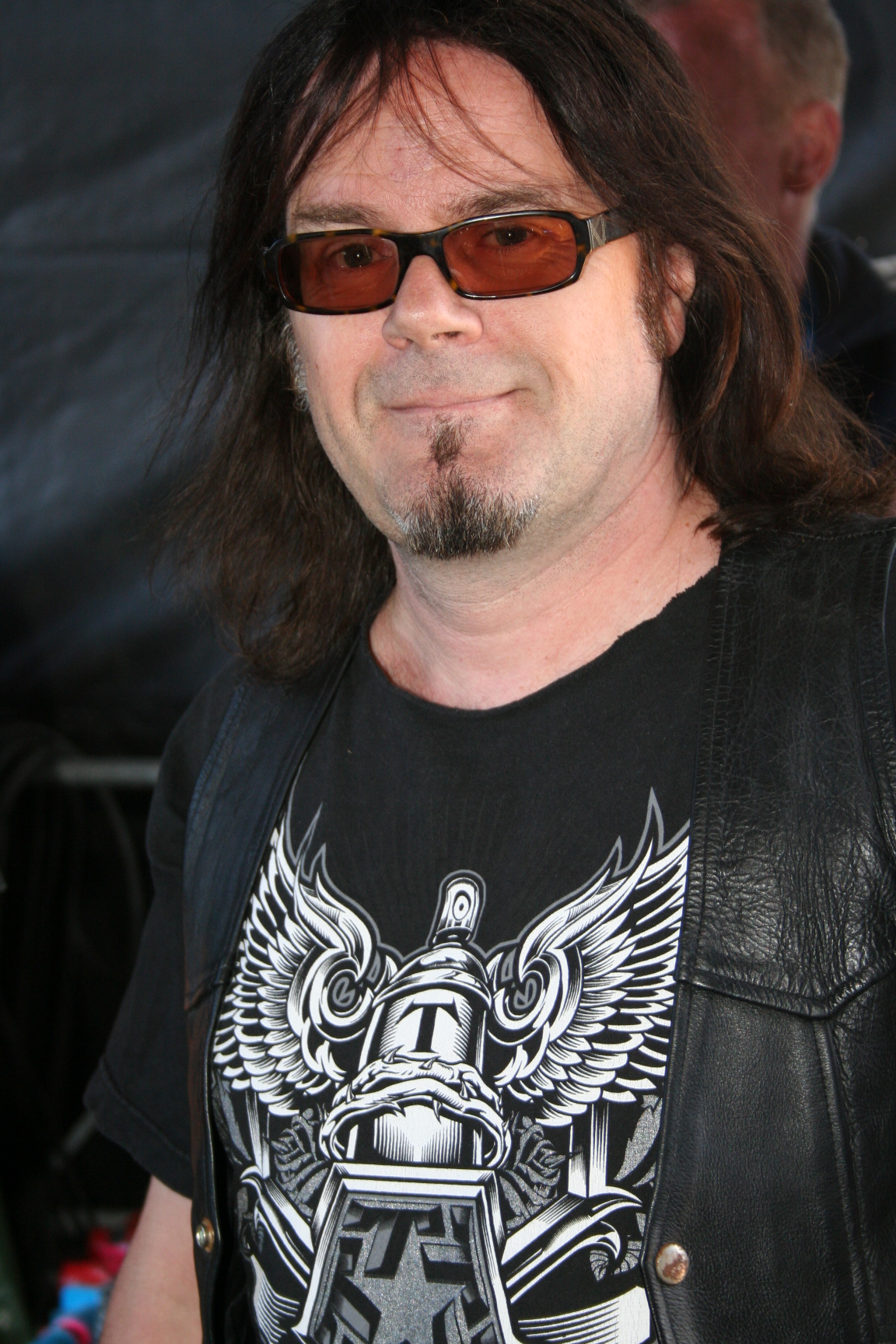
- White with Tank in 2009

Background information
- Born: 7 March 1960 (age 66); Motherwell, Lanarkshire, Scotland
- Genres: Hard rock, heavy metal, power metal, neoclassical metal
- Occupation: Singer
- Years active: 1984–present
- Member of: La Paz
- Formerly of: Praying Mantis; Midnight Blue; Rainbow; Chain; Cornerstone; Liesegang; Rising Force; M3; Empire; Rata Blanca; Tank; Demon's Eye Temple of Rock; WAMI; Alcatrazz
- Website: doogiewhite.com

Douglas Thomson "Doogie" White (born 7 March 1960) is a Scottish rock vocalist who is the lead singer of La Paz. In addition to La Paz, White has sung for numerous bands, most notably Rainbow from 1993 to 1997.

== Early life ==
White was born in the Dalziel parish of Motherwell on 7 March 1960.

He formed La Paz with guitarist Chic McSherry in 1984, playing around Scotland for four years and releasing two albums on cassette, before in 1988 joining melodic rock combo Midnight Blue. A trip to Japan in 1991 singing with Praying Mantis in a NWOBHM revival tour followed.

== Career ==
=== Rainbow ===
After a demo tape forwarded to Ritchie Blackmore's management sat in a box for a few years, Candice Night discovered it and presented it to Blackmore when he was looking for singers to audition for a solo project that would later be called Rainbow. Consequently, White was asked to audition, subsequently joining the band in 1994. He had also auditioned for metal bands Pink Cream 69 and Iron Maiden, losing out to Wolfsbane's Blaze Bayley.

To indicate how quickly his fortunes had changed in the year since meeting Blackmore, when Rainbow played the Labbatt's Apollo in Hammersmith, London in November 1995, he joked with the audience that the last time he was at the venue only a few years before, he was selling hotdogs in the lobby.

Just before the Rainbow job, White had been busy laying down tracks with Cozy Powell and Neil Murray for a solo Powell project.

=== Other professional activities ===
After the end of Rainbow in 1997, White then worked with former Midnight Blue guitarist Alex Dickson with the intention of securing a solo deal. Sessions on several tribute releases were next, the Whitesnake tribute Snakebites (2000), and several tracks included on 666 Number of the Beast (2004) a two-volume tribute to Iron Maiden out on Deadline. White also guested on Nikolo Kotzev's conceptual Nostradamus 2001 release.

A contribution to Royal Hunt bassist Steen Morgensen's solo project Arrival (under the moniker Cornerstone) was released in late 2000. A further series of albums were produced this time with White's creative input. White also joined Yngwie Malmsteen's Rising Force, touring through South America in late 2001, while Attack (2002) was White's first studio effort with the Swede.

Once Upon Our Yesterdays (2003) was the next Cornerstone album, and a set of dates for the band across Europe marked their live debut. In 2003, White was once again hired by Praying Mantis to provide vocals for half of the songs of their album The Journey Goes On.

In 2005, White fronted another Malmsteen opus, titled Unleash the Fury. In this year, he also recorded an album with guitarist Bill Liesegang under the Liesegang/White moniker. He also put together a part-time band with Mostly Autumn personnel monikered White Noise. A DVD from their support stint in the UK with Uriah Heep featured a live airing of "Tarot Woman" as well as other Rainbow tracks.

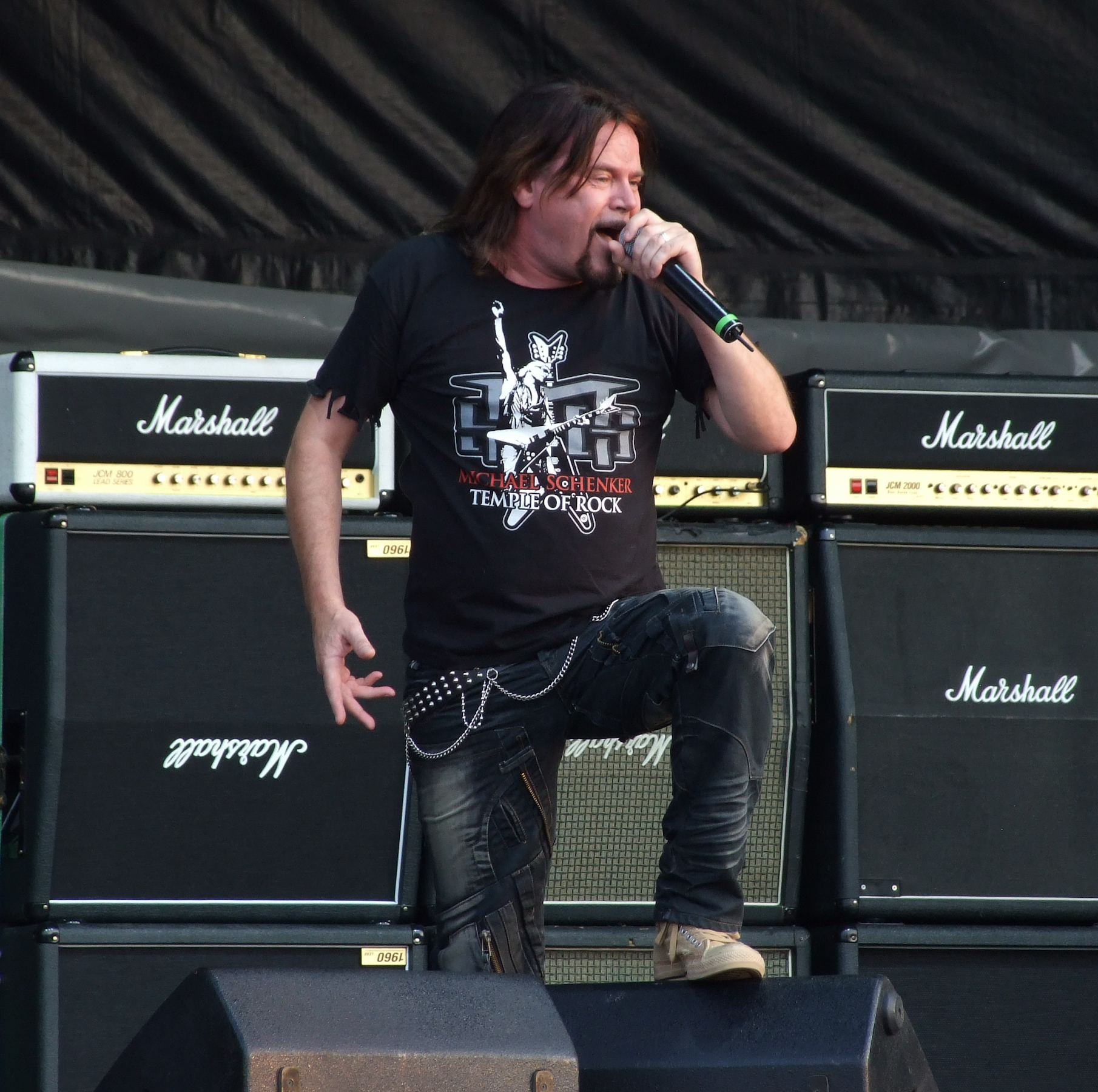
White performing with Michael Schenker Group (MSG) at Kavarna Rock Fest 2012

in July 2007 he auditioned to lead sing for the israeli project Amaseffer but lost the part to Mats Levén

In 2007, the fourth Cornerstone album, Two Tales of One Tomorrow was released. Later the same year, White replaced Tony Martin as the frontman of the German band Empire. Empire released their fourth album Chasing Shadows in November, with White handling all vocal duties. On 26 February 2008, White announced on his website that he would no longer be a member of Yngwie Malmsteen's Rising Force.

On 20 December 2008, White was announced to be the new singer for NWOBHM band Tank. Tank's first album with White as lead singer is titled War Machine and was released in October 2010. In 2009, White was performing with La Paz again, as well as Tank. He has also recorded the vocals for an English version of the latest album by Argentinian rockers Rata Blanca.

He performed with Jon Lord twice, stepping in for Lord's regular singer Steve Balsamo. On 1 September 2009, White sang vocal parts in Lord's Concerto for Group and Orchestra at the opening night of the Fall Arts Fest in Plovdiv, Bulgaria. On 23 June 2010 he performed with Lord again, this time in Luxembourg during the Classic Rock Night with Big Band Opus 78.

In 2010, White participated in a tribute album titled Mister Bolin's Late Night Revival, a compilation of 17 previously unreleased tracks written by Tommy Bolin prior to his death in 1976. The CD included other artists such as HiFi Superstar, Eric Martin, Troy Luccketta, Jeff Pilson, Randy Jackson, Rachel Barton, Rex Carroll, Derek St. Holmes, Kimberley Dahme, and The 77s. A percentage of the proceeds from this project will benefit the Jackson Recovery Centers.

In 2011, White released an album with original material with German band Demon's Eye, titled The Stranger Within. White released his first solo album, titled As Yet Untitled in October 2011. He also completed an album of new material and reworked old songs with his first band La Paz. This album was called Granite and was released in February 2012. Tank released a second album with White on vocals, War Nation, in 2012.

A La Paz album with all new songs titled The Dark and the Light was released in May 2013. White has recently recorded an album with Michael Schenker titled Bridge the Gap, to be released in November 2013. He recorded an album with Vinny Appice, Marco Mendoza and Iggy Gwadera in 2014. In 2015, White released another album with Demon's Eye, titled Under The Neon and collaborated in the second Stardust Reverie Project album titled Proclamation of Shadows singing the tunes "410 Chelsea Street" and "Bring me the Hat of the Wizard from the West" (White appears in the video made for this song).

White recorded two albums with Michael Schenker under the Temple of Rock moniker. Schenker reinvented his band as Michael Schenker Fest in 2017, which included various vocalists who had previously sung for it, including White. In 2020, White joined Alcatrazz, replacing original vocalist Graham Bonnet, with whom he had been part of Michael Schenker Fest. His most recent project is an album with Persuader guitarist Emil Norberg under the name Long Shadows Dawn.

== Band timeline ==
- La Paz (1984–1988, 2009–present)
- Midnight Blue (1994)
- Ritchie Blackmore's Rainbow (1994–1997)
- Chain (1997)
- Sack Trick (1997-2000)
- Cornerstone (2000–2007)
- Yngwie Malmsteen's Rising Force (2002–2007)
- Liesegang / White (2005)
- The Company of Snakes (2005)
- Empire (2007)
- Solo (2008–present)
- Tank (2008–2014)
- Rata Blanca (2009–2010)
- Demon's Eye (2011–2015)
- Michael Schenker's Temple of Rock (2011–2016)
- WAMI (2014)
- Michael Schenker Fest (2018–2020)
- Alcatrazz (2020–2024)

== Discography ==
Date	Artist	Album title	Notes
1985	La Paz	Old Habits Die Hard	Studio, Cassette only
1988	La Paz	The Amy Tapes	Studio, Cassette only
1994	Midnight Blue	Take the Money and Run	Studio
1995	Ritchie Blackmore's Rainbow	Stranger in Us All	Studio
1995	Ritchie Blackmore's Rainbow	Black Masquerade – Rockpalast '95	Live, DVD&CD, Recorded 1995
1997	Chain	Eros of Love and Destruction	Studio
1999	Sack Trick	Music From The Mystery Rabbits	Studio
2000	Sack Trick	Penguins On The Moon	Studio
2000	Cornerstone	Arrival	Studio
2002	Cornerstone	Human Stain	Studio
2003	Cornerstone	Once upon Our Yesterdays	Studio
2005	Cornerstone	In Concert	Live
2007	Cornerstone	Two Tales of One Tomorrow	Studio
2002	Yngwie Malmsteen's Rising Force	Attack!!	Studio
2005	Yngwie Malmsteen's Rising Force	Unleash the Fury	Studio
2003	Praying Mantis	The Journey Goes On	Studio, tracks: 2 to 4, 6 to 8, 10
2005	Liesegang / White	Visual Surveillance of Extreme	Studio
2005	M3	Rough an' Ready	Live, DVD＆CD
2007	Empire	Chasing Shadows	Studio
2009	Rata Blanca	The Forgotten Kingdom	Studio, English version
2010	Tank (Tucker/Evans)	War Machine	Studio
2012	Tank (Tucker/Evans)	War Nation	Studio
2011	Demon's Eye	The Stranger Within	Studio
2015	Demon's Eye	Under the Neon	Studio
2011	Doogie White	As Yet Untitled	Studio, Solo album
2012	Doogie White & La Paz	Granite	Studio
2013	Doogie White & La Paz	The Dark and the Light	Studio
2016	Doogie White & La Paz	Shut Up and Rawk!	Studio
2011	Michael Schenker's Temple of Rock	Temple of Rock	Studio, only one track (Before the Devil knows you´re dead)
2012	Michael Schenker's Temple of Rock	Temple of Rock: Live in Europe	Live
2013	Michael Schenker's Temple of Rock	Bridge the Gap	Studio
2015	Michael Schenker's Temple of Rock	Spirit On A Mission	Studio
2016	Michael Schenker's Temple of Rock	On a Mission: Live in Madrid	Live
2014	WAMI (White/Appice/Mendoza/Iggy)	Kill The King	Studio
2015	Stardust Reverie Project	Proclamation of Shadows	Studio, track 5, 7
2017	John Steel & Doogie White	Everything or Nothing	Studio
2018	Come Taste The Band	Reignition	Studio, All tracks except 5 & 6
2018	Michael Schenker Fest	Resurrection	Studio, track 2, 3, 5, 9, 12
2019	Michael Schenker Fest	Revelation	Studio, track 1, 2, 4, 6, 11
2021	Michael Schenker Group	Immortal	Studio, only one track (In search of the peace of mind)
2021	Long Shadows Dawn	Isle of Wrath	Studio
2021	Alcatrazz	V	Studio
2023	Alcatrazz	Take No Prisoners	Studio

=== Guest sessions ===
- Gary Hughes: Once and Future King Part II (2003)
- Takayoshi Ohmura: Nowhere to Go (2004)
- Takayoshi Ohmura: Emotions in Motion (2007)
- Anphoria's Empire: Single "Believe in the Mothercorn" (2009) (Story about this song)
- Sebastien: Tears of White Roses (2010)
- Roadway: ROADWAY (2011)

== Videography ==
- White Noise: In the Hall of the Mountain King (2004)
- Deep Purple Rock Review 1969–1972 (2004)
- Inside Black Sabbath (2004)
- Inside Rainbow (2004)
- M 3: Rough an' Ready (2006)
- Guitar Gods – Ritchie Blackmore (2007)
- Rainbow: Black Masquerade – Rockpalast '95 (2013)
