= Crown of Autumn =

Italian metal band

Crown of Autumn is an Italian dark/melodic death metal band. They have released three albums.

The band hails from Milan. In the 2010s they released albums through My Kingdom Music, who also re-released 1997's The Treasures Arcane with the subtitle Transfigurated Edition.

Emanuele Rastelli and Mattia Stancioiu of Crown of Autumn also released an album under the band name Magnifiqat; Il più antico dei giorni (2004). Mattia Stancioiu also played in other bands, most notably Labÿrinth.

== Discography ==
- The Treasures Arcane (1997)
- Splendours from the Dark (2011)
- Byzantine Horizons (2019)
