= Seven Gates =

Italian metal band

Seven Gates was an Italian power metal band. They released two albums.

The band was founded in 1999 in Florence. 2008's The Good and the Evil saw a release the following year by IceWarrior Records and Rock It Up Records. There were also talks about a re-release of their debut album Unreality by the same labels in 2010, as well as the making of a third album.

== Discography ==
- Unreality (2002)
- The Good and the Evil (2008)

The band should not be confused with The Seven Gates, a French metal band who released Angel of Suffering in 2009.
