= The Watchers (album) =

Studio album by Royal Hunt
- Released: 15 December 2001
- Recorded: May-August 2000
- Genre: Progressive metal
- Length: 69:06
- Label: Century Media
- Producer: André Andersen

Royal Hunt chronology
The Mission (2001)	The Watchers (2001)	Eyewitness (2003)

Professional ratings
Review scores
Source	Rating
Allmusic	2/5 stars

The Watchers is an album released by Danish progressive metal band Royal Hunt, comprising a new long suite, already published in Japan in the EP titled Intervention - Part 1, re-recorded versions of old songs and some live tracks. The live tracks were recorded from May to August 2000.

== Track listing ==
All songs written by André Andersen.

1. "Intervention" – 14:02
2. "Lies" (live) – 9:42
3. "Flight" (live) – 4:32
4. "Message to God" (live) – 6:10
5. "Epilogue" (live) – 8:04
6. "One by One" (re-recorded Version) – 5:33
7. "Clown in the Mirror" (re-recorded Version) – 5:36
8. "Day In Day Out" (re-recorded Version) – 3:59
9. "Legion of the Damned" (re-recorded Version) – 5:17
10. "Intervention" (Radio Edit) – 5:56

== Personnel ==
- André Andersen – keyboards and guitars
- John West – lead and backing vocals
- Jacob Kjaer – guitars
- Steen Mogensen – bass guitar
- Allan Sorensen – drums
- Maria McTurk backing vocals
- Kenny Lubcke backing vocals
