= Shining Fury =

Italian metal band

Shining Fury is an Italian power metal band. They have released two albums, both on Metal Blade Records.

Signed to Metal Blade for their debut album, an early lineup was Francesco Neretti on vocals, Toniello and Tommy Pellegrini on the guitars, Alessandro Cola on the bass and Ross Lukather (of Death SS) on the drums. Oleg Smirnoff (Eldritch) also contributed as a keyboardist.

In 2019 there were reports about the band reforming around Lukather to make a third album after Another Life.

== Discography ==
- Last Sunrise (2004)
- Another Life (2006)
