= Moving Target (Royal Hunt album) =

Studio album by Royal Hunt
- Released: 1996
- Recorded: 1995
- Genre: Progressive metal
- Length: 46:43
- Labels: Teichiku Records (Japan); Rondel Records (USA)
- Producer: André Andersen

Royal Hunt chronology
Clown in the Mirror (1994)	Moving Target (1996)	1996 (1996)

Professional ratings
Review scores
Source	Rating
Allmusic	4/5 stars

Moving Target is the third studio album released by the Danish progressive metal band Royal Hunt.

== Track listing ==
All songs written by André Andersen.

1. "Last Goodbye" – 6:33
2. "1348" – 4:32
3. "Makin' a Mess" – 4:00
4. "Far Away" – 4:58
5. "Step by Step" – 5:11
6. "Autograph" (Instrumental) – 3:36
7. "Stay Down" – 4:21
8. "Give It Up" – 4:01
9. "Time" – 4:53
10. "Far Away (acoustic) - 4:38 (bonus track for Japan)

== Personnel ==
- D. C. Cooper – lead and backing vocals
- André Andersen – keyboards and guitars
- Steen Mogensen – bass guitar
- Jacob Kjaer – guitar
- Kenneth Olsen – drums

with

- Maria McTurk – backing vocals
- Lise Hansen – backing vocals
