= Seven Thorns =

Danish power metal band

- 2015 line-up. From L to R: Mads, Asger, Björn, Lars, Gabriel.

Background information
- Origin: Copenhagen, Denmark
- Genres: Power metal
- Years active: 1998-present
- Label: Sonic Revolution
- Members: Lars Borup; Mads Mølbæk
- Website: www.SevenThorns.com

Seven Thorns is a Danish power metal band formed in 1998. The group have undergone multiple changes in line-up leading up to the release of their debut album, Return to the Past in 2010. Despite being somewhat latecomers to the power metal scene, the first 2 albums has clear inspiration from the "old school of power metal" citing influences by bands such as Gamma Ray, Helloween and Stratovarius. The later albums shows a more dark approach than the majority of power metal bands.

== History ==
Seven Thorns was founded in 1998 by drummer Lars Borup. However, the search for other permanent band members was unsuccessful, so Seven Thorns was put on hold in 2000. In 2004 Mik Holm joined Lars as songwriter and lead singer which led to the first complete line-up later that same year. The band's first single Artificial Night was recorded and released in the beginning of 2005 and was nominated for a Danish Metal Award.

From 2005 to 2007 Seven Thorns was on hiatus with the exit of Mik and the addition of a new lead singer. The band name was changed to 7thorns, which, despite the name similarity, was only meant as a side project. 7thorns wrote and recorded one album entitled Glow of Dawn but this was never released officially. The "original" Seven Thorns was revived again in 2007 by Mik and Lars after the 7thorns project had been terminated. Although Mik does not function as an active member as such, he contributes to the songwriting for Seven Thorns.

Seven Thorns was ready with new line-up in late 2008 and a single entitled Forest Majesty was recorded over New Year of 2008-09 and released in March 2009 by Airbourne Records, a small Danish label.

After the release of the debut album Return to the Past in 2010 through Nightmare Records Seven Thorns signed a promotion contract with the German agency Rock N Growl. The promotion deal resulted in numerous top class reviews by magazines and e-zines from all over the world as well as radio airplay in both Europe, The United States and Japan.

In the summer of 2011 Seven Thorns embarked on their first European tour along with Circle II Circle playing multiple shows and festivals. They have since toured with American glam metal act Lillian Axe, also promoting the arrival of their new lead singer, Gustav Blide.

The band's follow-up album, entitled II was released in February 2014 which garnered equal amounts of positive reviews and radio airplay. As the recording of II was still ongoing when Blide joined the line-up the lead vocals were performed by Erik Blomkvist. However, Blide provided the majority of backing vocals for the album.

Between mid-2014 and mid-2015 Gustav Blide, Christian Strøjer and Nicolaj Marker left the band to attend to other obligations. Björn Asking and Mads Mølbæk joined the ranks of Seven Thorns, covering the duties of lead singer and bassist respectively.

Seven Thorns have toured with and supported Anvil, Jørn Lande, Raven, Freedom Call, Blitzkrieg, Serious Black, Visions of Atlantis, Primal Fear and many many more.

== Members ==
=== Current ===
- Marco Biagioli - vocals
- Alicke Kostopoulou - vocals
- Lars Borup - drums (ex-Illnath)
- Mads Mølbæk - bass
- Magnus Koudahl - guitar

=== Former ===
- Asger Waagner Nielsen - keyboards 2009-2022
- Gabriel Tuxen - guitar 2008-2022
- Björn Asking - vocals 2015-2023
- Gustav Blide - vocals 2012-2014
- Christian Strøjer - guitar 2008-2014
- Dr. No - guitar 1998-2000
- Daniel Stilling - guitar 1999
- Peter Falk - guitar 2004-2006
- Jesper Munk - guitar 2003-2006
- Pil - keyboards 2003-2004
- Nicolaj Marker - bass 2008-2015
- Tommy Strauss - bass 2003-2004
- Artur Meinhild - keyboards (Illnath, Evil Masquerade) 2004-2006

== Discography ==
=== Studio albums ===
- Return to the Past (2010)
- II (2013)
- Symphony of Shadows (2018)

=== EPs ===
- "Artificial Night" (released under the name 7thorns) (2005)
