= Drakkar (Italian band) =

Italian metal band

Drakkar is an Italian power metal band. They have released seven albums, through labels such as Dragonheart Records, My Kingdom Music and Punishment 18 Records.

== Discography ==
- Quest for Glory (1998)
- Gemini (2000)
- Razorblade God (2002)
- When Lightning Strikes (2012)
- Run with the Wolf (2015)
- Cold Winter's Night (EP, 2018)
- Chaos Lord (2021)
- Spread Your Wings (2024)
