= Land of Broken Hearts =

Studio album by Royal Hunt
- Released: 1992
- Genres: Progressive metal, hard rock
- Length: 47:32
- Labels: Teichiku Records (Japan); Rondel Records (USA)
- Producer: André Andersen

Royal Hunt chronology
Land of Broken Hearts (1992)	Clown in the Mirror (1994)

Professional ratings
Review scores
Source	Rating
Allmusic	4/5 stars
BW&BK	8/10 stars
MetalCrypt	(3.25/5)

Land of Broken Hearts is the debut studio album released by the Danish progressive metal band Royal Hunt. The album was remastered and re-released in October of 2021, with the inclusion of five bonus tracks.

== Track listing ==
All songs written by André Andersen.

1. "Running Wild" – 5:08
2. "Easy Rider" – 4:59
3. "Flight" – 4:00
4. "Age Gone Wild" – 4:32
5. "Martial Arts" (Instrumental) – 1:52
6. "One by One" – 4:34
7. "Heart of the City" – 3:43
8. "Land of Broken Hearts" – 4:41
9. "Freeway Jam" (Instrumental) – 1:32
10. "Kingdom Dark" – 4:28
11. "Stranded" – 4:41 (Bonus Track for Japan)
12. "Day In Day Out" – 3:22 (Bonus Track for Japan)

== Personnel ==
- André Andersen – keyboards and guitars
- Henrik Brockmann – lead and backing vocals
- Steen Mogensen – bass guitar
- Kenneth Olsen – drums
- Henrik Johannessen – all guitars on "Day In Day Out"
- Jacob Kjaer – guitars on "Freeway Jam", "Day In Day Out(Video)", "Stranded", "Age Gone Wild"
- Mac Guanaa – guitar solos
- Maria McTurk – backing vocals
- Maria Nørfelt – backing vocals
- Carsten Olsen – backing vocals

== Production ==
- Mixing – Peter Brander and Royal Hunt at Media Sound Productions
- Recorded at Mirand Studio, Copenhagen. "Stranded" and "Day In And Day Out" recorded at Sterling Sound, New York.
- Mastered at Sweet Silence Studios
- Logo and direction by Martin Burridge
