= La Paz (band) =

Scottish rock band

- Origin: Scotland
- Genres: Hard rock, heavy metal
- Years active: 1984–1988; 2009–present
- Labels: Metal Mind
- Members: Doogie White; Chic McSherry; Alex Carmichael; Andy Mason; Paul McManus

La Paz is a Scottish rock band that was originally formed in 1984 by Doogie White, Chic McSherry and Alex Carmichael. The group toured around in Scotland in the early 80s and released two albums. The band broke up in 1988 when Doogie White quit the band to join Midnight Blue and later Ritchie Blackmore's Rainbow.

La Paz played live regularly, sometimes playing over a hundred gigs in a year throughout Scotland. They also played the Marquee Club in London as well as some festivals. They were featured regularly in the rock magazine Kerrang! (Derek Oliver becoming a fan of the band) and attracted interest from a number of UK and US record companies, finally agreeing terms with one of them for a three-album deal. However, the deal fell through at the very last minute and Doogie White moved to London to pursue his career alone.

The band was reunited again in 2009 and released three new albums: Granite in 2012;The Dark and the Light 2013; and Shut Up And Rawk 2016 all on the Polish record label, Metal Mind Productions.

2014 marked the 30th anniversary of the band and to celebrate they headlined the opening night of the Hard Rock Hell AOR Festival in Wales.

== Members ==
- Doogie White (Vocals, 1984–1988, 2009–present)
- Chic McSherry (Guitars, 1984–1988, 2009–present)
- Alex Carmichael (Bass, 1984–1988, 2009–present)
- Andy Mason (Keyboards, 1984–1988, 2009–present)
- Paul McManus (Drums, 1984–1988, 2009–present)

== Discography ==
- Old Habits Die Hard (1985) (Cassette only)
- The Amy Tapes (1988) (Cassette only)
- Granite (2012)
- The Dark and the Light (2013)
- Shut Up And Rawk (2016)
- For One Night Only (2022)
