= Emir Hot =

Musical artist from Bosnia and Herzegovina (born 1978)

- Born: February 23, 1978 (age 48); Tuzla, Bosnia and Herzegovina
- Genres: classical; traditional; popular
- Instrument: guitar

Emir Hot (February 23, 1978), guitarist from Tuzla, Bosnia and Herzegovina, who currently lives in Dubrovnik, Croatia. He achieved major success in London, UK.

== Biography ==
Born in Tuzla in 1978. He gathered musical knowledge from his native Tuzla through Boston and the Berklee College of Music.

In his hometown, he played with the Neon Knights. In the late 90s, he was a member of the new city hard rock/heavy metal band Southern Storm, formed in December 1998. Without much media support, word spread throughout Bosnia and Herzegovina that "some team from Tuzla" was playing a great gig. They played at the first Heineken Music Fest in Zenica in 2001, won, and released the album "1999" as part of the festival production. Hot decided to try something new and left the band.

He won the Guitar Hero UK competition in London in 2005. He graduated in modern music from the Guitar Institute at Thames Valley University in London. In the summer of 2015, he temporarily joined the band Brkovi, whose guitarist Prasac broke his finger. With him in the lineup, they recorded the album Torzo by Dado Topić. After the return of the original member, Brkovi continued to play with the old lineup.

In his career, he has participated in over 300 projects related to various musical styles (rock, traditional music, folk, pop, blues, film music and theatre music). He has also participated in session projects as a guitarist, composer and arranger. Participant in numerous music workshops and humanitarian projects. He has released seven albums. His solo album is Sevdah Metal, published by the parent company Lion Music from Finland in 2008. He founded the educational guitar web portal live4guitar.com. Collaborator of many recognized international and domestic musical artists. He was a guest guitarist on albums by artists from Bosnia and Herzegovina and neighboring countries (Crvena Jabuka, Giuliano, Brkovi, Dean Clea, Mostar Sevdah Reunion). He did several songs and arrangements for lesser-known singers. He released the heavy metal album Dean Clea and Emir Hot The Quarterworlds of Fantasia in Serbia.

He also played in the Vivaldi Metal Project.
