= Allan Sørensen =

Danish drummer (born 1973)

- Born: 24 April 1973 (age 51); Copenhagen, Denmark
- Genres: Symphonic rock; progressive rock; hard rock; progressive metal
- Occupation: Drummer
- Instrument: Drums
- Website: www.myspace.com/allansorensen

Allan Sørensen (born 24 April 1973) is a Danish drummer.

== Biography ==
Allan began playing drums at the age of 4, influenced by his parents. In the beginning he was influenced by Danish pop and rock acts. Soon he discovered the world of metal from bands like AC/DC, Kiss, Saxon, Dio, etc. As a teenager he began to take drum lessons from Mikkey Dee (Motörhead/Scorpions). Mikkey became Allan`s mentor and big inspiration for his further career. His skills as a drummer were soon discovered in 1992 by Danish metal band Narita, where he recorded two albums. After that he recorded 2 albums with Prime Time (a band formed by Narita guitarist Henrik Poulsen). In late 1996, when Royal Hunt long-time drummer Kenneth Olsen got sick during the Moving Target tour, André Andersen called Sørensen to fill the drums for them for the rest of the tour. In a matter of 36 hours, Allan managed to fly to Switzerland, rehearse, and hit the stage with the band. He recorded the highly acclaimed PARADOX followed by a world tour with the band, before becoming a full time member. After 2 albums and several tours, Allan left the band in summer 2000, to join the Danish band Cornerstone, featuring Doogie White (ex. Rainbow/Yngwie Malmsteen), with whom he recorded 3 studio albums, 1 live album and did 2 European Tours. In 2007 Allan joins Royal Hunt again and recorded several albums, played several world tours, before he quit in late 2014, to seek new adventures. April 2017, Allan gets a call from Danish hard rockers PRETTY MAIDS, who wants him to audition for the band. Allan becomes a full time member, and the band continues the on-going King Maker tour, which includes several festival/headliner tours through Europe, USA and 2 times in Japan.

== Discography ==
=== Royal Hunt ===
- Paradox (1997)
- Closing the Chapter (1998)
- Fear (1999)
- Intervention (EP) (2000)
- The Watchers (EP) (2001)
- Paper Blood (2005)
- Collision Course: Paradox II (2008)
- X (2010)
- Show Me How To Live (2011)
- A Life To Die For (2013)

=== Cornerstone ===
- Arrival (2000) - Session drums
- Human Stain (2002)
- Once Upon Our Yesterdays (2002)
- Two Tales of One Tomorrow (2007)

=== Narita ===
- Narita 93 (Demo) (1992)
- Changes (1994)
- Life (1996)

=== André Andersen ===
- Changing Skin (1998)

=== Prime Time ===
- The Unknown (1997)
