= Show Me How to Live (album) =

Studio album by Royal Hunt
- Released: (United States) 29 November 2011 (Europe) 2 December 2011 (Japan) 7 December 2011
- Recorded: North Point Studio, Copenhagen, Denmark, May–October 2011,
- Genres: Progressive metal, hard rock
- Length: 42:00
- Labels: Frontiers Records (worldwide), Avalon Marquee (Japan)
- Producer: André Andersen

Royal Hunt chronology
X (2010)	Show Me How to Live (2011)	A Life to Die For (2013)

Show Me How to Live is the eleventh studio album by Royal Hunt. The album marks the return of American singer D.C. Cooper after thirteen years away from the band, as well as the band's return to "classic Royal Hunt sound".

== Track listing ==
All songs written by André Andersen.

1. "One More Day" - 6:12
2. "Another Man Down" - 5:13
3. "An Empty Shell" - 4:32
4. "Hard Rain's Coming" - 5:12
5. "Half Past Loneliness" - 5:36
6. "Show Me How to Live" - 10:03
7. "Angel's Gone" - 5:12

== Personnel ==
=== Band members ===
- D.C. Cooper – vocals
- Jonas Larsen – guitars
- André Andersen – keyboards, producer
- Andreas Passmark – bass
- Allan Sørensen - drums

=== Additional musicians ===
- Kenny Lubcke, Maria McTurk, Alexandra Popova, Michelle Raitzin - backing vocals

== Production ==
- Mixed at Roasting House Studios in Malmö, Sweden
- Recorded at North Point Studio, Denmark.
- Mastering by Jan Eliasson at AudioPlanet in Copenhagen
- Album cover by Kai Brockschmidt

== Reception ==
In Trucking magazine's regular music reviews Shaun Connors wrote, "Music with balls for people with balls," suggesting listeners "Forget Royal Hunt’s pigeonholing prog rock/metal moniker and for SMHTL think more hardish rock with mild symphonic (keyboard-laden) twist, all enhanced by stadium rock level melody and hooks..."

About.com gave the album a four-of-five star rating, commenting: "Royal Hunt does a good job combining hooks and melodies with more intricate arrangements. Songs like “Another Man Down” is memorable and catchy, but also has depth and atmosphere along with some quality guitar work from Jonas Larsen, who has a positive impact on his first album with Royal Hunt."

== Charts ==
Chart (2011)	Peak position
Japanese Albums (Oricon)	58
