= Earth-maker myth =

An elaborate Earth-Maker Story of Creation is a myth that comes from the Native Americans of California, also called the "Story of Creation." This myth describes Earth-maker creating day and night, land, water, and all living things. Men and women were created out of soft clay into which Earth-Maker "breathed life".He also created the seas with his tears. The creation begins:

“In the beginning there was no land, no light, only darkness and the vast waters of Outer Ocean where Earth-Maker and Great-Grandfather were afloat in their canoe... Earth-Maker took soft clay and formed the figure of a man and of a woman, then many men and women, which he dried in the sun and into which he breathed life: they were the First People." (Kroeber 1968:62).

The entire narrative is printed in the book Almost Ancestors: The First Californians by Theodora Kroeber and Robert F. Heizer. The (hardback edition) of the book does not identify the ethnic group who believed in this myth, or an exact narrator.
