= André Andersen =

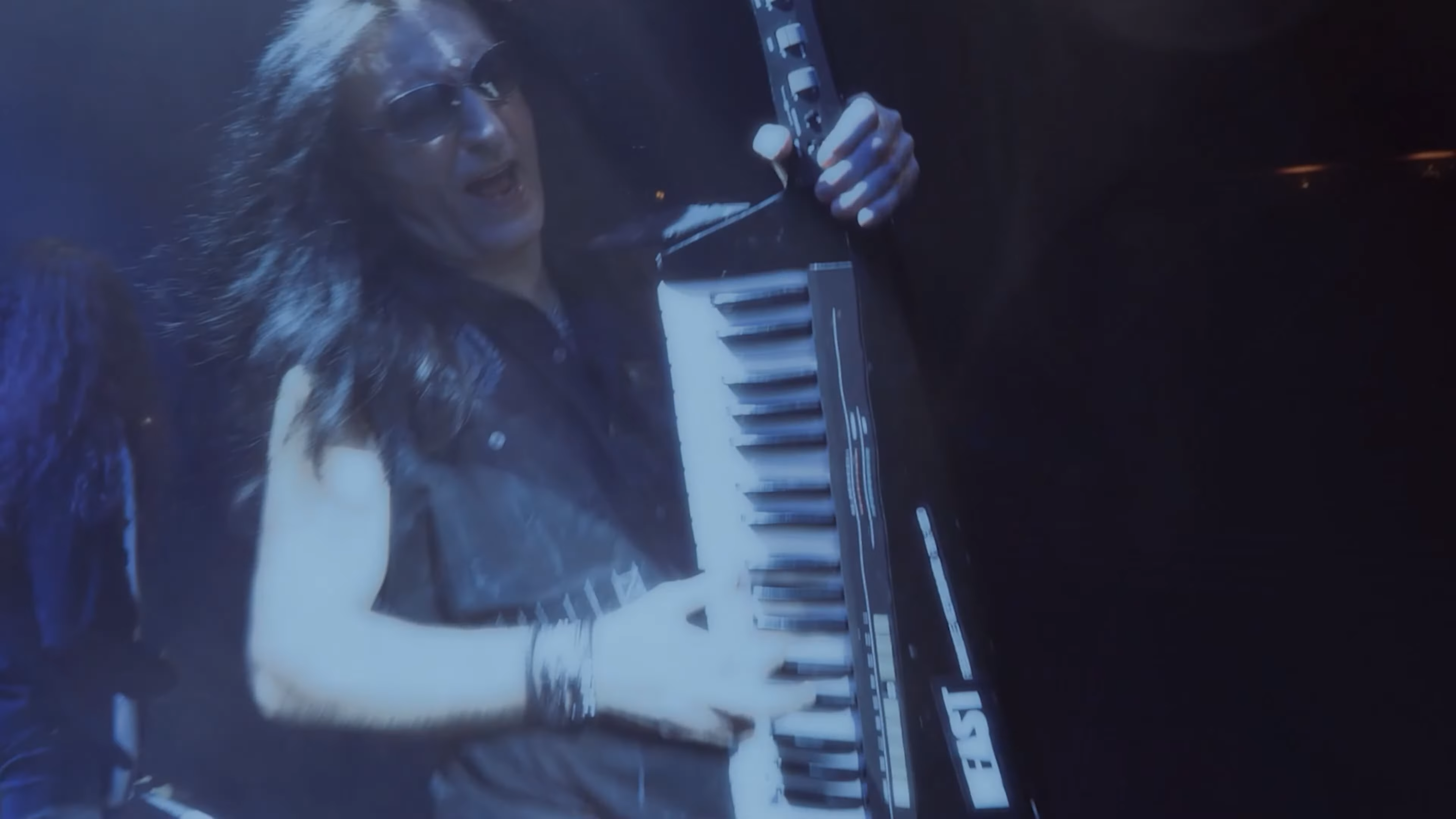
- Andersen in 2024

Background information
- Born: Andrè Andersen; 16 December 1961 (age 64); Moscow, Soviet Union
- Genres: Neo-classical metal; hard rock; progressive metal; power metal
- Occupations: Composer; musician; record producer
- Instruments: Keyboards; piano; keytar; guitar
- Labels: NorthPoint Productions; Frontiers Records; Marquee Avalon
- Member of: Royal Hunt, N-Tribe, Narita
- Website: www.andreandersen.com

André Andersen (born 16 December 1961) is a Russian-born multi-instrumentalist and composer best known as the keyboardist and founder of the Denmark-based progressive metal band Royal Hunt. André started his "music life" at very young age and went the whole circle through studio sessions, live performances and literally anything in between, establishing a remarkable carrier which is still evolving, bringing him to every aspect, every corner of music industry.

== Discography ==
=== Solo albums ===
- Changing Skin (1997)
- Black on Black (2001)
- OceanView (2003)
- Andersen / Laine / Readman - III (Three) (2006)

=== EPs ===
- 1000 Miles Away (1997)
- In the Late Hour (1998)

=== Royal Hunt ===
- Land of Broken Hearts (1992)
- The Maxi Single - EP (1992)
- Clown in the Mirror (1993)
- Far Away - EP (1994)
- Moving Target (1995)
- 1996 (Live Double Album) (1996)
- Paradox - (1997)
- Closing the Chapter - Live Album (1998)
- Fear (1999)
- Intervention - EP (2000)
- The Mission (2001)
- The Watchers (2002)
- Eyewitness (2003)
- Paper Blood (2005)
- 2006 (Live Double Album) (2006)
- Collision Course: Paradox II (2008)
- X (Ten) (2010)
- Show Me How To Live (2011)
- A Life To Die For (2013)
- Devil's Dozen (2015)
- Cargo (Live Double Album) (2016)
- 2016 (Live Double Album) (2017)
- Cast in Stone (2018)
- Dystopia (2020)
- Dystopia part II (2022)

=== Other works ===
- Changes - Narita (1994)
- Crash - Masahiro Chono EP (1995)
- Life - Narita (1996)
- The Unknown - Prime Time (1998)
- Arrival - Cornerstone (2000)
- Wake Up - Keiji Mutoh EP
- Earthmaker - John West (2002)
- BattleCity - Wood Bell Corporation (2002)
- Once Upon Our Yesterdays - Cornerstone (2003)
- Welcome to the Show - Evil Masquerade (2004)
- Theatrical Madness - Evil Masquerade (2005)
- No Compromises - Peter Brander (2010)
- Unlimited Edition - Eclipse Hunter (2011)
- Pictures From A Time Traveller - Marcus Jidell (2013)
- II - Seven Thorns (2014)
- Ever-lasting blue - Aphasia (2017) - Plays on "Into the Fire" and "Crush & Burn", composed "Into the Fire".
- Staring Down The Barrel - N'Tribe (Single) (2018)
- Root'n'Branch - N-Tribe (EP) (2019)
