= Sigma (Italian band) =

Italian metal band

Sigma was an Italian power metal band. They released two albums.

== Discography ==
- Sigma (2000)
- Win or Lose (2003)
