= D. C. Cooper =

American singer

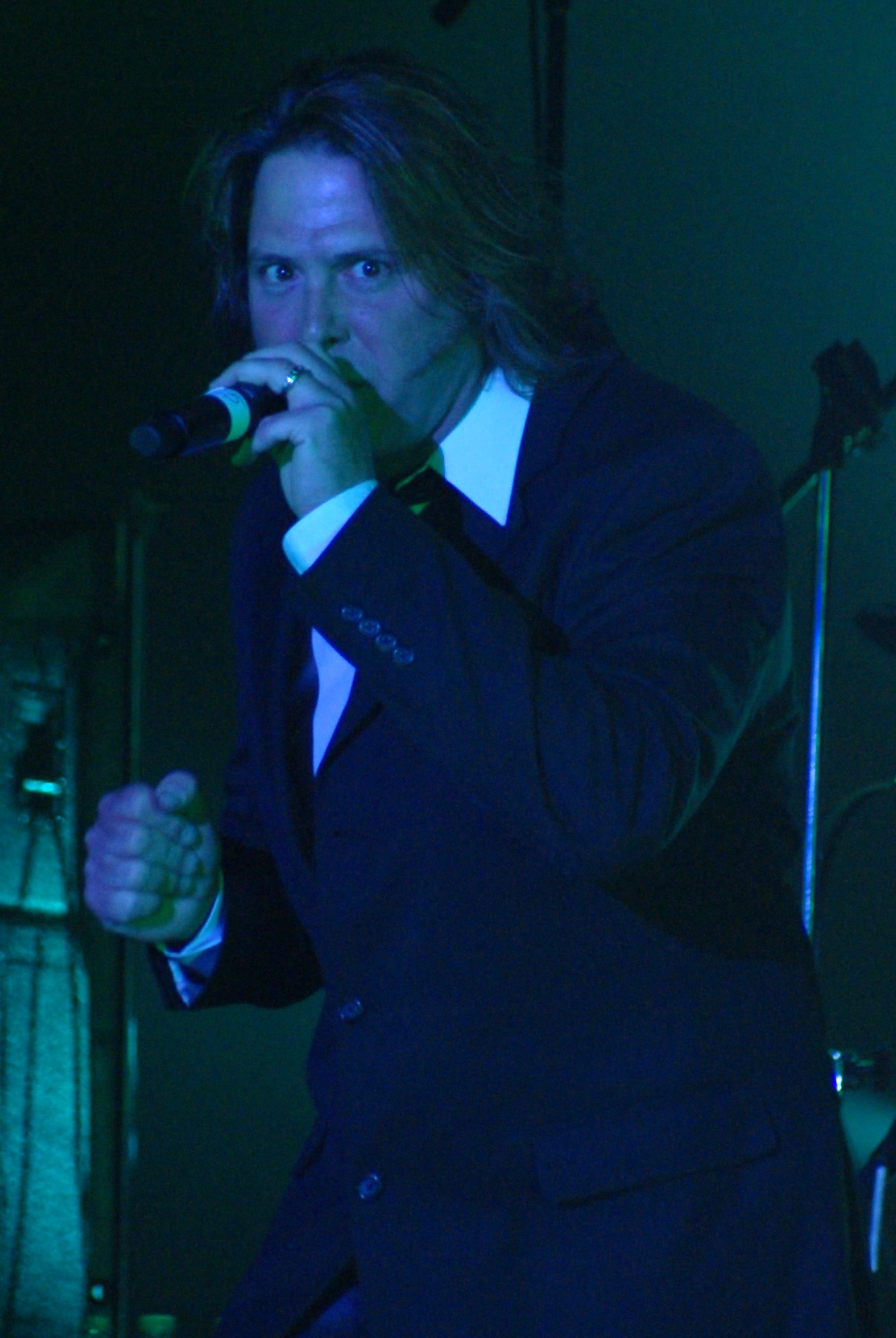
- D C Cooper at RoSfest 2013

Background information
- Born: Donald Christopher Cooper; August 22, 1965 (age 60); Johnstown, Pennsylvania, U.S.
- Occupation: Singer
- Years active: 1989–present
- Website: dccooper.com

Donald Christopher Cooper (born August 22, 1965) is an American singer.

== Career ==
Cooper started his career playing in several local bands and touring local clubs in the Pittsburgh area while studying singing under renowned opera coach Charlotte Coleman. His first thrust into the international spotlight was as a finalist to be Rob Halford's replacement in Judas Priest. Having created a buzz at the auditions, Cooper found himself with offers to sing for many European and American bands. He selected the band Royal Hunt and officially joined the band on December 26, 1994.

After spending four years with Royal Hunt, Cooper was suddenly and unexpectedly fired from the band, which he discovered by reading an announcement on their website. His next project, a solo album that he began in 1998, enlisted the help of musicians from many well known bands (among them guitarist Tore Østby of Conception, and members of Pink Cream 69). He released D. C. Cooper in 1999.

After a successful tour, Cooper formed a new band with former Sinner guitarist Alex Beyrodt called Silent Force. They have released four studio albums of their own. In 2012, Cooper made an announcement saying he was leaving the band and a new line-up was announced in 2013. Cooper was replaced by singer Michael Bormann.

Cooper has recorded guest vocals for Australian progressive metal act Voyager. In 2011 he rejoined Royal Hunt and performed on their Japan and Russian tour. Later the same year it was announced that Cooper would make a new record with the band.

Cooper recorded lead vocals for the Italian band Derdian for their album "Revolution Era".

== Personal life ==
While not on tour, Cooper can frequently be found volunteering as a firefighter in his home state of Pennsylvania.

Cooper is married to Michelle Cooper and the couple has two sons, born in 2003 and 2005.

== Discography ==
=== The Tung Bandits ===
- The Tung Bandits (album) (1990)

=== Solo album ===
- D. C. Cooper (1999)

=== Royal Hunt ===
- Far Away (EP) (1995)
- Moving Target (1995)
- 1996 (1996)
- Paradox (1997)
- Closing the Chapter (1998)
- The Best (1998)
- The Best Live (1998)
- Show Me How To Live (2011)
- A Life to Die For (2013)
- Devil's Dozen (2015)
- Cargo (2016)
- 2016 (2017)
- Cast in Stone (2018)
- Dystopia (2020)
- Dystopia II (2022)

=== Silent Force ===
- The Empire of Future (2000)
- Infatuator (2001)
- Worlds Apart (2004)
- Walk the Earth (2007)

=== Missa Mercuria ===
- Missa Mercuria (2002)

=== Amaran's Plight ===
- Voice in the Light (2007)

=== Guest appearances ===
Artist	Album	Year
Victory	Voiceprint	1996
Shadow Gallery	Tyranny	1998
Explorer's Club	Age of Impact	1998
Pink Cream 69	Electrified	1998
Rage	Unity	2002
Various Artists	Missa Mercuria	2002
Edenbridge	Aphelion	2003
Gary Hughes	Once and Future King Part II	2003
Dol Ammad	Ocean Dynamics	2006
Steel Seal	By the Power of Thunder	2007
Persephone's Dream	Pyre of Dreams	2007
Daniele Liverani's Genius: A Rock Opera	Episode 3: The Final Surprise	2007
Voyager	The Meaning Of I	2011
Derdian	Revolution Era	2016
