= Royal Hunt =

Danish progressive metal band

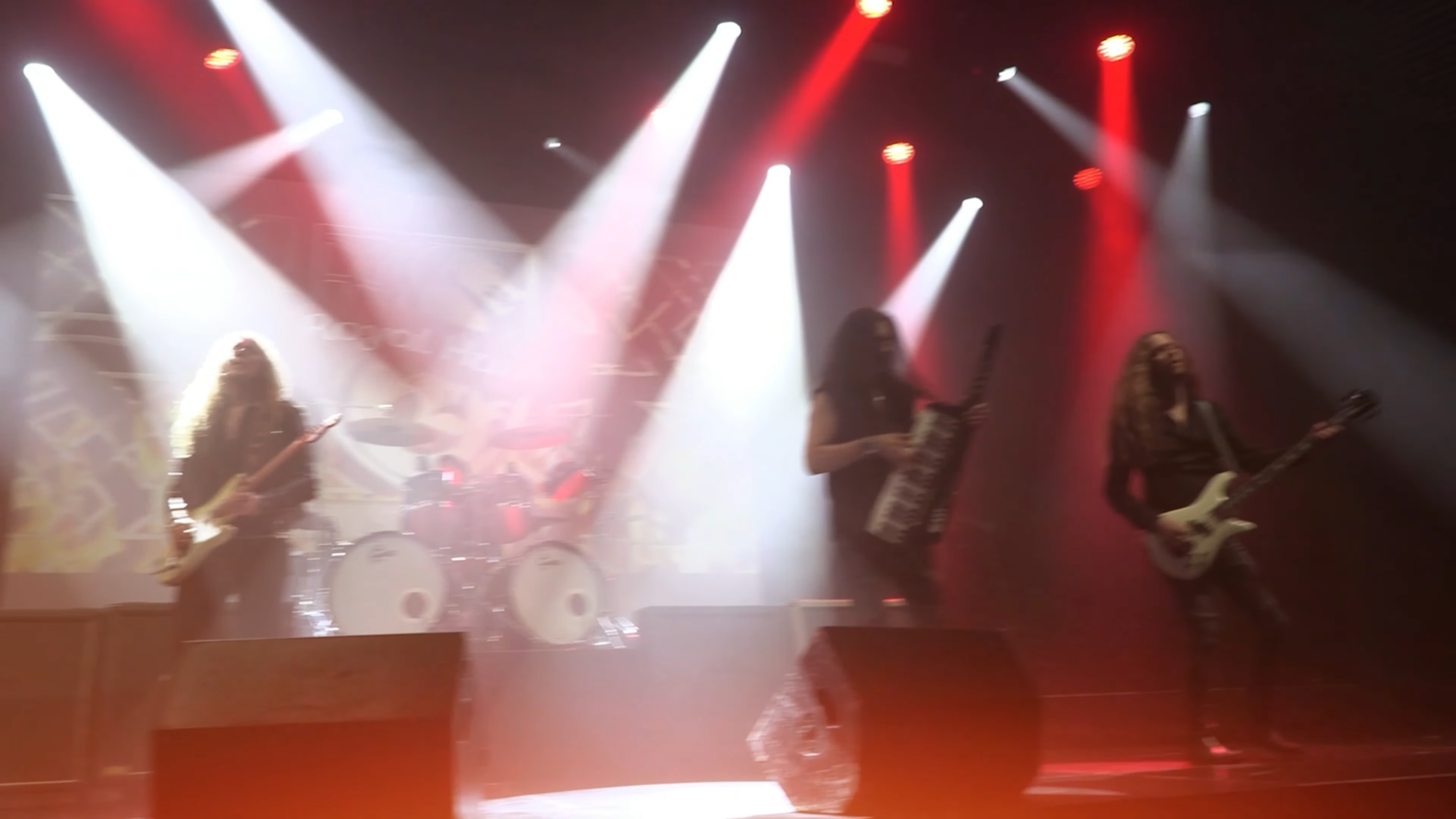
- Royal Hunt performing in 2023

Background information
- Origin: Copenhagen, Denmark
- Genres: Progressive metal; power metal; hard rock
- Years active: 1989–present
- Labels: NorthPoint, Kick, Steamhammer, Semaphore, Magna Carta, Scarlet Frontiers
- Members: André Andersen; D. C. Cooper; Andreas Passmark; Jonas Larsen; Andreas "Habo" Johansson
- Past members: Marcus Jidell; John West; Mark Boals; Henrik Brockmann; Steen Mogensen; Jacob Kjaer; Kenneth Olsen; Per Schelander; Allan Sørensen
- Website: royalhunt.com

Royal Hunt is a Danish progressive metal band, founded in 1989 by keyboardist André Andersen.

== History ==
Royal Hunt is known for creating melodic music with a progressive and symphonic flair. They experienced success mainly in Japan and Europe during the mid-90s with American vocalist D.C. Cooper on their albums Moving Target and Paradox.

Throughout their history the band has experienced multiple lineup changes. In 2007 they acquired singer Mark Boals, who replaced former vocalist John West. In 2011 after requests from fans and promoters worldwide they decided to reunite with their former vocalist D. C. Cooper for a special tour, covering the first four albums of the band. They recorded a new album entitled Show Me How to Live featuring the returning D.C. Cooper as their permanent vocalist moving forward. Cooper also provided vocals for the 2013 album, A Life to Die For, and again provided vocals on "Devil's Dozen", "Cast In Stone" and "Dystopia – Part 1".

In October 2021, the group announced the completion of songwriting for the new album – "Dystopia – Part 2". The album will be released on 28 October 2022.

For festival appearances in 2024, the band was scheduled to perform with a line-up including their former lead vocalist Mark Boals and Statement's drummer Daniel Rasch Nielsen. Boals and Nielsen are temporarily covering for Cooper and Johansson due to the latter's scheduling conflicts. The Boals/Nielsen-incorporating lineup will play at Leyendas Del Rock in Spain on August 7 and at Jailbreak Festival in Denmark on August 17. The band was crowdfunding towards the recording of a new EP in 2025.

In Japan, the band is famous for the song Martial Arts, which was used as entrance music for professional wrestler Masahiro Chono.

== Members ==
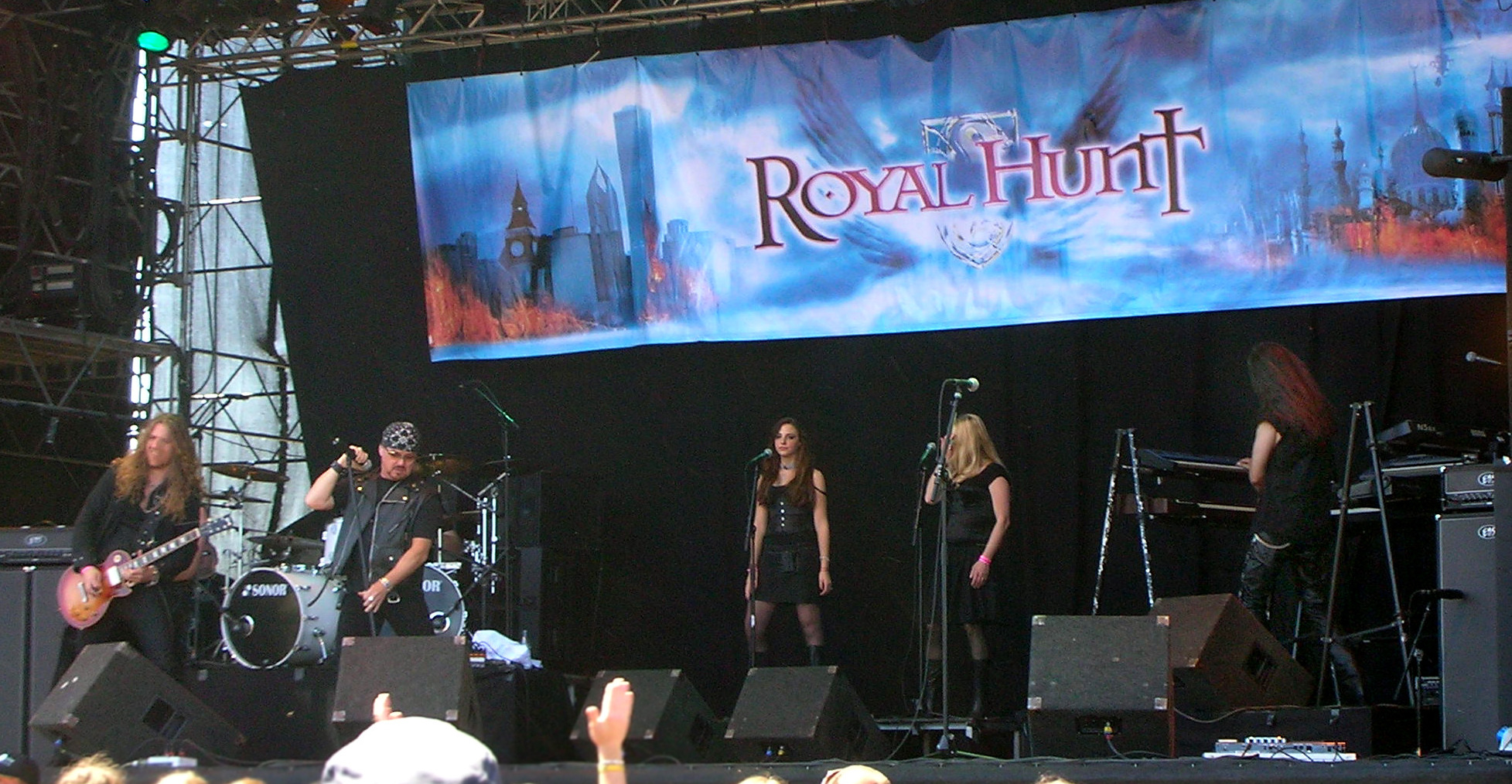
Royal Hunt at Sweden Rock Festival 2008

=== Current members ===
- André Andersen – keyboards, piano, keytar, rhythm guitar (1989–present)
- D. C. Cooper – lead vocals (1994–1999, 2011–present)
- Andreas Passmark – bass (2009–present)
- Jonas Larsen – lead guitar (2011–present)
- Andreas "Habo" Johansson – drums (2015–present)

=== Former members ===
- Steen Mogensen – bass (1989–2003)
- Kenneth Olsen – drums (1989–1996; 2004–2007)
- Henrik Brockmann – vocals (1989–1994)
- Jacob Kjaer – lead guitar (1993–2003)
- Allan Sørensen – drums (1996–2002; 2007–2015)
- John West – vocals (1999–2007)
- Allan Tschicaja – session drums (2002–2004)
- Marcus Jidell – lead guitar, cello (2004–2011)
- Per Schelander – bass (2005–2009) (Covered for Andreas Passmark during parts of the tour 2015 and during the tour 2016)
- Mark Boals – vocals (2007–2011, 2024 (festival appearances only))

== Discography ==
=== Studio albums ===
- Land of Broken Hearts (1992)
- Clown in the Mirror (1994)
- Moving Target (1996)
- Paradox (1997)
- Fear (1999)
- The Mission (2001)
- Eyewitness (2003)
- Paper Blood (2005)
- Collision Course... Paradox 2 (2008)
- X (2010)
- Show Me How to Live (2011)
- A Life to Die For (2013)
- Devil's Dozen (2015)
- Cast in Stone (2018)
- Dystopia (2020)
- Dystopia – Part II (2022)

=== Live albums ===
- 1996 (1996)
- Closing the Chapter (1998)
- Double Live in Japan (1999)
- 2006 Live (2006)
- Cargo (Live) (2016)
- 2016 Live (2017)

=== Singles/EPs ===
- The Maxi – Single (1994)
- Far Away (1995)
- "Message to God" (1997)
- Intervention (2000)

=== Compilations ===
- The First 4 Chapters... and More (Japan release) (1998)
- The Best (Japan release) (1998)
- The Best Live (Japan release) (1998)
- The Watchers (2001)
- On the Mission 2002 (Japan release) (2002)
- Heart of the City (Best of 1992–1999) (2012)
- 20th Anniversary (2012)
