= Svarta ballader (album) =

Studio album by Sofia Karlsson
- Released: 12 February 2005
- Recorded: 2004, Kling and Klangs mobila
- Genre: Folk music
- Label: Bonnier Amigo Music Group
- Producer: Göran Petersson, Sigge Krantz, Sofia Karlsson

Sofia Karlsson chronology
'Folk Songs' (2002)	Svarta ballader (2005)	Visor från vinden (2007)

Svarta ballader ("Black Ballads") is the classically-trained Swedish folk musician Sofia Karlsson's second studio album, released in 2005. On the disc she exclusively interprets poems written by the Swedish proletarian school author Dan Andersson; five of the eleven poems are from his 1917 collection Svarta ballader. The poems are set to music by different composers, including the singers Gunnar Turesson, Gunde Johansson, and Thorstein Bergman; the musician Sven Scholander; a member of Karlsson's band, Sofie Livebrant, and Karlsson herself; while one song was set by Andersson. Karlsson and her band arranged all the songs, with novel instrumentation including cello, trumpet, bass clarinet, piano and percussion.

The album became Karlsson's breakthrough; it was warmly welcomed by critics, who described her as a great Swedish folk singer, and the album as revealing the meaning of familiar songs, hidden by traditional interpretations. It was awarded several prizes, including a Grammis in 2006, a Manifestgalan prize in 2006, and the Dan Andersson prize in 2008. She followed up the launch by touring with the album's songs for two years. The album reached a peak placing of 6 in the Swedish charts in 2005, remaining in the top list for 54 weeks. Over 60,000 copies of the album have been sold in Sweden, an exceptional number for that country.

== Background ==
=== Sofia Karlsson ===
Sofia Karlsson is a classically-trained Swedish folk singer and musician, born in 1975. She studied at the Royal College of Music in Stockholm. She has produced several albums of folk music, starting with Folk Songs in 2002. She has won numerous prizes including the 2005, 2007, 2009, and 2011 Grammis, for her albums Svarta Ballader, Visor från vinden, Söder om kärleken, and Levande); the Dan Andersson Prize in 2008; the Prince Eugene Culture Prize in 2009; the Ulla Billquist Stipend in 2010; the Troubadour Prize in 2013; and Stockholm City's Culture Prize in 2015. Her singing style has been described as nuanced and delicate. She is able to accompany herself on a variety of instruments including guitar, bouzouki, Hammond organ, harmonium, and flute.

=== Dan Andersson ===
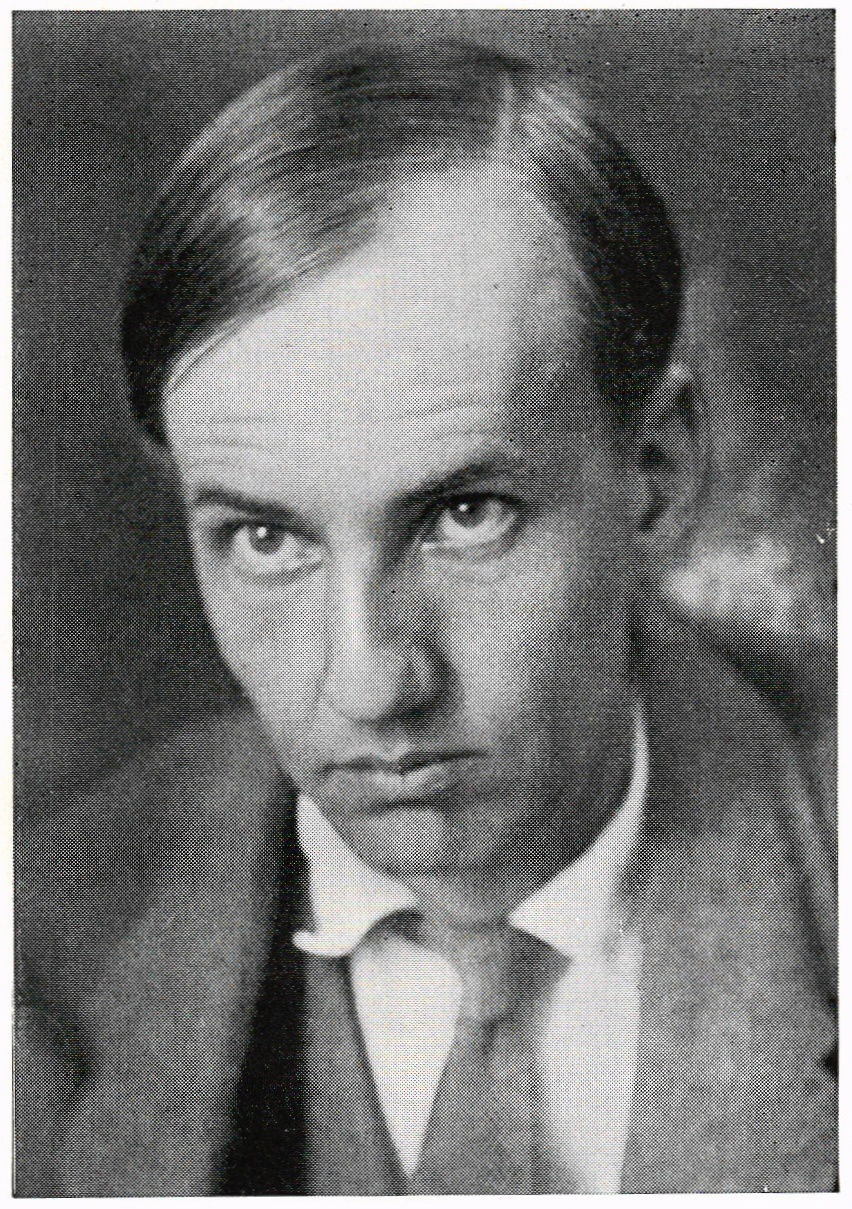
The Swedish proletarian poet Dan Andersson (1888–1920) wrote the poems that Sofia Karlsson sings on the album.

All the lyrics on the album are poems by the Swedish proletarian school author Dan Andersson. He was born in a village in the forested Dalarna province, and grew up in poverty; his father was a primary school teacher, taking odd jobs to try to earn enough money to live on. Andersson was sent to Forest Lake, Minnesota when he was 14 to see if the family could move there for a better life. He reported that things were no better there, and returned home. In 1918 he married Olga Turesson, sister to the troubadour Gunnar Turesson, who later set one of Andersson's poems, "Jag väntar..." (the first track of the album), to music. The family moved to a log cabin named Luossa in Skattlösberg; the name occurs in the title of one of the best-known songs, Omkring tiggarn från Luossa (Around the beggar from Luossa). Andersson became well-educated, writing poems and translating texts such as Charles Baudelaire's French into Swedish. He set a few of his poems to music. The album's title and several of the poems are taken from a 1917 poetry book by Andersson.

Verse 2 of Omkring tiggarn från Luossa, one of the Svarta ballader
Dan Andersson, 1917

'Det är något bortom bergen, bortom blommorna och sången,
det är något bakom stjärnor, bakom heta hjärtat mitt.
Hören — något går och viskar, går och lockar mig och beder:
Kom till oss, ty denna jorden den är icke riket ditt!'

Translation

'There is something beyond the hills, beyond the flowers and the song,
there is something behind the stars, behind my blazing breast.
Listen! — something comes and whispers, comes and tempts me and beseeches:
Come to us, for this dull planet is not your lasting rest!'

== Tracks ==
The album's tracks were recorded in 2004 in various Stockholm venues. All the lyrics are poems by Dan Andersson. The music and arrangements are as follows:

No.	Title	Source	Translation	Length	Composer	Arranged by	Recorded at
1	Jag väntar...	Kolvaktarens visor	I am waiting	4:07	Gunnar Turesson	Karlsson, Esbjörn Hazelius	Gammelgården, Ösmo
2	Vaggvisa	manuscript, 1914-1915	Lullaby	4:19	Sofie Livebrant	Karlsson	Gammelgården, Ösmo
3	Jag har drömt...	Svarta ballader	I dreamt	3:26	Karlsson	Karlsson	Gammelgården, Ösmo
4	Omkring tiggarn från Luossa	Svarta ballader	Around the beggar from Luossa	4:18	Gunde Johansson	Karlsson, Oskar Schönning	Gammelgården, Ösmo
5	Julvisa i Finnmarken	Efterlämnade dikter	Christmas song in Finnmark	3:15	Thorstein Bergman	Karlsson	Gammelgården, Ösmo
6	Vaknatt	Svarta ballader	Wakeful night	2:15	Thorstein Bergman	Karlsson	Home recording by Sofie Livebrant
7	Du liv	Kolvaktarens visor	You, life	4:47	Sofie Livebrant	Karlsson	The Capsule
8	Till min syster	Svarta ballader	To my sister	2:17	Dan Andersson	Karlsson	Atlantis Studios
9	Helgdagskväll i timmerkojan	Kolvaktarens visor	Holiday evening in a log cabin	6:07	Sven Scholander	Karlsson, Oskar Schönning	Gammelgården, Ösmo
10	Mot ljuset	Baudelaire översättningar	To the light	3:47	Sofie Livebrant	Karlsson	Gammelgården, Ösmo
11	Minnet	Svarta ballader	Memory	3:05	Thorstein Bergman	Karlsson	Gammelgården, Ösmo

== Composition process ==
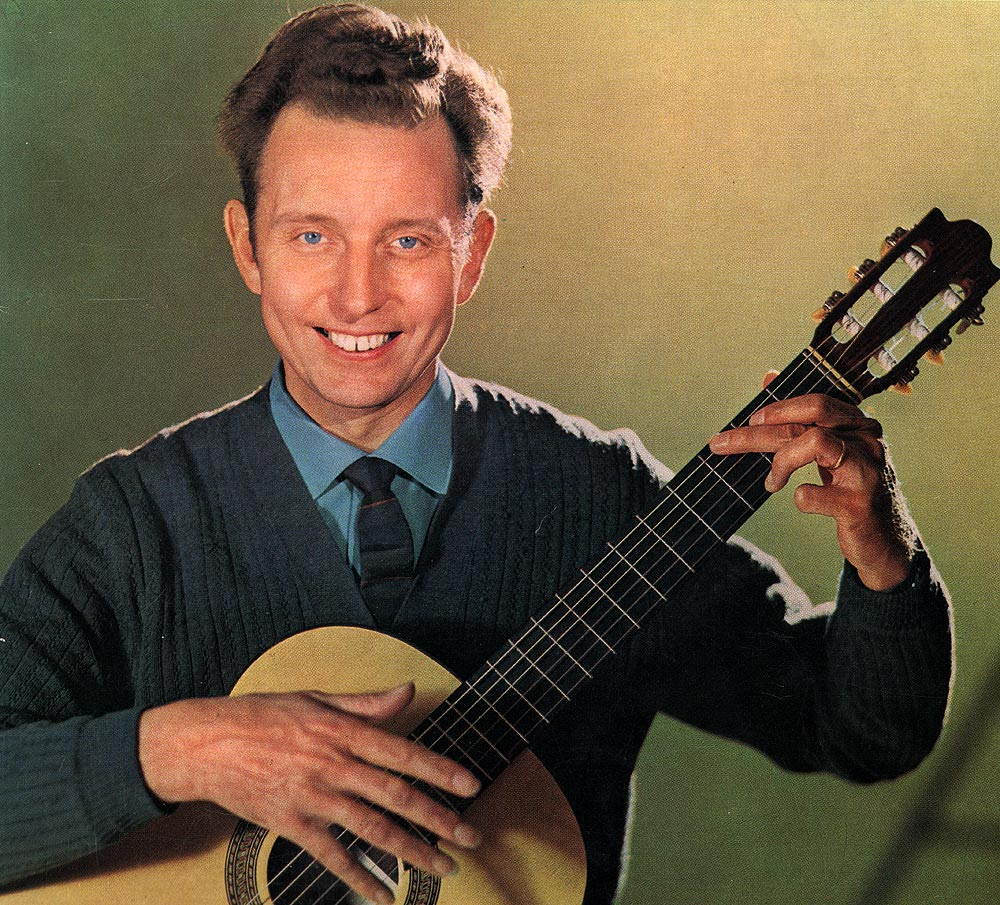
Gunde Johansson set Omkring tiggarn från Luossa to music.

The album makes use of settings of Andersson's work by several composers. Three of the songs on the album use the musical settings composed by the Swedish songwriter and troubadour Thorstein Bergman; the album has been compared to his 1987 album (titled Dan Andersson), re-released on CD in 2008. Bergman accompanied himself with an acoustic guitar, with an orchestral backing; both he and Karlsson have been described as among the finest interpreters of Andersson, though Karlsson's choice to give Andersson a woman's voice necessarily creates a quite different effect.

Karlsson sings Omkring tiggarn från Luossa to the setting composed by the Swedish singer Gunde Johansson; he performed the song in ballad style, accompanied only by his acoustic guitar, on his 1963 album Dan Anderssons Dikter Och Visor. The setting to Jag väntar... was composed by the Swedish troubadour and painter Gunnar Turesson. He recorded the song in 1941. Helgdagskväll i timmerkojan was set to music by the Swedish singer, musician and sculptor Sven Scholander, known for his solo performances of Carl Michael Bellman's 18th century Fredman's Epistles. He recorded the song in the 1930s, accompanying himself in Bellmanesque style on the Swedish lute.

Of the remaining songs, three were set to music by Sofie Livebrant, who plays piano on the album, while one setting, Jag har drömt..., was composed by Karlsson herself. All the songs have been arranged by Karlsson in folk style, with varied accompaniments including fiddle, guitar, trumpet, cello, double bass, and percussion. On one track, Jag har drömt..., Hazelius plays a saw.

== Reception ==
The album was very well received. Chris Nickson on AllMusic comments that it was "her breakthrough album", and that she spent the next two years touring with its songs. Göran Holmquist, in his review in Helsingborgs Dagblad, gave the disc a rating of 4/5, writing that "with her fingertip-sensitive arrangements she brings Dan Andersson's poetry about dreams, breakup and longing to our time." The review in FolkWorld called the album "serious and intense". Peter Dahlgren, writing on Dagensskiva.com, acclaimed the album and awarded it 10/10. He stated that "Sofia Karlsson has built a bridge to my childhood encounter with Dan Andersson. The romantic, primeval forest's loneliness and longing for intimacy." Rootsy.nu wrote that "hereby Black ballads and Sofia Karlsson are appointed to 2005's best albums in the genres Swedish song and folk music." Jan Andersson wrote in Göteborgs-Posten that Karlsson had above all created the best album of Dan Andersson interpretations since Thorstein Bergman's 1967 Helgdagskväll i timmerkojan.

Magnus Eriksson, reviewing the album for Svenska Dagbladet, wrote that the whole album was characterised by incredible attention to detail, creating an intense musical expression of Andersson's songs. He had, Eriksson wrote, set only a few of his poems to music, including "Till min syster", but Gunnar Turesson, Gunde Johansson and Thorstein Bergman had created fine settings of several others, and these had entered the Swedish song tradition. Karlsson had in Erikssor's view broadened the range of Andersson interpretations with her folk music background, the settings of her pianist, Sofie Livebrant, and the different styles and tempos in the album.

Staffan Jonsson, in a review for RootsWorld, called Karlsson a great Swedish folk singer. He noted that the selection of Andersson's work represented the settings of seven different composers, making the album varied and full of personality, with diverse instrumentation, some of it unusual. All the tracks, though, were in Jonsson's opinion united by Karlsson's "warm and caring voice", presenting Andersson's century-old words in a "young and natural" way. The combination of voice and music became "magical" in Omkring tiggarn från Luossa, and the last track, Minnet, was in Jonsson's view "stunning": he thought Andersson would be smiling.

Sonoloco reviewer Ingvar Loco Nordin praised the album as "a revelation", placing Karlsson as one of the great Andersson interpreters, alongside Gunde Johansson and Thorstein Bergman. In his view, Karlsson had revealed the meaning of the too-familiar texts, hidden in plain sight by the traditional style of interpretation. The first song, Jag väntar ..., one of the most traditional of Swedish ballads, appeared to Nordin as wholly new. Omkring tiggarn från Luossa, too, was in his View astonishingly free of the cultural accretion around such an iconic song, an upbeat version that Nordin, a musician, states he could never have imagined. Helgdagskväll i timmerkojan reworked what he called another "emblematic song' with a fast background beat that steadily moved into the foreground, and novel instrumentation (fiddle, cello, trumpet, bass clarinet, piano, double bass, and percussion).

== Sales and prizes ==
The album brought Karlsson both popular attention and prizes. In 2006, she won a Swedish "Grammis" award (for 2005 work) in the category Årets visa, "Song of the Year". In 2006 she won the prize in the category of "folk/world music" at Manifestgalan. The statement read "With a blending of Swedish song tradition, folk-musical precision and playful borrowing of genres, Sofia Karlsson's album Black ballads made Dan Andersson unmissable for yet another generation." In 2008 Karlsson was awarded the Dan Andersson prize. In her acceptance speech, she said "For me, this is the best prize you can get. It is awarded by people who love Dan Andersson, his poetic quality and his work. And it is given to people who love Dan Andersson, his life and work. So there is a prize handed out as much of and for love, as the effort and success. So for me this is the best prize I can get."

The album has sold over 60,000 copies in Sweden, an exceptional number in that country. The album reached a peak placing of 6 in the Swedish charts in 2005, staying in the top list for 54 weeks; as of 2022 it has remained one of the top 100 Swedish albums in the 1975–onwards category.

== Participants ==
Musicians

- Ale Möller – mandolin, accordion and harmonica
- Emil Strandberg – trumpet
- Esbjörn Hazelius – cittern, guitar, violin and saw
- Lena Willemark – voice
- Leo Svensson – cello
- Lisa Rydberg – violin
- Mikael Augustsson – bandoneon
- Nils Berg – bass clarinet
- Nils Röhlke – pedal steel guitar
- Oskar Schönning – double bass
- Sara Isaksson – voice
- Sebastian Notini – percussion
- Sofia Karlsson – voice, bouzouki and harmonium, producer
- Sofie Livebrant – piano
- Thorstein Bergman – voice, guitar

Others

- Claes Persson – mastering
- Göran Greider – text
- Göran Petersson producer
- Helena Andersson – hair, make-up
- Jeff Ganellen – translation
- Johan Månsson – graphics
- Karin Olebjörk – stylist
- Magnus Selander – photography
- Rogelio de Badajoz Duran – voice coach
- Sigge Krantz – producer, mixing
