= Svarta ballader =

1917 poetry collection by Dan Andersson

Svarta ballader: Dikter
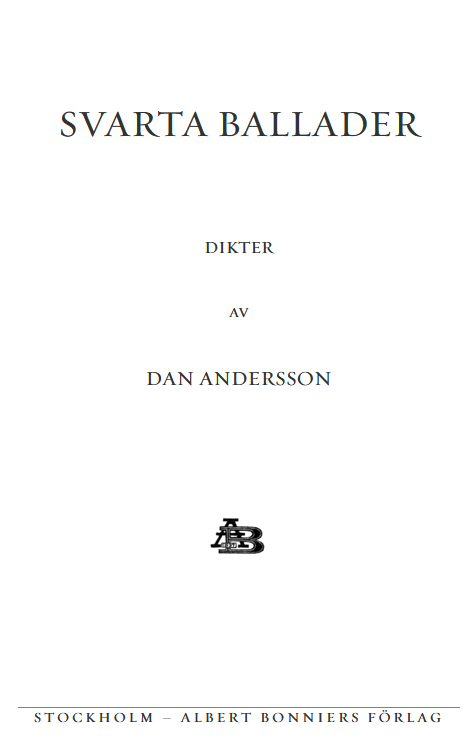
- First edition
- Author: Dan Andersson
- Language: Swedish
- Genre: Poetry
- Published: 1917
- Publisher: Albert Bonniers Förlag
- Media type: Print

Svarta ballader ('Black Ballads') is a 1917 poetry collection by the Swedish proletarian writer Dan Andersson, his third and the last to be published before his early death in 1920. It has become one of the most important texts in 20th century Swedish literature. The poems convey strong feelings about life's struggles, love, hate, suffering, and death. They are framed in nature-romanticism, set in Andersson's wild rural home region of Dalarna. Several have a musician as a central figure, close to Andersson himself, while others show social sympathy for beggars and outcasts. The core theme, however, is religious, with a combination of Christian longing for eternity and Indian nirvana mysticism.

Many of the poems have been set to music and recorded as songs by 20th century composers and singer-songwriters, including by Andersson, Gunnar Turesson, Gunde Johansson, Thorstein Bergman, and Sven Scholander. The singer Sofia Karlsson's 2005 album, Svarta Ballader, interpreted five poems from the book. The 1972 Hootenanny Singers recording of the first song in the book, "Omkring tiggarn från Luossa", remained on the Swedish charts for an exceptional 52 weeks.

== Author ==
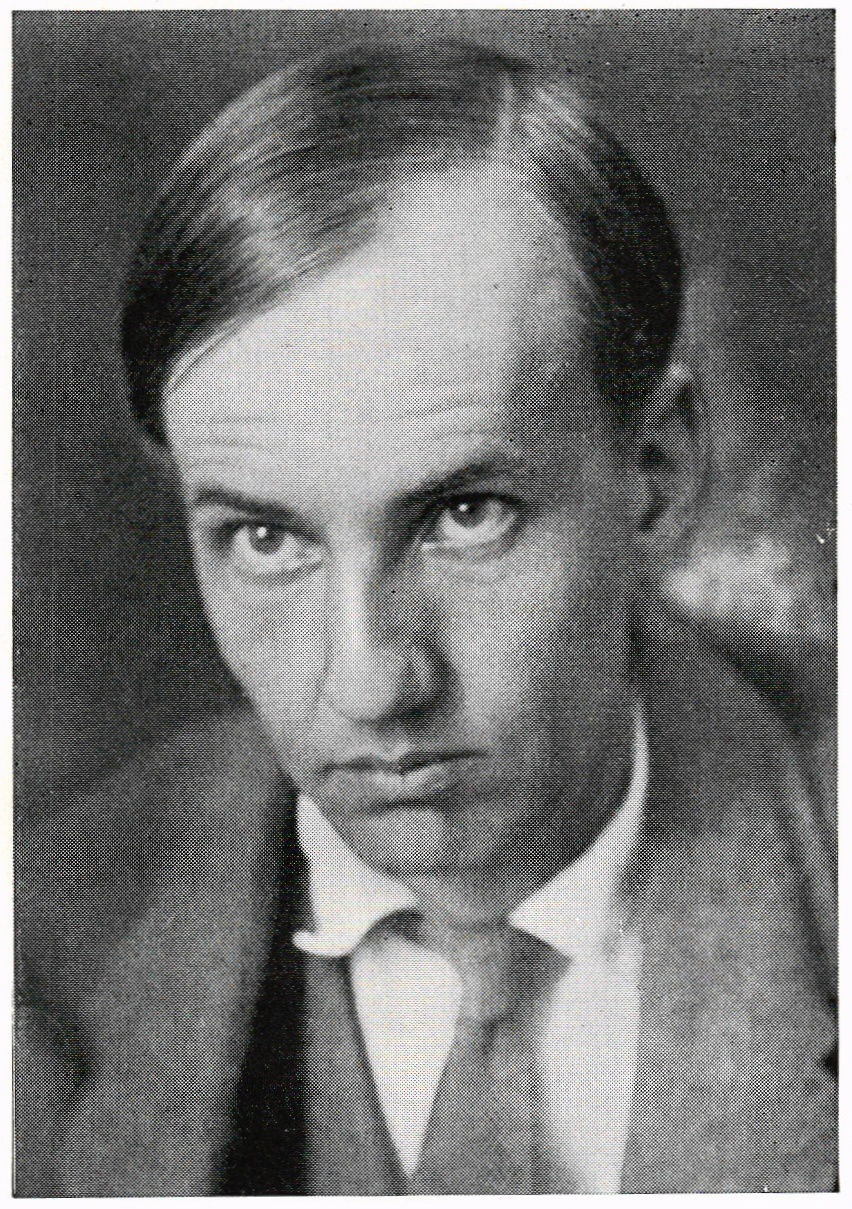
The book's author, the Swedish poet Dan Andersson (1888–1920)

The book's author was the Swedish proletarian school author Dan Andersson. He was born in a village in the forested Dalarna province, and grew up in poverty; his father was a primary school teacher, taking odd jobs to try to earn enough money to live on. Andersson was sent to Forest Lake, Minnesota when he was 14 to see if the family could move there for a better life. He reported that things were no better there, and returned home. He published three poetry books in his lifetime: Kolarhistorier (Charcoal Stories, 1914), Kolvaktarens visor (The Charcoal-burner's Songs, 1915), and Svarta Ballader (1917). In 1918 he married Olga Turesson, sister to the troubadour Gunnar Turesson. The family moved to a log cabin named Luossa in Skattlösberg; the name occurs in the title of one of his best-known poems, Omkring tiggarn från Luossa (Around the beggar from Luossa). Andersson became well-educated, writing poems and translating texts such as Charles Baudelaire's 1857 Les Fleurs du mal into Swedish. He died aged 32 of accidental poisoning in a hotel in Stockholm in 1920. His wife Olga was pregnant at the time, and in 1921 gave birth to a daughter, Monica (married name Sedell). He was not well known in his lifetime, becoming famous after his death. By 1970 he was one of Sweden's best-known and most loved poets.

== Publication history ==
Andersson had such difficulty finding a publisher that he accepted Albert Bonniers Förlag's offer of 25 copies of the book as his sole payment. Bonniers brought out Svarta ballader in Stockholm in 1917. New editions were printed by Zinderman in 1975 and 1992; by Niloe in 1977 and 1981; and by the Sublunar Society in 2018.

== Contents ==
From Svarta ballader: the third stanza of "En spelmans jordafärd"
Dan Andersson, 1917

Men när kistan vaggar svart genom vårens gröna skog,
går en tystnad genom morgonvaknad teg,
och då stannar västanvinden för att lyssna vem som tog
mitt i rosorna så stora tunga steg.
Det är bara Olle spelman, susar tall och sjunger gran,
han har lyktat sina hemlösa år. —
Det var lustigt, svarar vinden, om jag vore en orkan,
jag skulle spela hela vägen där han går!

"A fiddler's farewell" by John Irons, 2020

But as blackly rocks the coffin through the woods in springtime green
silence moves through farm plots woken by the dawn,
and the west wind stops a moment to make out with senses keen
who through roses took steps heavy and forlorn.
It is only Fiddler Olle, sings the spruce and sighs the pine
he has ceased to chase his years without a home. –
Strange, the wind replies, if I just like a hurricane could whine,
I would play the whole long way he now must roam!

Svarta ballader contains 28 poems. They describe the life of people outcast from society such as beggars and released prisoners, sailors in a tavern, an old man, and a man on his deathbed. Among the poems are some of his best-known, including "Omkring tiggarn från Luossa" and "En spelmans jordafärd". "En strof till Huck Finns minne" (actually 4 stanzas, not one) expresses a romantic Swedish view of Huckleberry Finn's America.

The poems and their settings
| Poem | Translated title | Set to music by |
|---|---|---|
| Omkring tiggarn från Luossa | Around the beggar from Luossa | Josef Jonsson 1938; Gunde Johansson 1954 |
| En spelmans jordafärd | A musician's funeral procession | Dan Andersson; Sven Scholander 1924; Lars-Erik Larsson 1927; Gunnar Turesson 1939; Evert Taube 1948 |
| Spelmannen | The musician | Ragnar Ågren 1938; Thorstein Bergman 1967 |
| Karis-Janken | Karis-Janken, a musician | Dan Viktor Andersson 2007 |
| Tiggar-Stinas middagssång | Beggar-Stina's dinner song | Erik Löfmarck 2017 |
| Jägarnas vaggsång | The hunters' lullaby | |
| Ung Harald | Young Harald | |
| Tiggaren Simons sång | The beggar Simon's song | |
| Hemlös | Homeless | Erik Löfmarck 1997 |
| Visa | Song | Erik Löfmarck 1997 |
| Vaknatt | Wakeful night | Thorstein Bergman 1967 |
| När mor dog | When mother died | Erik Löfmarck 2017 |
| En strof till Huck Finns minne | A stanza in memory of Huck Finn | |
| Minnet | Memory | Thorstein Bergman 1967 |
| Till min syster | To my sister | Dan Andersson |
| En gamling | An old man | |
| Syner | Visions | |
| Predikaren | The preacher | |
| Fången | The prisoner | Monica Sedell (Andersson's daughter) |
| Den druckne matrosens sång | The drowned sailors' song | Joakim Thåström 2008 |
| Vår döde vän | Our dead friend | Christer Lindén 2013 |
| Purgatorium | Purgatory | |
| Angelika | Angelica | |
| Kvarnsången | The grindstone song | |
| En tröstesam visa till idealisten och läraren Angelman | A comforting song for the idealist and teacher Angelman | Sven Scholander 1924 |
| Jag har drömt... | I dreamt... | Sofia Karlsson 2005 |
| Vaggsången vid Kestina | Lullaby to Kestina | |
| Gillet på vinden | The guest in the attic, a ghost story | Erik Löfmarck 2017 |

== Reception ==
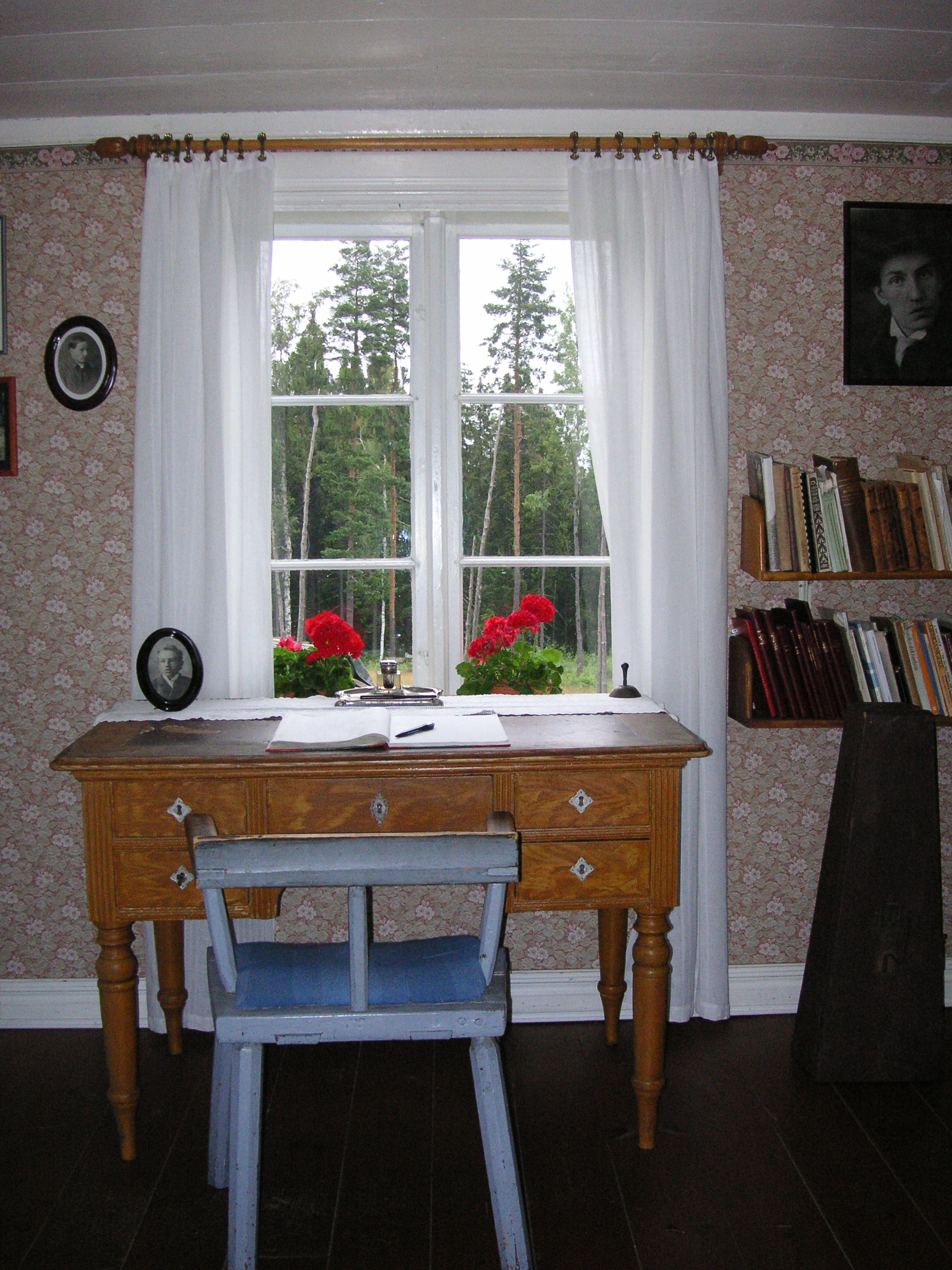
Andersson's writing-desk in Luossa cottage

Since Andersson's death, Svarta ballader has become one of the most significant books in 20th century Swedish literature. The book was ranked 87 in a 2012 survey among the audience of the Swedish literary TV series Röda rummet.

As early as 1922, the author Torsten Fogelqvist wrote that Andersson's poems, especially those of Svarta ballader, were the most artistically distinctive of his works, and predicted that the book would be an essential item for scholars of modern literature.

Per Arne Henricson, in the companion to Swedish literature Berömda svenska böcker: en litterär uppslagsbok (Famous Swedish books: a literary reference book) comments that Andersson is not one of Sweden's greatest poets but has become popular, especially through Svarta ballader. He states that the book's songs (in the visa tradition) have a rhythm and melody that has attracted musical settings, which are often very attractive. In addition, he writes, the poems convey strong, simple feelings about the deepest questions of existence: life's struggles against adversity, love, hate, suffering, and death. He notes that Andersson adds to this a frame of nature-romanticism with a strong wild country mysticism and the Dalarna region's many exotic Finnish names for rivers, lakes, and villages. A central figure in Svarta ballader is the musician, who he notes is close to Andersson, appearing in "Omkring Tiggarn från Luossa", "En spelmans jordafärd", "Spelmannen", and "Karis-Janken". He observes that in other poems, a social sympathy is evident, such as for the beggar Simon and his hungry mother who worked for the rich. But despite all of this, he argues, the strongest theme in the book is religious. In what he considers the best poems in the collection, "Omkring Tiggarn från Luossa" and "Gillet på vinden", a note is struck which combines Christian longing for eternity with Indian nirvana mysticism.

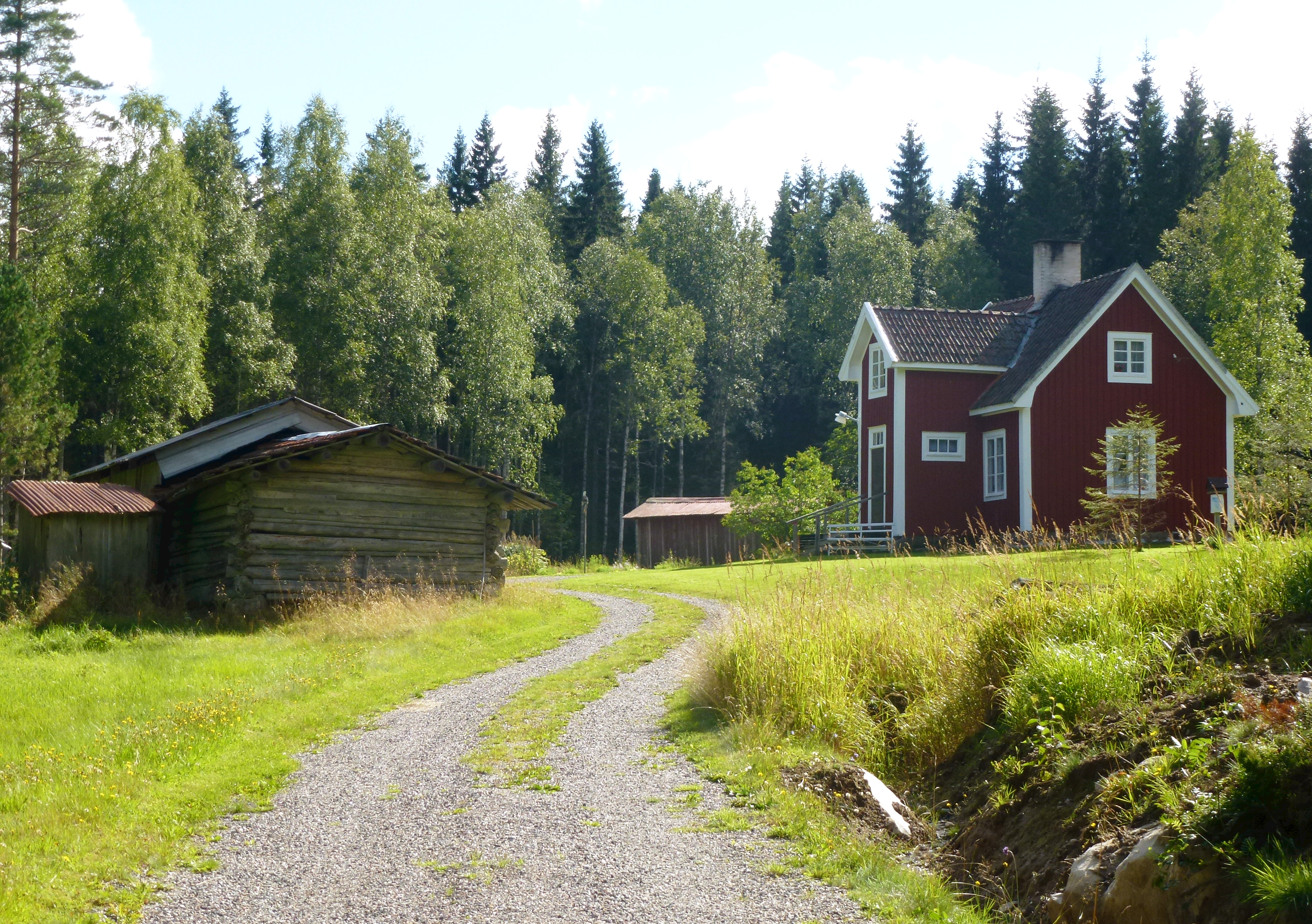
The poems are set in the wild Dalarna countryside. One of the places named is Kestina, home of Andersson's aunt Stina.

Lena Marklund, on the literary Project Runeberg, wrote that Svarta ballader marked Andersson's transition from the concrete descriptions in his earlier books of poems to the metaphysical. He continued to write poems about the wild countryside ("vildmarkspoesi"), but by focussing on solitary and ragged figures, he was able to use their life struggles in a hard world to provide an answer to metaphysical questions. In her view, he made use of every imaginable effect to express the unsayable, from typography and unfamiliar Finnish placenames to romantic phrases like "the darkest dark" and musical resonances. She gives as example "En spelmans jordafärd" (A musician's last journey), which creates the illusion of a torrent of orchestral music with its contrapuntal structure, rhythm, and ingenious rhymes. However, Marklund states, the deepest feature of Svarta ballader is Andersson's inner determination to free himself from a traditional view of God tied up with sin, grace, and penance.

The author and Swedish Academy member Lotta Lotass writes that the dark poems of Svarta ballader "shimmer with the longing for an elusive beyond". In her view, that longing forms a pervasive thread in Andersson's poetry, which constantly investigates the soul's environment after death, using both Christian and Buddhist symbolism. She has described the first poem in the book, "Omkring tiggarn från Luossa" as the key to the whole of Anderson's work. The poem was set to music, and the 1972 recording by the Hootenanny Singers remained on the Swedish charts for an exceptional 52 weeks. Fogelqvist commented that both the first poem and the last ("Gillet på vinden") spoke of the same unheard song beyond all sound and substance:

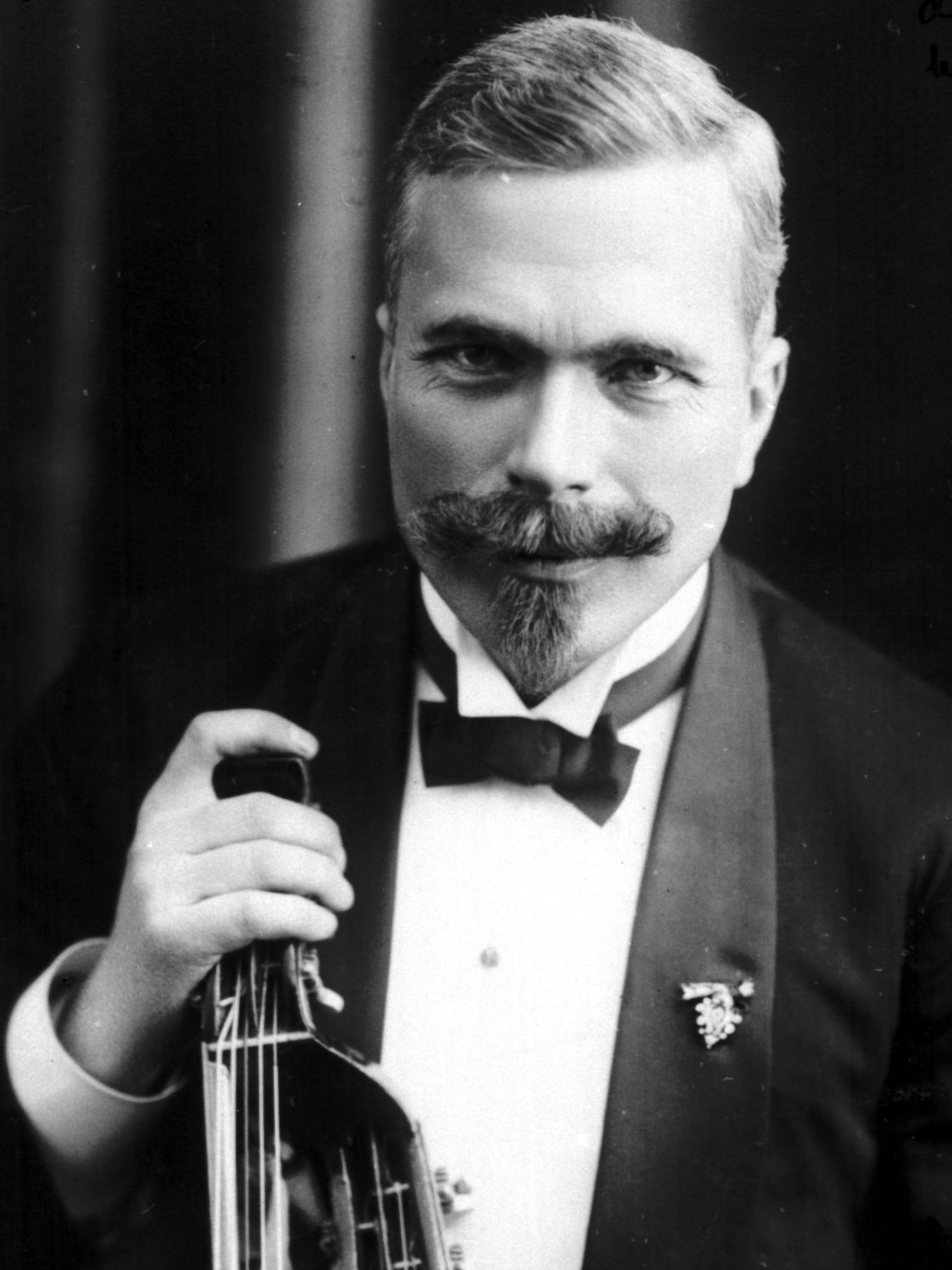
Sven Scholander was one of the first composers to set poems from Svarta ballader to music, in 1924.

From "Gillet på vinden" (The guest in the attic)
Dan Andersson

Det var utanför alla hjärtan och en stjärnbana framför allt vett,
det var vad intet öra hört och intet öga sett.

Prose translation

It was outside all our hearts and a star-trail above all knowledge,
it was what no ear heard and no eye saw.

Fogelqvist called this typical Andersson with its wonderful string music of the harmony of the spheres.

== Use as songs ==
Many of the poems have been set to music by 20th century composers and singer-songwriters, including by Andersson, Gunnar Turesson, Gunde Johansson, Thorstein Bergman, and Sven Scholander, becoming well known as songs in Sweden. Bergman's 1987 album Dan Andersson covered fifteen of Andersson's poems, including seven from Svarta ballader. The singer Sofia Karlsson's 2005 album was called Svarta ballader; it interpreted eleven Andersson poems, but despite the title only five were from the book.

== Bibliography ==
- Andersson, Dan (1917). Svarta ballader: dikter. Stockholm: Albert Bonniers Förlag. OCLC 62432831.
