= Omkring tiggarn från Luossa =

Swedish poem by Dan Andersson

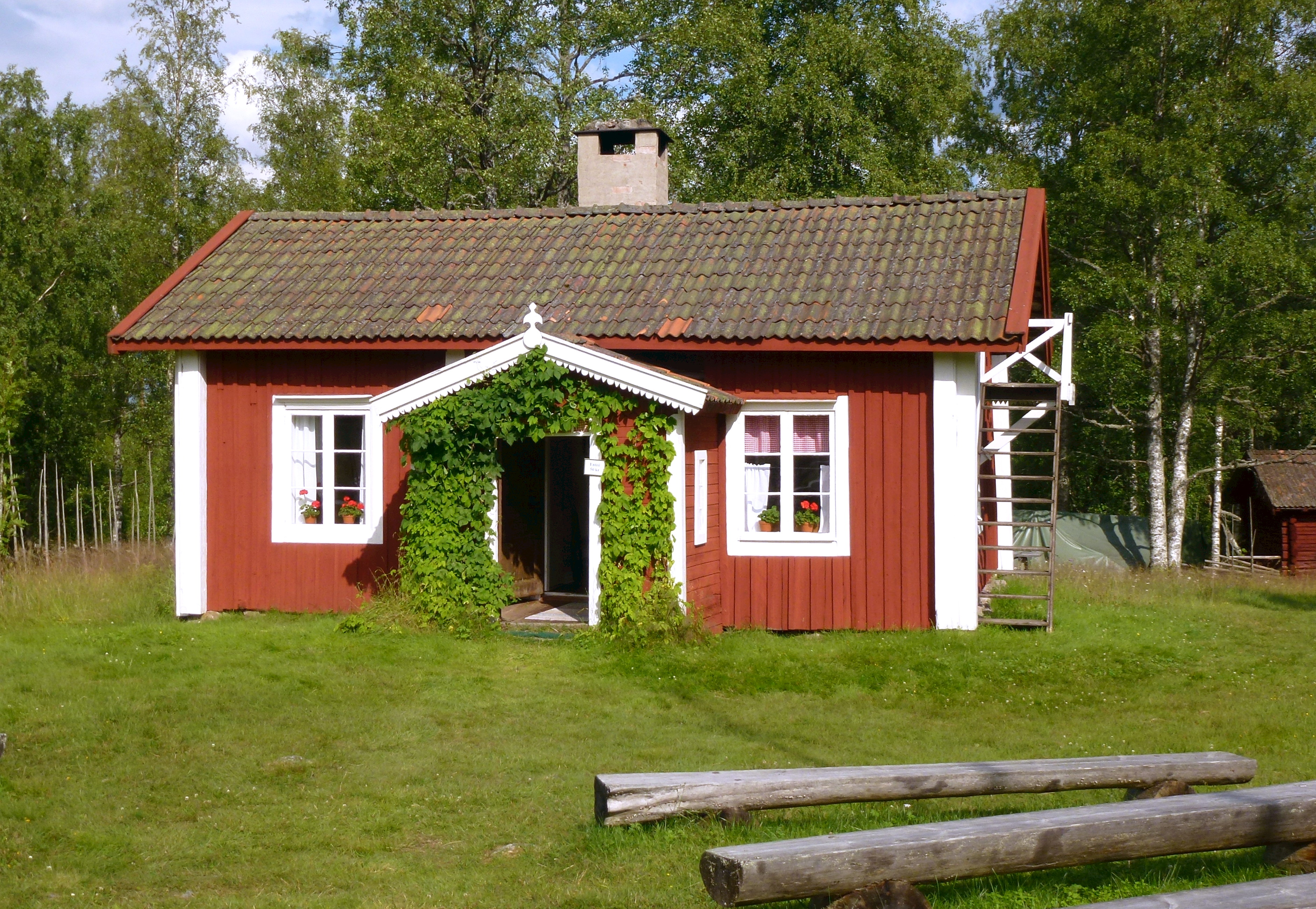
From 1912, Dan Andersson lived in the cottage named "Luossa", near Skattlösberg in Sweden's rural Dalarna region; it is named in the song.

Omkring tiggarn från Luossa (Around the beggar from Luossa) is a poem by the Swedish proletarian author Dan Andersson. Its nine four-line verses, with a ABAB rhyming scheme, create a picture of longing for something beyond the visible world. The poem was published in his 1917 poetry collection Svarta ballader (Black Ballads). It has become well-known through popular recordings by musicians including the Hootenanny Singers, Thorstein Bergman, and Sofia Karlsson.

== Context ==
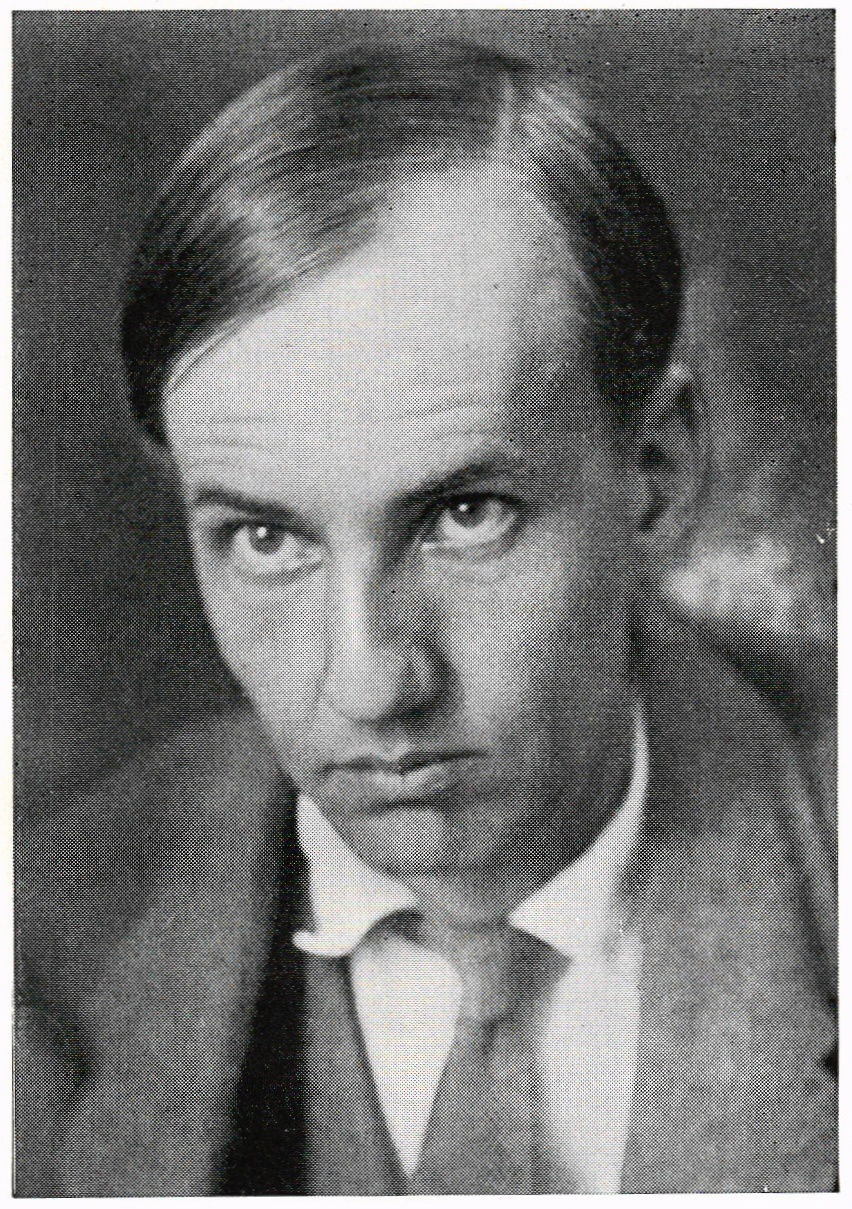
The Swedish poet Dan Andersson wrote the poem in 1917.

Dan Andersson (1888–1920) was a proletarian author, poet, and composer from Grangärde in the rural Dalarna region of Sweden. He was brought up in poverty, the son of a teacher. As a young man, Andersson worked as a charcoal burner and then as a shoemaker. In 1912, the family moved to a cottage named Luossa near Skattlösberg. From 1914, he published several books of poems including the 1917 Svarta ballader (Black Ballads); he had such difficulty finding a publisher that he accepted Albert Bonniers Förlag's offer of 25 copies of the book as his sole payment. The book has become one of the most important in 20th century Swedish literature. He died of accidental cyanide poisoning in a hotel in Stockholm. Posthumously, he became one of the most popular Swedish poets.

== Poem ==
"Omkring tiggarn från Luossa" (Around the Beggar from Luossa) is a poem of nine verses, each of four lines, published in Svarta Ballader; the rhyming scheme is ABAB. The journalist and poet Göran Greider describes it as difficult to analyse, calling Andersson a romantic and his words more like "pictures and revelations" than straightforward descriptions. He compares the poem to the songs of Bob Dylan, stating that while the audience may not know the exact meaning of his 1965 song "Mr. Tambourine Man", they instinctively feel it is excellent work.

The author Gösta Ågren stated in his 1971 book Kärlek som i allting bor that the French poet Charles Baudelaire had been an important influence on "Omkring tiggarn från Luossa". Andersson had bought a copy of Baudelaire's 1857 Les Fleurs du mal in January 1917, and translated some of Baudelaire's poetry, including Moesta et Errabunda. His early death in 1920 prevented the completion of his translation project of Les fleurs du mal.

The author and Swedish Academy member Lotta Lotass has described "Omkring tiggarn från Luossa" as the key poem in the whole of Anderson's work. The poem has become well-known both as a text and through popular recordings by different musicians. Jimmy Ginsby, director of the Dan Andersson Society, calls the poem one of the most loved of Andersson's works, stating that it is open and free of traditional religion, though sings of "something beyond the mountains", something that everyone knows. English translations of several of Andersson's poems, including "Omkring tiggarn från Luossa", have been published by Åke Helgesson and Caroline Schleef, and by John Irons.

Stanzas 1, 2 and 9 of Omkring tiggarn från Luossa
Dan Andersson, 1917

Omkring tiggarn från Luossa satt allt folket i en ring
Och vid lägerelden hörde de hans sång
Och om bettlare och vägmän och om underbara ting
Och om sin längtan sjöng han hela natten lång

'Det är något bortom bergen, bortom blommorna och sången,
det är något bakom stjärnor, bakom heta hjärtat mitt.
Hören — något går och viskar, går och lockar mig och beder:
Kom till oss, ty denna jorden den är icke riket ditt!'
...
'Vid en snäckbesållad havsstrand står en port av rosor tunga,
där i vila multna vraken och de trötta män få ro.
Aldrig hörda höga sånger likt fiolers ekon sjunga
under valv där evigt unga barn av saligheten bo.'

Prose translation

Around the beggar from Luossa sat the people in a ring
And by the camp fire listened to his song
And of tramps and robbers and of wonderful old things
And of his longing sang he through the whole night long.

'There is something beyond the hills, beyond the flowers and the song,
there is something behind the stars, behind my blazing breast.
Listen! — something comes and whispers, comes and tempts me and beseeches:
Come to us, for this dull planet cannot be your lasting rest!'
...
'By a seashell-sprinkled shoreline stands a gate of heavy roses,
Where at rest the rotting wrecks lie and the tired men have peace.
Music ears have never heard, high tones like a viol's singing echoes
Under heav'nly vaults where ever young the blessed children dwell.'

First stanza in John Irons' verse

Round the beggar from Luossa people sat in one great ring,
and around the campfire listened to his song.
And of roaming tramps and roadmen on their travels he did sing
and of his endless longing also, all night long:

== Song ==
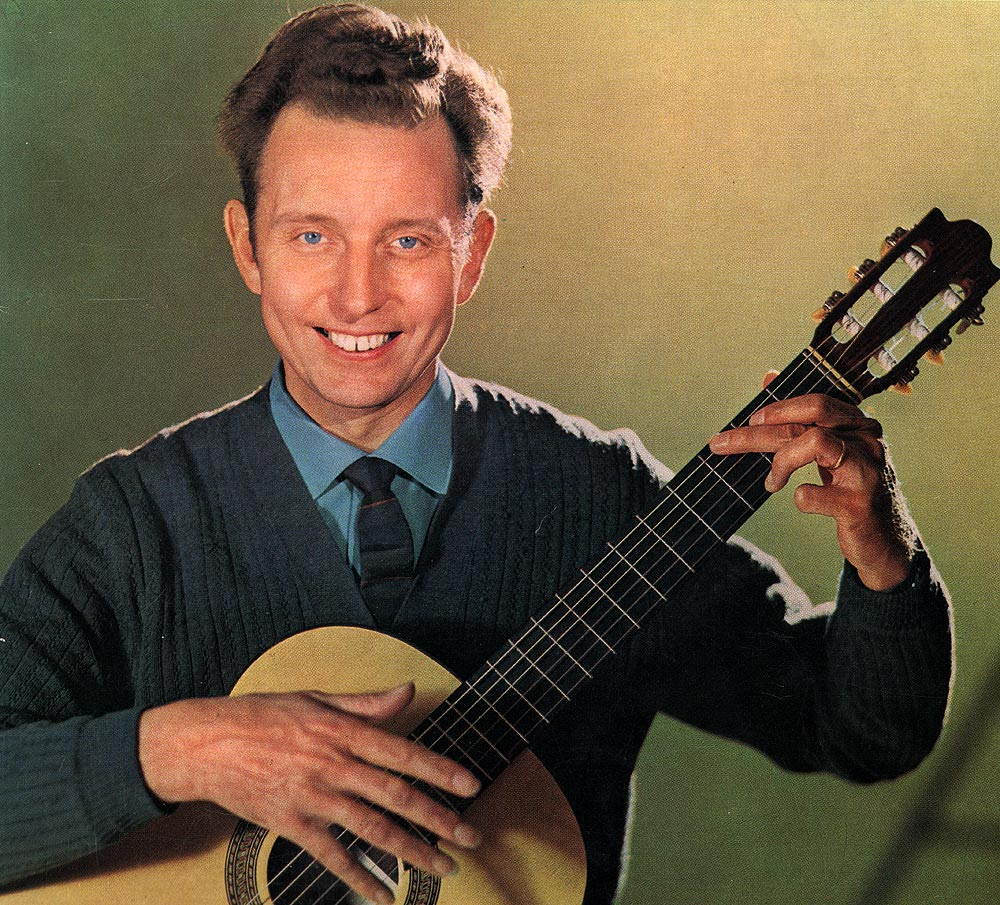
Gunde Johansson set the poem to music in 1954.

The singer Gunnar Turesson noted in his 1976 book Visor och skaldeminnen that Andersson had emphasised that "Omkring tiggarn från Luossa" should "be read and not sung". Despite this, the poem has repeatedly been set to music and recorded as a song. In 1938, the composer Josef Jonsson set it as a "melodrama for orchestra". The poem was set to music by the Swedish singer and musician Gunde Johansson in 1954, re-released on his 1963 album Dan Anderssons Dikter Och Visor. From November 1972, the version by the Hootenanny Singers reached second place in the Swedish Svensktoppen charts, and remained listed there for 52 weeks. The ABBA musician Björn Ulvaeus, who had been in the Hootenanny Singers, stated that the song had probably been their biggest hit, coming to his mind when his bandmate Hansi Schwartz died.

In 1979, the composer David Grufman published a new setting of the poem in his book of musical scores Äppelblom elva dikter. Thorstein Bergman performed it on his 1988 album Dan Andersson. In 2000, the poet and musician Ulf Lundell recorded the song on his album Evangeline.

Greider wrote that the song was so familiar in Sweden that towards the end of the 20th century, performances had become standard and traditional with little innovation. He noted that his father had requested the song for his funeral, and that it was among the most often sung of Swedish songs. In Greider's view, perception of the song changed when Sofia Karlsson performed it on her bestselling 2005 album Svarta ballader. He stated that Karlsson's "small but unbelievably nuanced and playful voice swept away much old dust from [Andersson's] songs", describing her version of "Omkring tiggarn från Luossa" as very rapid and gently genial. This won her the 2008 Dan Andersson prize.
