= Swedish lute =

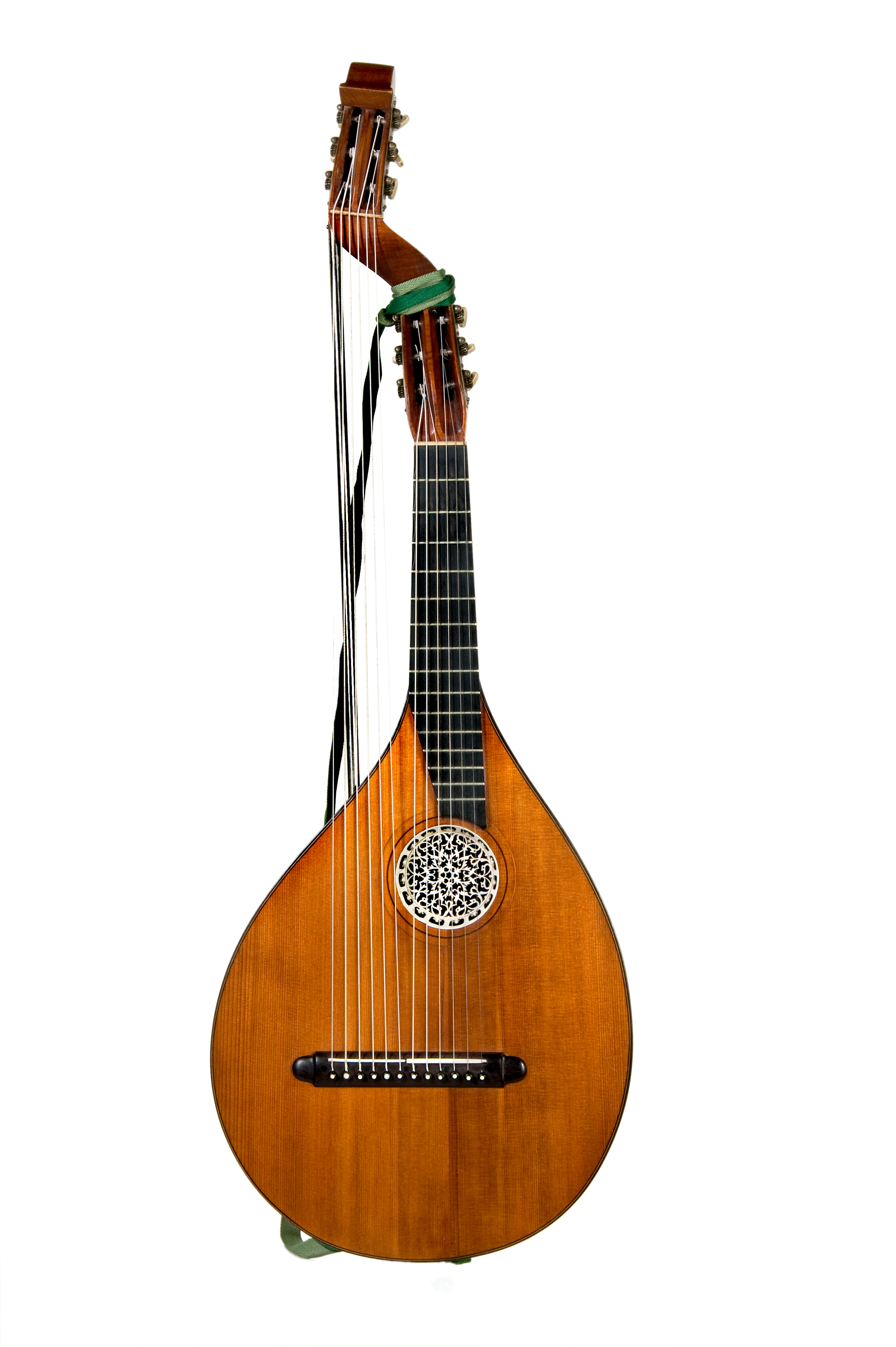
A Swedish lute

The Swedish lute (Swedish: svensk luta) is a musical instrument developed from the early cittern, with a theorbo'ed neck with several bass strings running offset from the fretboard. The modern Swedish lute generally has six strings over the fretboard, and four or more free-running strings.

== Overview ==
Prominent among early developers of the Swedish lute was Matthias Petter Kraft, who in the latter half of the 18th century built the lute played by the famous Swedish musician and composer Carl Michael Bellman.

Aside from Swedish musicians, the American folk musician Richard Dyer-Bennet also performed on the instrument, having studied in Sweden under Sven Scholander.
