= Dan Andersson =

Swedish author and poet

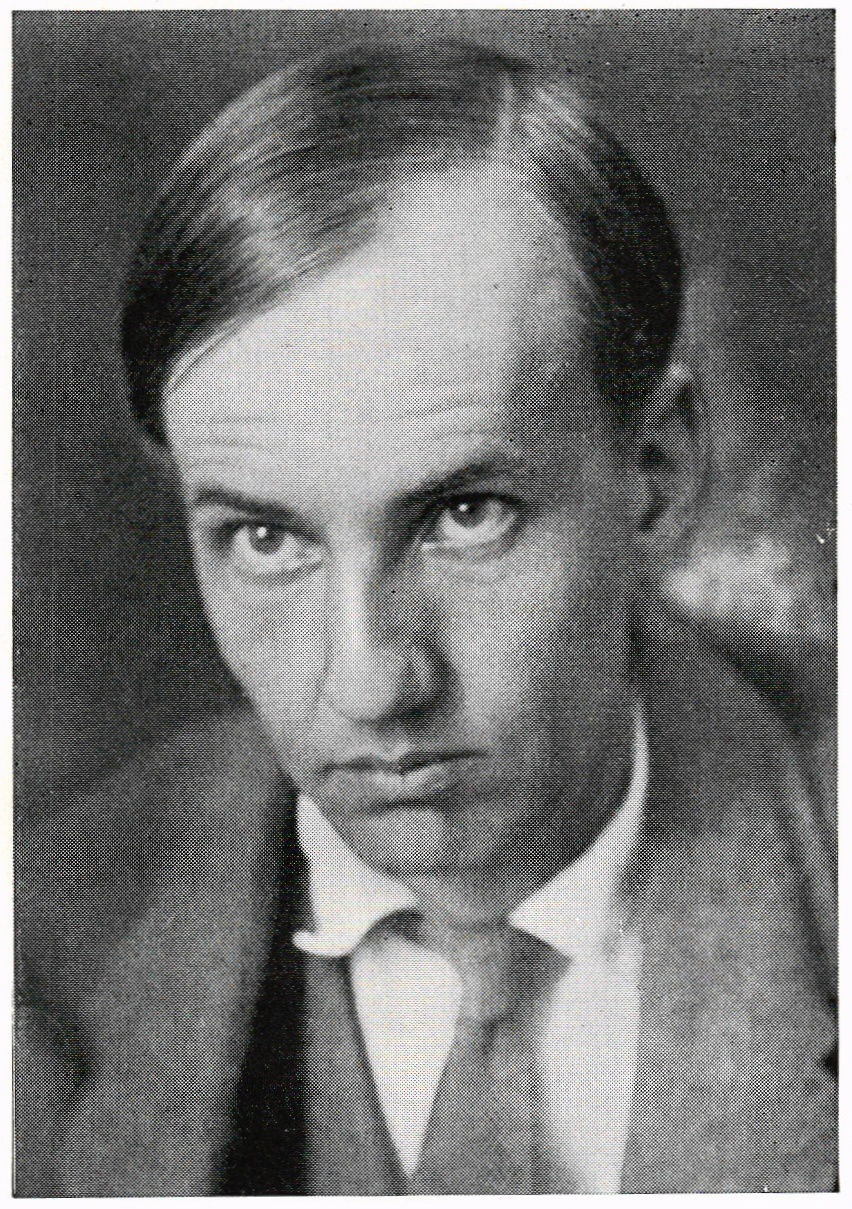
- Dan Andersson, 1917
- Born: Daniel Andersson; 6 April 1888; Ludvika, Sweden
- Died: 16 September 1920 (aged 32); Stockholm, Sweden
- Occupations: Author, poet
- Writing career
- Genres: proletarian and others
- Literary movement: Naturalism

Daniel Andersson (6 April 1888 – 16 September 1920) was a Swedish author, poet, and composer. He sometimes used the pen name Black Jim. Although he is counted among the Swedish proletarian authors, his works are not limited to that genre. His poems are among the most popular in Swedish literature; they have been set to music by more composers than any other 20th century Swedish poet.

== Early life ==
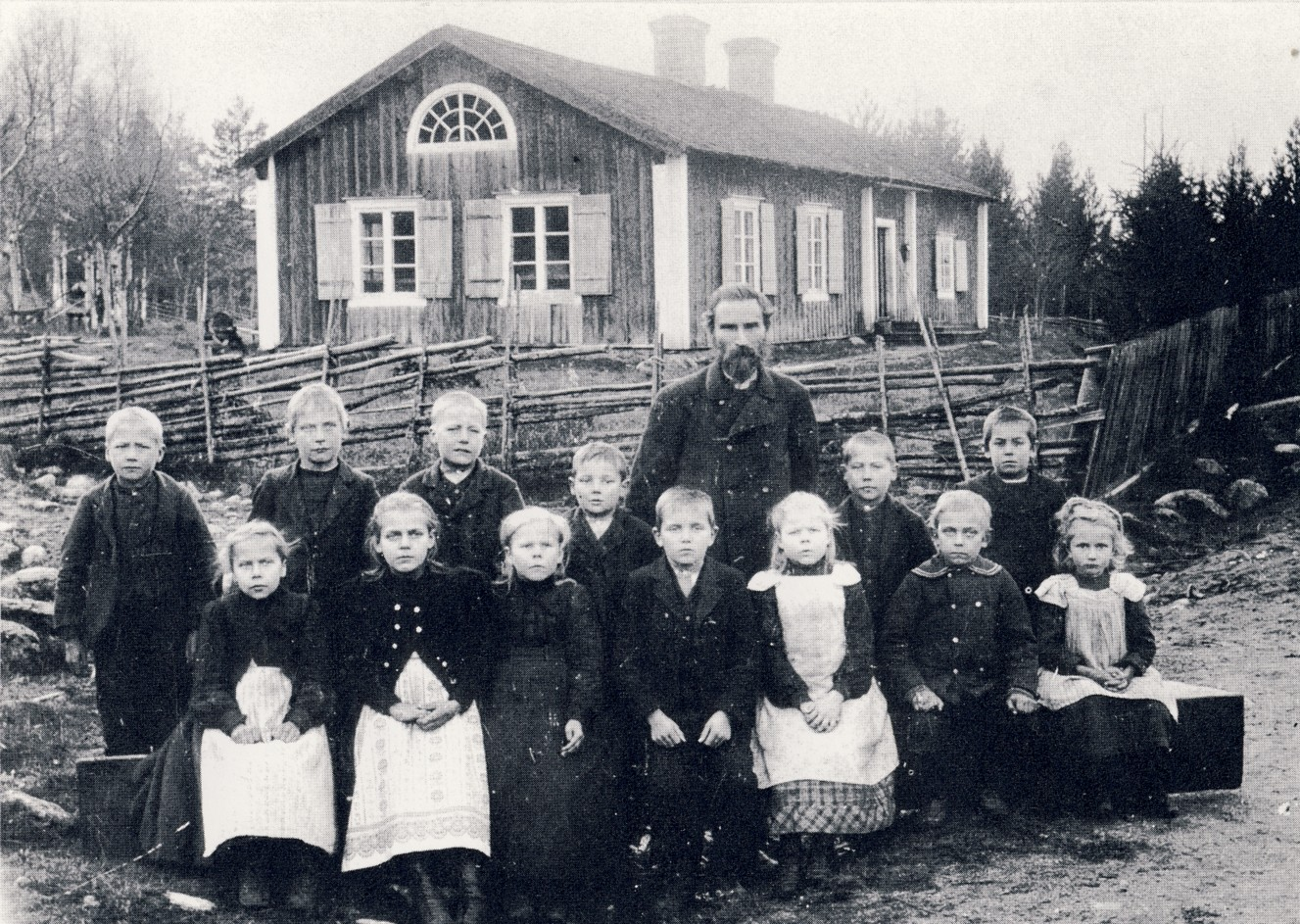
Dan Andersson's father Adolf was a teacher at Skattlösberg primary school. He is seen here with his class in front of the school in 1904.

Born in Grangärde parish in the province of Dalecarlia (Dalarna), Andersson grew up under harsh conditions in the village of Skattlösberg. His father Adolf was a primary school teacher there, and his mother Augusta had also taught in the local school. The village lies in the "Finn Woods" of southern Dalarna, where Forest Finns had immigrated to cultivate new land. On his father's side, Andersson descended from these Finnish settlers.

Andersson took odd jobs during the first years of his life, for instance as a forestry worker and school teacher. He found it difficult to make a living. The family considered trying to find a better life in the United States, and Andersson was sent to live in Forest Lake, Minnesota, as a 14-year-old in 1902 to see if it would be possible. But he wrote to them, saying that there were no better opportunities there than in Sweden, upon which his father asked him to come home. The family moved from Skattlösberg in 1905, but Andersson returned there to live with his parents and his five siblings in Luossa cottage there from 1911 to 1915. During this period, he wrote several stories and poems; in particular, large parts of his Kolarhistorier (Colliers' Stories) and Kolvaktarens visor (The charcoal-burner's Songs) were probably created during this time. Those collections mention his work of charcoal-burning; he describes looking after the charcoal "by the dim glow of a sooty lantern, swinging from the smoke-grimy roof of his sod-cabin." In 1918 Andersson married primary schoolteacher Olga Turesson, the sister of troubadour Gunnar Turesson.

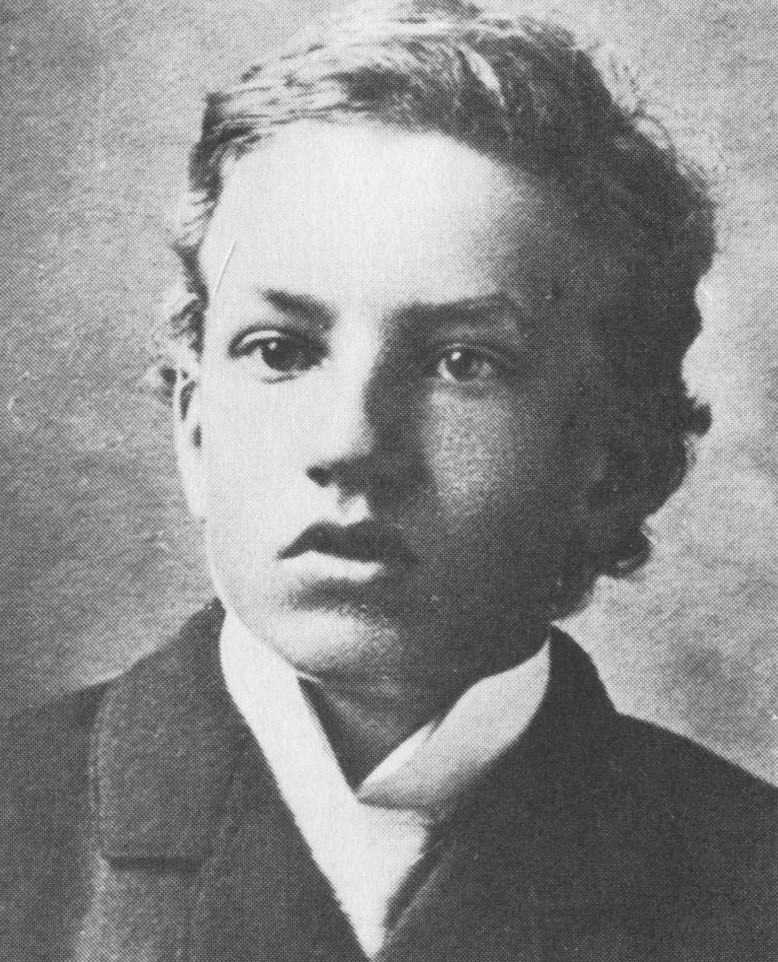
Andersson aged 14

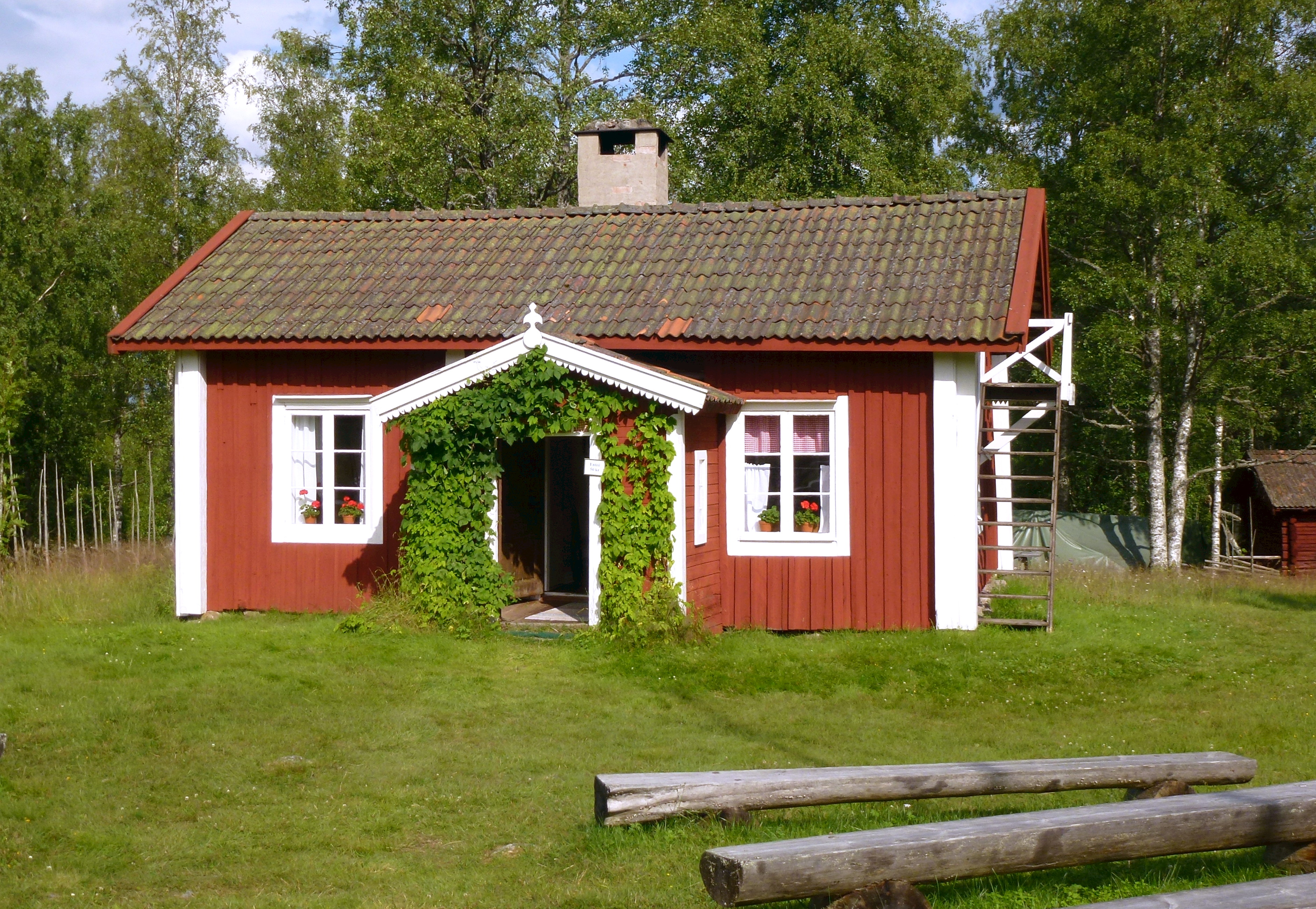
Luossa cottage, celebrated in the song "Omkring tiggarn från Luossa" (Around the beggar from Luossa), published in the 1917 Svarta ballader.

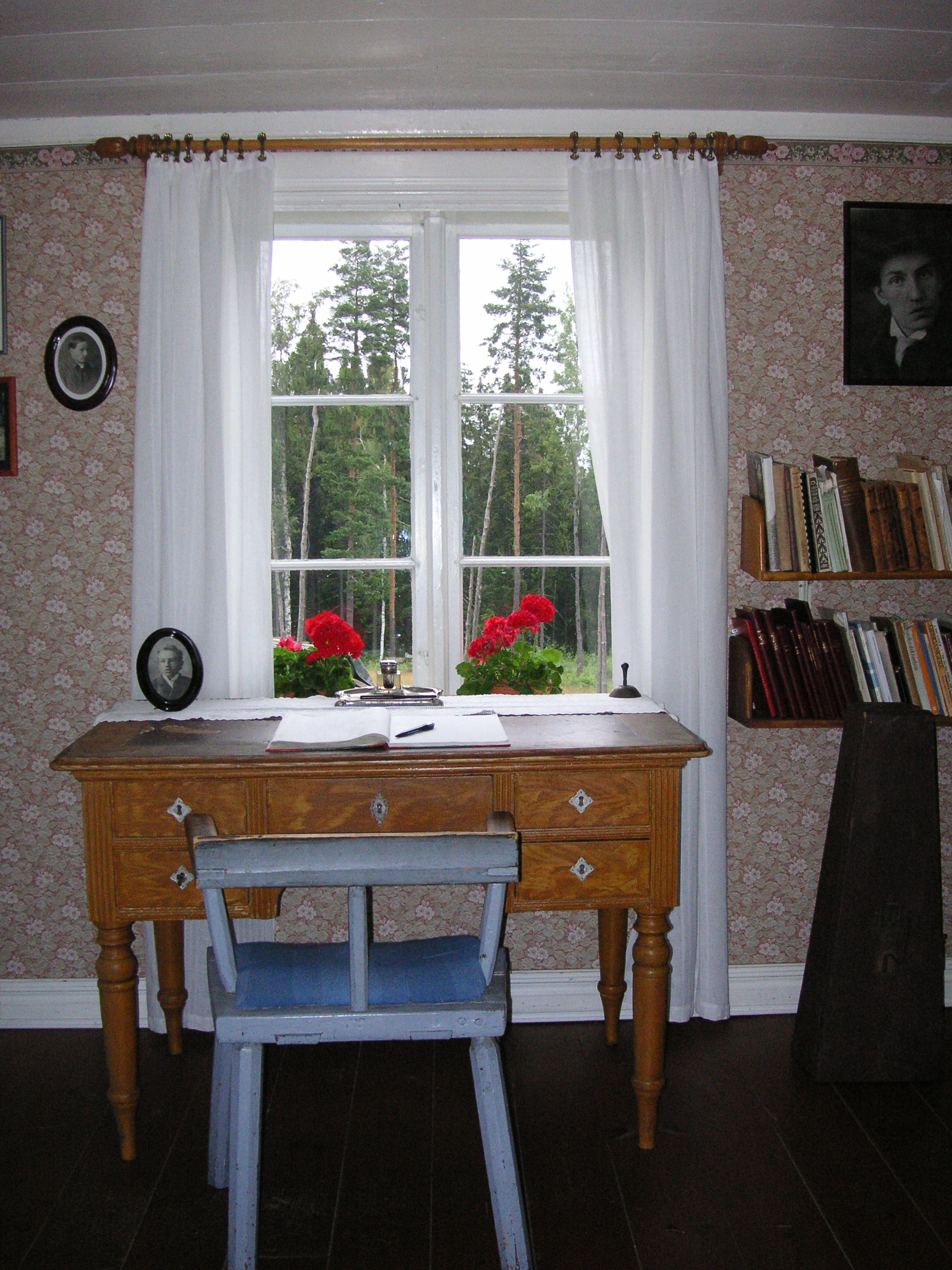
Andersson's writing-desk in Luossa cottage

== Brunnsvik ==
During 1914–1915, Andersson studied at the Brunnsvik folk high school, with, among others, future authors Harry Blomberg and Ragnar Jändel. He was a friend of Karl Lärka, who became a well-known documentary photographer. From this time onwards he was active as an author, writing poems and songs about his home region; these are still read and sung a century later in Swedish homes. Gunde Johansson and Thorstein Bergman are among the best known of his interpreters. Andersson set some of his own lyrics to music — most notably Till min syster ("To My Sister") and Jungman Jansson ("Seaman Jansson") — and played the accordion and violin. He was a co-worker at the Social Democratic newspaper Ny Tid in Gothenburg 1917–1918, and he also translated texts by Rudyard Kipling and Charles Baudelaire into Swedish. Despite his simple upbringing, Andersson was highly educated.

== Death ==
On 16 September 1920, Dan Andersson died in room 11 at Hotel Hellman in Stockholm, where he had gone to look for a job at the newspaper Social-Demokraten. The hotel staff had used hydrogen cyanide against bedbugs and had not cleared the room as prescribed. At 3 p.m. Andersson was found dead. Andersson is buried at Lyviken Cemetery in Ludvika.

== Legacy ==
The historian of literature Ingemar Algulin writes that Andersson's ballads "were splendidly rhythmic and mellow and permeated by sentimental strains"; they include some of the most popular of all Swedish poems, such as "Helgdagskväll i timmerkojan", "En spelmans jordafärd", and "Jungman Jansson". The translator Roger Hinchliffe comments that Andersson "could never have dreamed how beloved his verses would become, nor that they would attract more composers than any other 20th century Swedish poet." He characterises Andersson's verse as containing a quantity of "Oriental mysticism", alongside love of the forested region and its simple people, "lumberjacks, charcoal makers and fiddlers", with their hard poor ways of life, their "storytelling and music". In 2005, Sofia Karlsson recorded a new interpretation of 11 of his songs on her album Svarta ballader, which won a Grammis award in Sweden, a Manifest Prize, and Denmark's Folk Prize.

In 1988, at the centenary of Andersson's birth, Posten, the Swedish postal service, published two stamps in his honour. In Ludvika, a Dan Andersson week is celebrated the first week of every August; the town has a Dan Andersson museum and statue. There is a bust at Järntorget in Gothenburg.

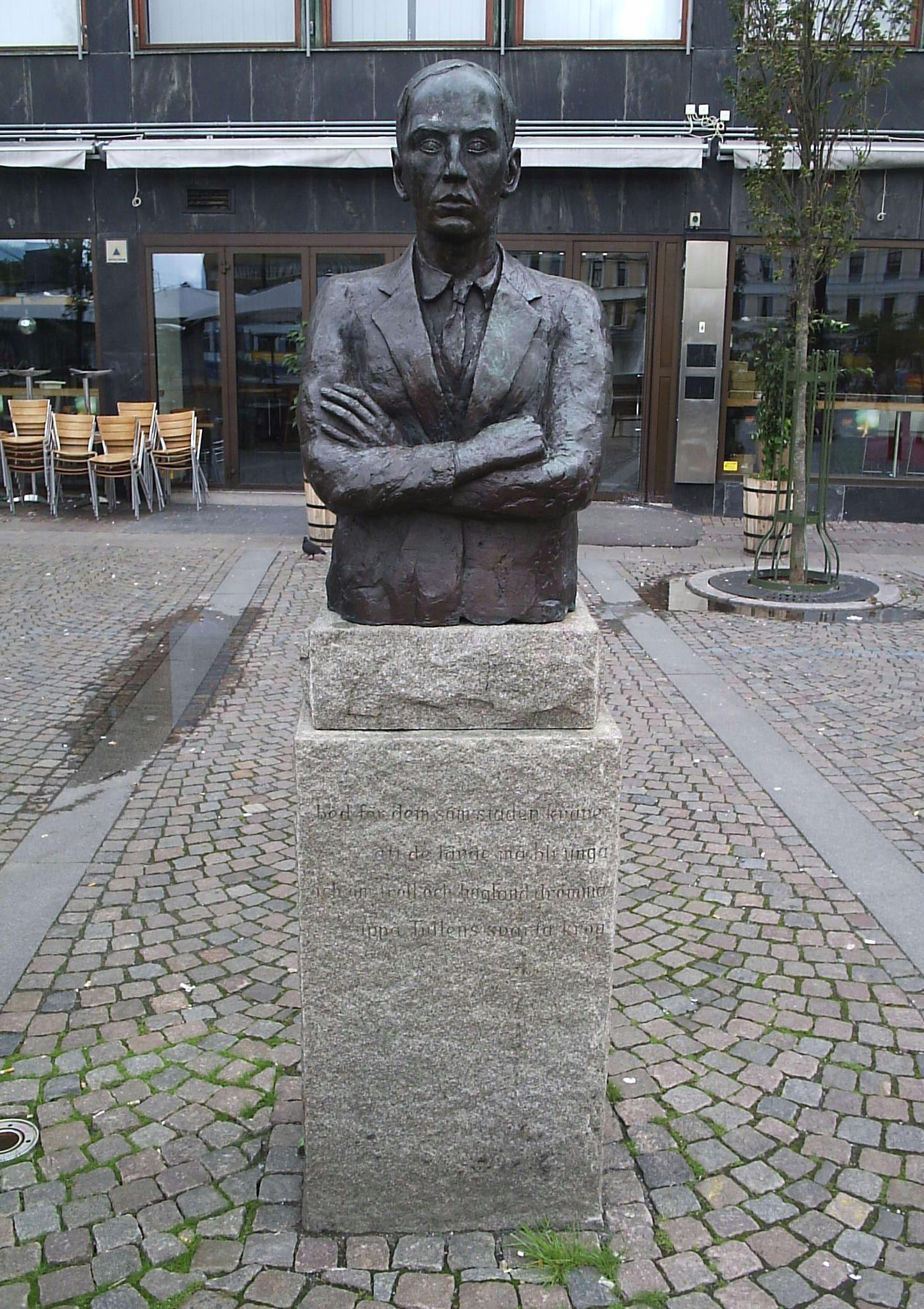
Andersson bust, Gothenburg

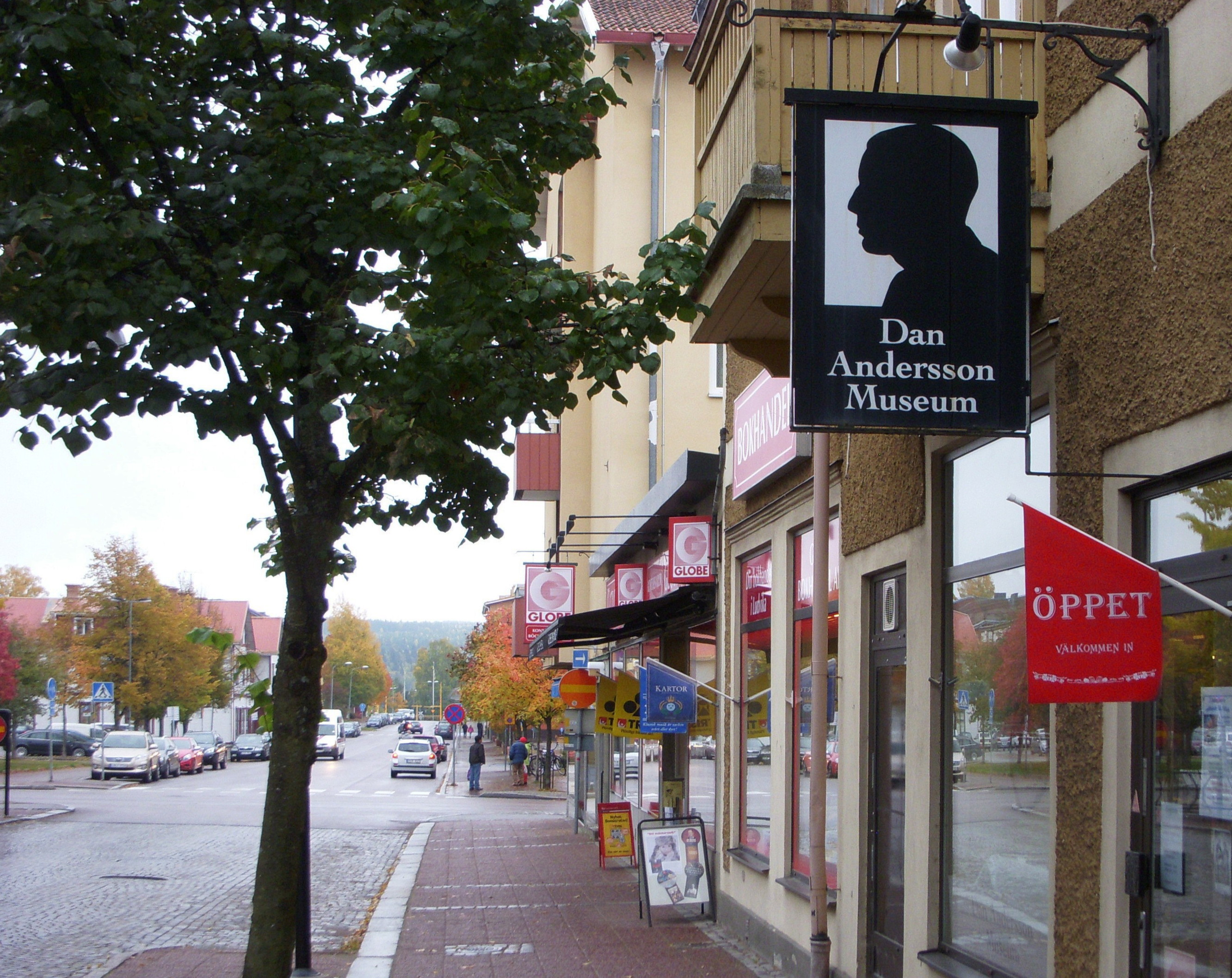
The Dan Andersson museum, Ludvika

== Works ==
=== In Swedish ===
- 1903 Brevkort från Grangärde finnmark (Postcard from Grangärde Finnmark)
- 1914 Kolarhistorier (Coal Stories)
- 1915 Kolvaktarens visor (The Charcoal-burner's Songs)
- 1916 Det kallas vidskepelse (That's called Superstition)
- 1917 Svarta ballader (Black Ballads)
- 1918 De tre hemlösa (The Three Homeless)
- 1919 David Ramms arv (David Ramm's Legacy)
- 1920 Chi-mo-ka-ma. Berättelser från norra Amerika (Chi-mo-ka-ma. Stories from North America)
- 1922 Efterlämnade dikter (Surviving Poems)

=== In English ===
- 1929 Modern Swedish Poetry Pt. 1, trans. by C. D. Locock, (New York: The Macmillan Company)
- 1934 Modern Swedish Short Stories, trans. by Madeleine Ekenberg, (London: Cape)
- 1943 Charcoal Burner’s Ballad and Other Poems by Dan Andersson, trans. by Caroline Schleef, (New York: Fine Editions Press)
- 1950 Scandinavian Songs and Ballads edited by Martin S. Allwood, (Mullsjö: Anglo-American Center)
- 1958 The Last Night in Paindalen by Dan Andersson, trans. by Caroline Schleef, (Galesburg: Wagoner Printing Co.)
- 1974 Swedish Songs LP, trans. by Fred Lane, (Stockholm: Troll Flute)
- 1991 Swedes On Love CD, trans. by Roger Hinchliffe, (Stockholm: Roger Records)
- 1994 Dan Andersson in English, trans. by Åke Helgesson, (Hallsberg: Åke Helgesson)
- 2003 Poems of Dan Andersson, trans. by Mike McArthur, (Wintringham: Oak Tree Press)

== Sources ==
- Algulin, Ingemar (1989). A History of Swedish Literature. Stockholm: Swedish Institute.
- Gustafson, Alrik (1961). A History of Swedish Literature. Minneapolis: University of Minnesota Press.
- Marklund, Lena (2014). "Dan Andersson". Project Runeberg.
- Warme, Lars G., ed. (1996). A History of Swedish Literature. Lincoln: University of Nebraska Press.
