= Söder om kärleken =

Studio album by Sofia Karlsson
- Released: 2009
- Genre: Folk
- Label: Playground Music Scandinavia

Sofia Karlsson chronology
Visor från vinden (2007)	Söder om kärleken (2009)	Norr om Eden (2010)

Söder om kärleken (South of love) is a 2009 album by the Swedish singer and songwriter Sofia Karlsson, her fourth studio album.

== Album ==
Söder om kärleken is Sofia Karlsson's fourth studio album. Magnus Eriksson, writing in the Swedish national daily newspaper Svenska Dagbladet, said that the melodies were soft, caressing, slightly lilting, like the lyrics, giving an immediate and close expression for her experience. Karlsson captured the nuances of love with supreme precision. If love was ambiguous, her lyrics were crystal clear and beautiful.

Christel Hofberg, interviewing Karlsson in the Swedish newspaper Göteborgs Posten, said that Karlsson had made a fresh start with the album, all of it being her own work except for two songs co-written. The lyrics were extremely personal: "South of Love" named a warm place where one could stand and look at love.

The FolkWorld music review website wrote that it respected Karlsson for daring to record her own compositions after her two albums of covers. It liked the "solid guitar, nice violin" and other instruments, Blåsut being reminiscent of Alison Krauss in style and sound. The reviewer singled out Stjärnor över Asahikawa (Stars over Asahikawa) as a fragile, sensitive song where Karlsson was at her best. While the album was less adventurous than her earlier work, it was beautiful and would please listeners who liked Karlsson's style, fitting "perfectly in her repertoire".

Anders Dahlbom, writing on the Swedish news and culture website Nöje (part of the Swedish national tabloid Expressen) described the album as having less bite than her earlier albums, but still with a voice that always gets one to stand up and listen. Dahlbom called it Americana with a melancholy shimmer, folk music that vibrated with sensitivity and the joy of performing.

The album won a gold disk in 2011.

== Track listing ==
All the songs are by Sofia Karlsson.

1. Du var där (You Were There) 2:57
2. Skärmarbrink (Skärmarbrink) 2:29
3. Smält mig till glöd (Melt Me to Embers) 3:30
4. Andra sidan (The Other Side) 2:53
5. Dadgad (Dadgad) 2:41
6. Dina händer (Göteborg) (Your Hands (Gothenburg)) 4:34
7. Stjärnor över Asahikawa (Stars over Asahikawa) 5:59
8. Visa från Kåkbrinken (Song from Kåkbrinken) 2:35
9. Blåsut (Blåsut) 2:47
10. Regn över Årsta (Rain over Årsta) 3:11
11. Andra sidan (Repris) (The Other Side (Reprise)) 0:43
12. Imma på fönstret (Mist on the Window) 3:02
13. Alltid dig nära (Always Near You) 3:28
14. Näktergalen (bonus track) (The Nightingale) 3:07

== Performers ==
- Sofia Karlsson – vocals, Irish transverse flute, Wurlitzer, guitar, whistle, bouzouki, guitar, glockenspiel, Hammond B3, tenor guitar, transverse flute
- Gustaf Ljunggren – guitar, pedal steel, vocals, resonator guitar, lap steel, melody banjo, mandola, mando guitar, bass clarinet, clarinet, flute, tenor guitar
- Henry Cederblom – electric guitar, dobro, guitar
- Sofie Livebrant – vocals
- Roger Tallroth – 12-string guitar, tenor guitar, cittern
- Stuart Duncan – violin, mandolin
- Mike Marshall – mandolin
- Staffan Lindfors – bass, vocals
- Olle Linder – bass, drums
- Per Ekdahl – shaker
- Fredrik Gille – percussion
- Per Svenner – floor tom
- Gideon Andersson – guitar
- Bent Clausen – vibraphone

== Charts ==
=== Weekly charts ===
Chart (2009)	Peak position
Swedish Albums (Sverigetopplistan)	4

=== Year-end charts ===
Chart (2009)	Position
Swedish Albums (Sverigetopplistan)	35
