= Sofia Karlsson (singer) =

Swedish singer (born 1975)

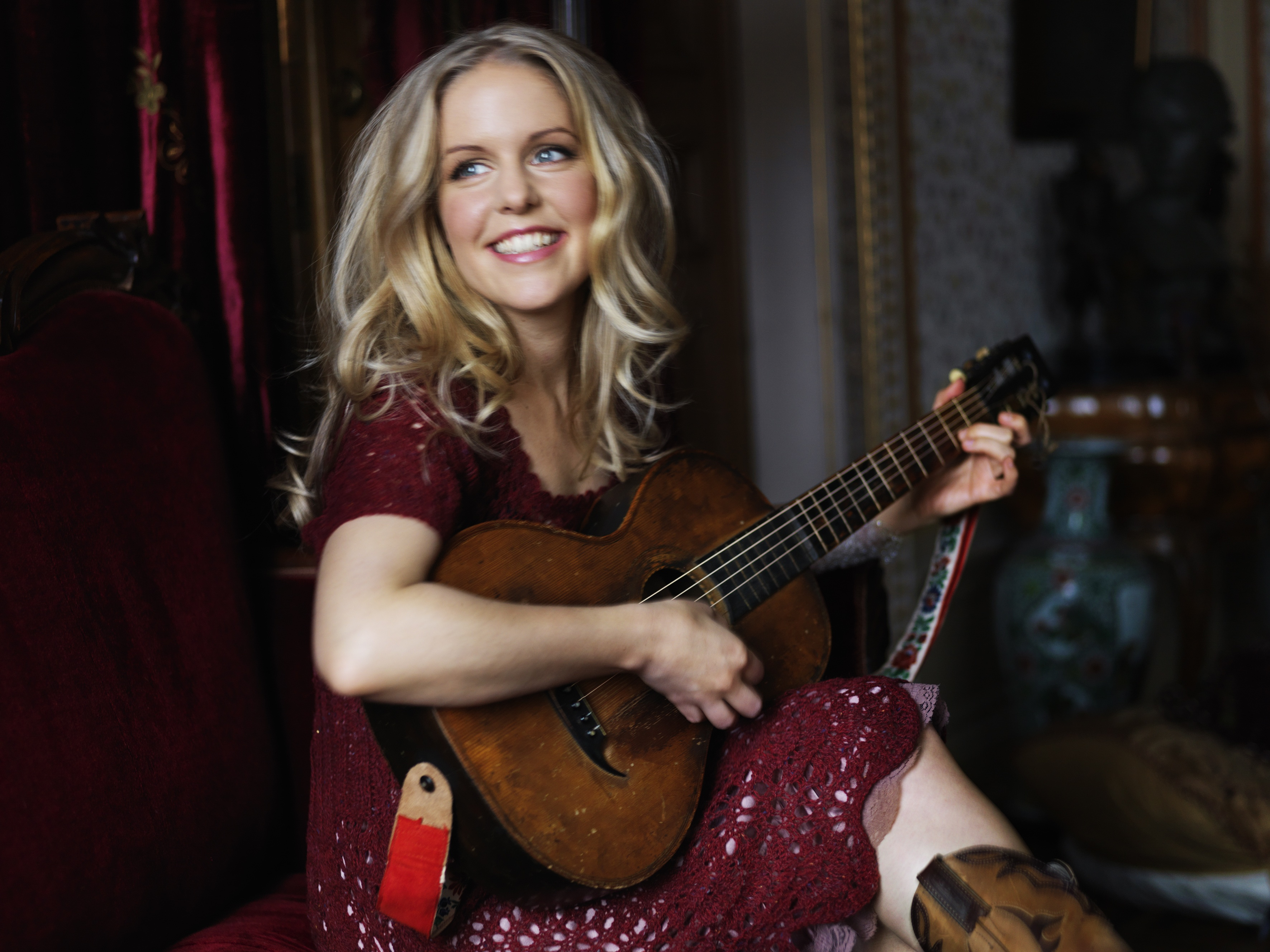
- In 2008

Background information
- Born: 25 March 1975 (age 51); Enskede, Sweden
- Occupation: Singer
- Instruments: Bouzouki; Guitar; Flute; Pump organ, Violin
- Years active: c. 1998–present

Johanna Sofia Blåsippa Karlsson (born 25 March 1975 in Enskede, Sweden) is a classically-trained Swedish folk singer and songwriter. Her breakthrough album was of poems from a book by the Swedish proletarian poet Dan Andersson, Svarta ballader. She is known for her interpretations of poems and songs by authors as varied as Baudelaire, Mikael Wiehe, Inger Hagerup, Carl Michael Bellman, Peps Persson, Evert Taube, and Boris Vian. She has won both Swedish and Danish Grammys.

== Biography ==
Sofia Karlsson grew up in Enskede, Stockholm. She attended the folk music department of the Royal College of Music in Stockholm. From 1998 to 2002 she was a full-time member in Swedish folk music act Groupa. In 2002 she released her debut solo album Folk songs.

In 2005 she made her public breakthrough with her second album Svarta ballader (Black Ballads). The album contains her interpretations of the Swedish poet Dan Andersson, named for his 1917 book. The album was in the charts for more than a year and has to date sold 60,000 copies. It was rewarded with Swedish as well as Danish Grammys.

After touring the country for two years she released her third album Visor från vinden (Songs from the loft) with its collection of classical songs sung in Swedish, but written by poets and musicians such as Baudelaire, Dan Andersson, Marianne Flodin, Mikael Wiehe, Alf Hambe, Inger Hagerup, Carl Michael Bellman, Peps Persson, and Evert Taube. The album also contains Lars Forssell's free version of Boris Vian's "Le Déserteur".

== Reception ==
Folk Songs

Peggy Latkovich, writing on Rootsworld, describes Karlsson as "an artist who deals in nuance and delicate shadings", adding that her voice "has the smoky overlay of Sandy Denny and the expressive phrasing of Niamh Parsons". Rootsworld describes Folk Songs as understated, with "exquisitely subtle performance". Rather than being traditional Swedish folk music, Karlsson and her band produce "meticulously wrought, emotionally satisfying works of art".

Svarta ballader

Göran Holmquist wrote in Helsingborgs Dagblad that "With its fingertip-light arrangement, she manages to bring Dan Andersson's poetry about dreams, breakup and longing into the present."

The review site Dagensskiva.com gave the album 10/10, writing that "Sofia Karlsson has built a bridge to my childhood experience of Dan Andersson. The romantic, primaeval forest's loneliness and longing for closeness."

The review site Rootsy.nu ended its review with the words "Svarta ballader is hereby designated as 2005's best Swedish ballad and folk music album."

== Awards ==
Karlsson has won the Swedish equivalent of the Grammy, the Grammis, four times, in 2005, 2007, 2009, and 2011, for her albums Folk Songs, Svarta Ballader, Söder om kärleken, and Levande.

In 2006, Karlsson won the "folk/world music" prize at the Swedish Manifest Gala, where the jury said that "With an alloy of Swedish song tradition, folk music precision and playful genre-borrowing, Sofia Karlsson's album has made Dan Andersson indispensable for another generation." In 2008, she won the Dan Andersson prize; In 2009, Prince Eugen's Culture Prize; in 2010, the Ulla Billquist Stipend; in 2013, the Troubadour Prize; and in 2015, Stockholm City's Culture Prize.

== Discography ==
Albums

- Folk songs, 2002
- Svarta ballader (Black ballads), 2005
- Visor från vinden (Songs from the loft), 2007
- Söder om kärleken (South of love), 2009
- Norr om Eden (EP) (North of Eden), 2010
- Levande (live recordings) (Living), 2011
- Regnet faller utan oss (Rain falls without us), 2014
- Stjärnenätter (Starry Nights, with Martin Hederos), 2015
- Guitar Stories (with Mattias Pérez and Daniel Ek), 2019
- Sånger från broccolifälten (Songs from the broccoli fields), 2022

Contributions

- Jul i folkton (Christmas in folk style), 2005
- Folkjul (A Swedish Folk Christmas), 2007
- Dreamers' Circus (EP) (with Dreamers' Circus), 2010
