= Grangärde =

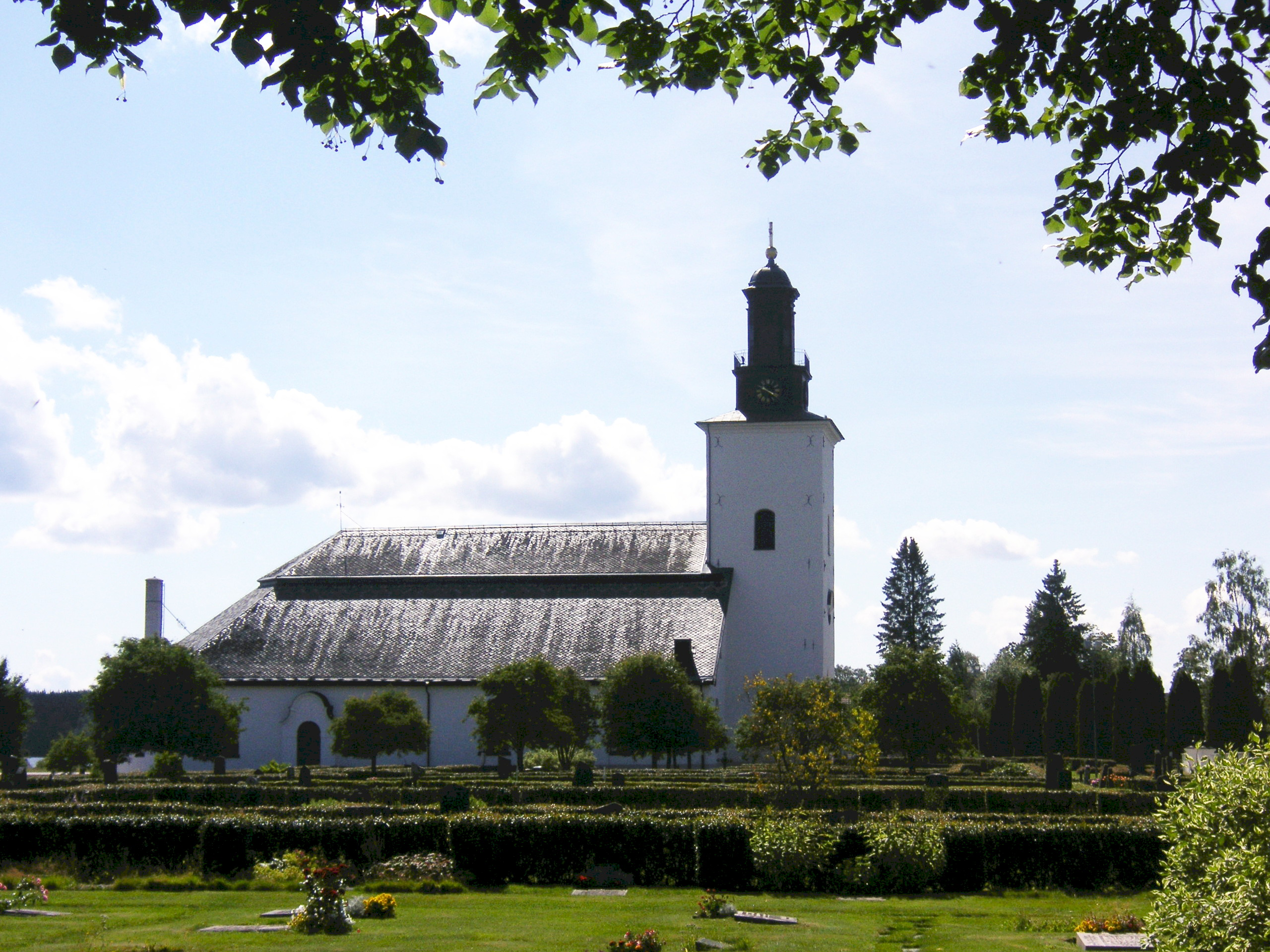
- Grangärde church

- Location within Dalarna Location within Sweden
- Coordinates: 60°16′N 14°59′E
- Country: Sweden
- Province: Dalarna
- County: Dalarna County
- Municipality: Ludvika Municipality

Area
  - Total: 0.68 km^{2} (0.26 sq mi)

Population (31 December 2010)
  - Total: 351
  - Density: 519/km^{2} (1,340/sq mi)
- Time zone: UTC+1 (CET)
  - Summer (DST): UTC+2 (CEST)

Grangärde is a locality situated in Ludvika Municipality, Dalarna County, Sweden, with 351 inhabitants in 2010.

Grangärde Court District, or Grangärde tingslag, was a district of Dalarna in Sweden. The court district (tingslag) served as the basic division of the rural areas in Dalarna, except for one district that was a hundred (härad). The entire province had once been a single hundred, called Dala hundare.

Heavy metal musician, Peter Tägtgren, was born in Grangärde.
