= Scandinavian ballad tradition =

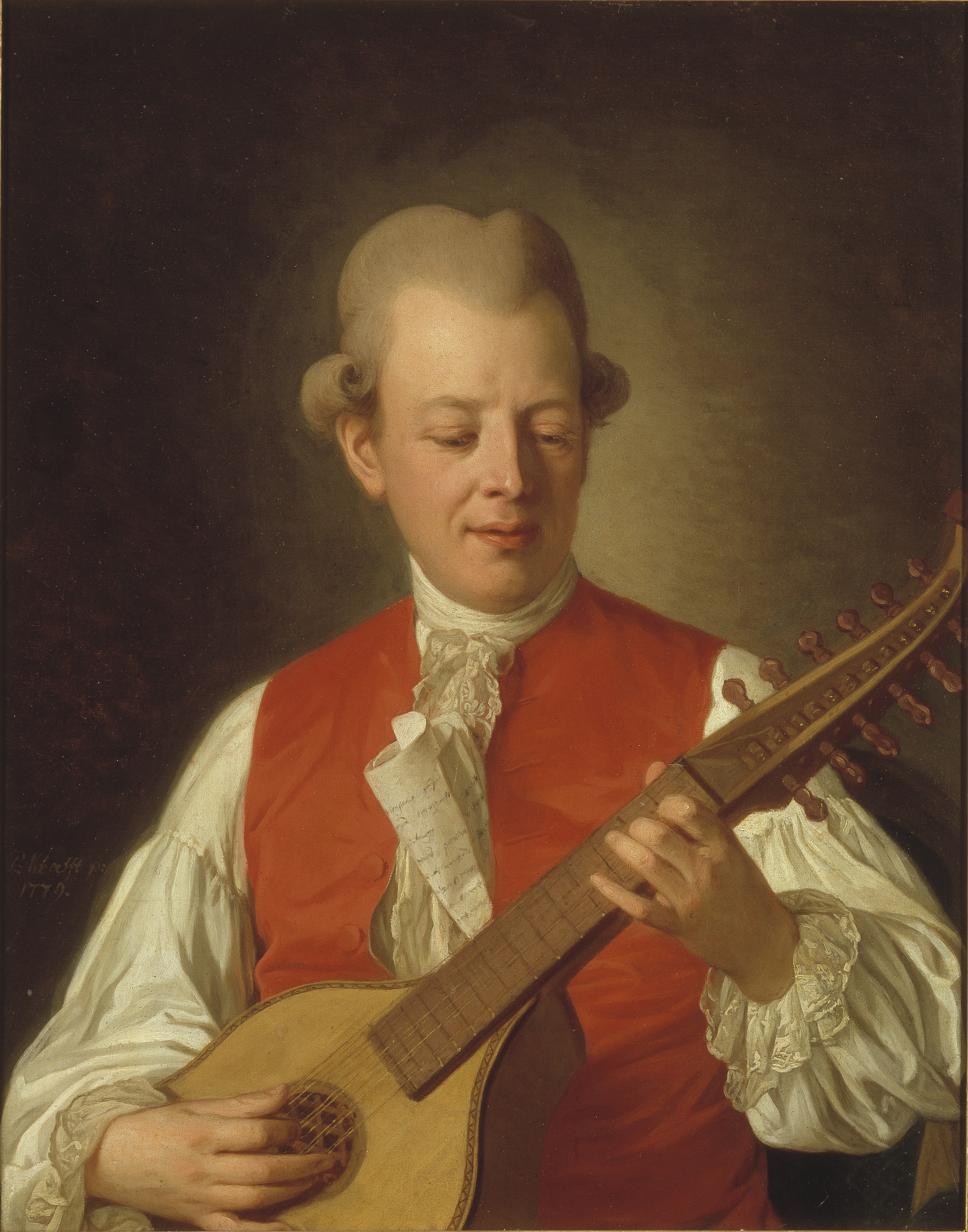
Carl Michael Bellman

The Scandinavian ballad tradition is the tradition of Scandinavian poetic singer-songwriters. Within the tradition, the Swedish ballad tradition has been particularly influential, but the tradition also exists in the other Scandinavian countries. This visa tradition should not be confused with traditional "medieval" Swedish ballads (medeltida ballader), which are representative of a typical tradition of Scandinavian ballads.

== Tradition ==
The Scandinavian ballad tradition today is both a respected art form and an important basis of the popular Scandinavian sing-along tradition. The song type is typically known as visa in Swedish or vise in Norwegian, and troubadours in the genre are called vissångare in Swedish or visesanger in Norwegian. In context, the Swedish word "ballad" is a subtype of "visa" that tells a story in many verses, similar to the medieval ballads, as opposed to for instance lyrical songs about the beauty of nature. The Swedish ballads can be performed to a big orchestra but are often sung to fairly simple accompaniment on guitar, or other instruments such as piano or accordion.

=== Sweden ===
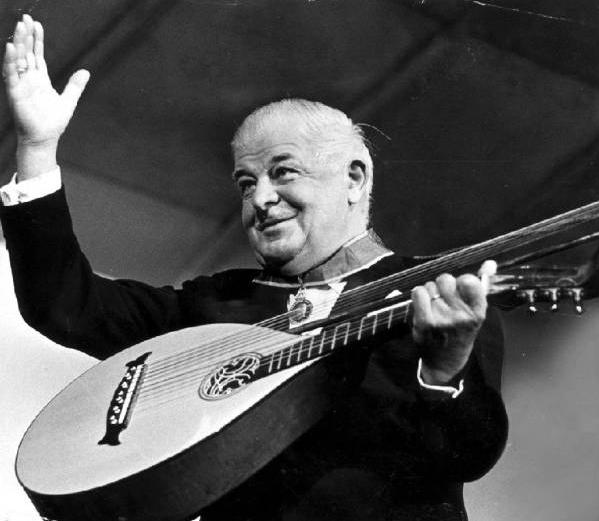
Evert Taube

The genre started with Carl Michael Bellman in the late 18th century. In the 19th century, poetic songwriting fell into decline in favour of academic student choirs, until it was revived in the 1890s by Sven Scholander. Poets increasingly continued the tradition of having their poetry put to music to give it a wider audience. In the early 1900s, a lot of poetry of the 90s poets Gustaf Fröding and Erik Axel Karlfeldt had been put to music, and the popularity of those poets largely depended on the troubadours.

Birger Sjöberg (1885–1929) was one of the early popular troubadours. Sjöberg published the poetry collection Frida's Book (Fridas bok, 1922), a light and humorous story of the young Frida. In 1926, he reinvented himself with Kriser och kransar (Crises and garlands), a much darker collection of poetry. It is regarded as the foremost collection of Swedish poetry of the 1920s.

One of the most renowned Swedish troubadours of the 20th century was Evert Taube (1890–1976). He established himself as a performing artist in 1920 and toured Sweden for about three decades. He is best known for songs about sailors, ballads about Argentina, and songs about the Swedish countryside.

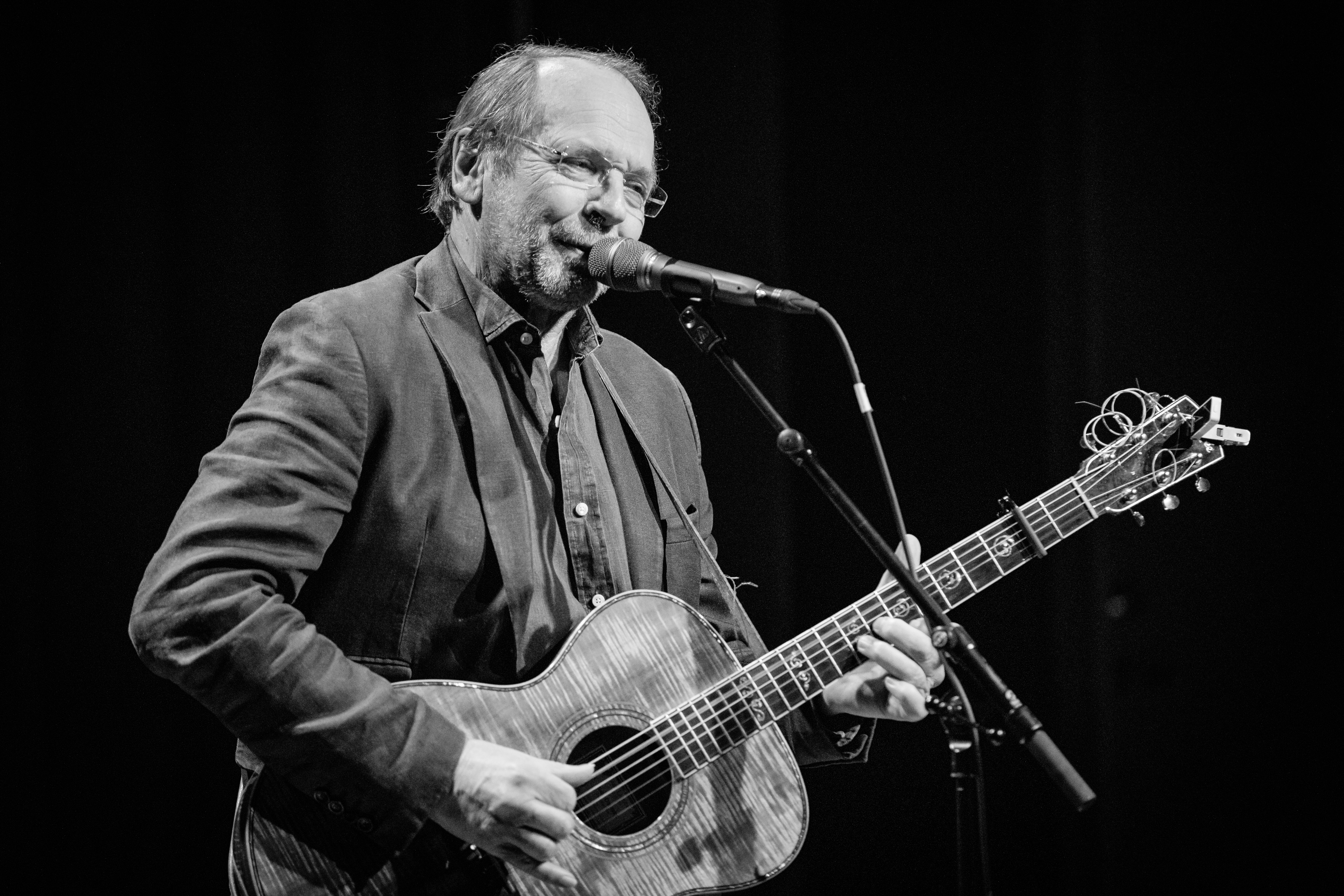
Ole Paus

A poet who is known for songs is Nils Ferlin (1898–1961) who published six collection of poetry between 1930 and 1957. Ferlin melancholic but with a stinging irony, and very rhythmical which made them easy for friends and colleagues to put music to. The titles of some of the poems already from the start referred to them being sung as songs, such as "En valsmelodi" (which translates as "A waltz tune"), and the title of his first collection of poems, "En döddansares visor".

Other well-known singer-songwriters in the Swedish ballad tradition after Evert Taube were Olle Adolphson (1934–2004) and Cornelis Vreeswijk (1937–1987). Vreeswijk's songs were initially leftist protest songs where he took upon himself to speak for the weaker men of society. After his death, Vreeswijk also gained appreciation for his poetic qualities.

A Swedish contemporary troubadour is Lars Winnerbäck, whose folk-rock ballads, often infused with a poetic quality, mix a Christian socialist political message with a typically Swedish sensitivity to nature in the spirit of Vreeswijk, making him one of Sweden's most popular currently active musicians.

=== Norway ===
The contemporary Norwegian ballad tradition, known as the "ballad wave" (Norwegian: visebølgen), started as a cultural movement in the 1960s, greatly inspired by the Swedish ballad tradition and its modern representatives such as Olle Adolphson and Cornelis Vreeswijk. Some of its prominent representatives are Ole Paus, Lillebjørn Nilsen and Finn Kalvik; Alf Prøysen was also called a visesanger, and influenced but in many ways preceded the Norwegian "ballad wave."

== Literature ==
- Lönnroth, L., Delblanc S., Göransson, S. Den svenska litteraturen (ed.), 3 volumes (1999)
