= Sven Scholander =

Swedish musician (1860–1936)

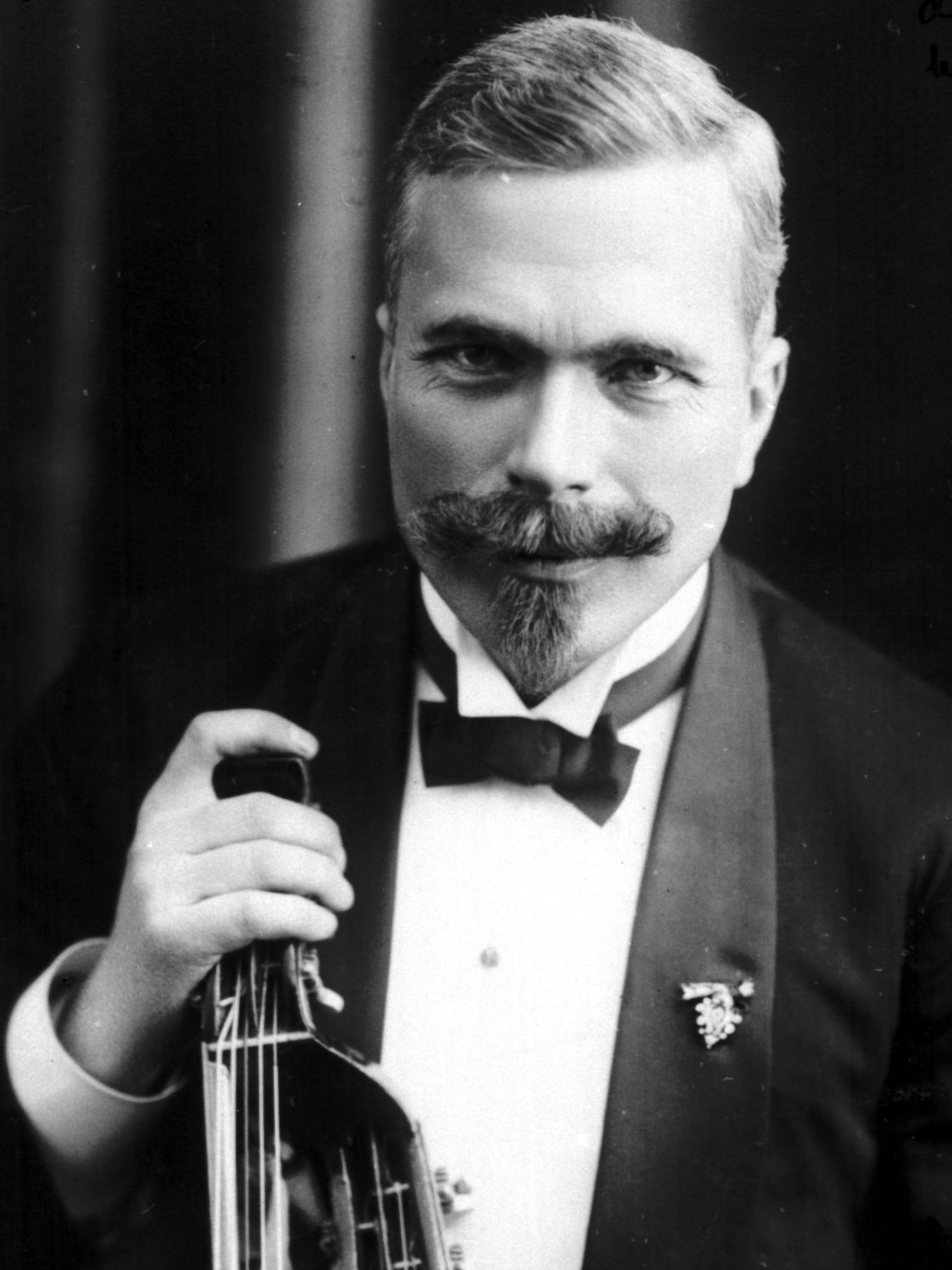
- Born: 21 April 1860; Stockholm, Sweden–Norway
- Died: 14 December 1936 (aged 76); Djursholm, Sweden
- Occupations: Musician; singer; composer; actor; sculptor; businessman
- Years active: 1895–1932
- Spouse: Charlotta Sofia Johanna von Bahr (1889–1932)

Sven Scholander (21 April 1860 – 14 December 1936) was a Swedish musician, singer, composer and sculptor. His musical innovations led to a revival in Swedish lute playing whilst his solo performances of Carl Michael Bellman reintroduced the works in their original form.

== Sculptor ==
Born into a large and musical family, Scholander was the son of Fredrik Wilhelm Scholander, an architect whose avocations included painting, poetry and singing to his own guitar accompaniment.

After studying music and art in Sweden and abroad, Sven Scholander began working in the late 1880s as an architectural sculptor and art teacher. In the former capacity he helped with the restoration of Bernard Foucquet’s Enleveringsgruppen (Abduction group), depicting Romulus and Hersilia and other instances of bride kidnapping in ancient mythology. The statues, on the southern façade of Stockholm Palace, were not cast in bronze until 1897, nearly two centuries after Foucquet had created the molds.

== Businessman ==
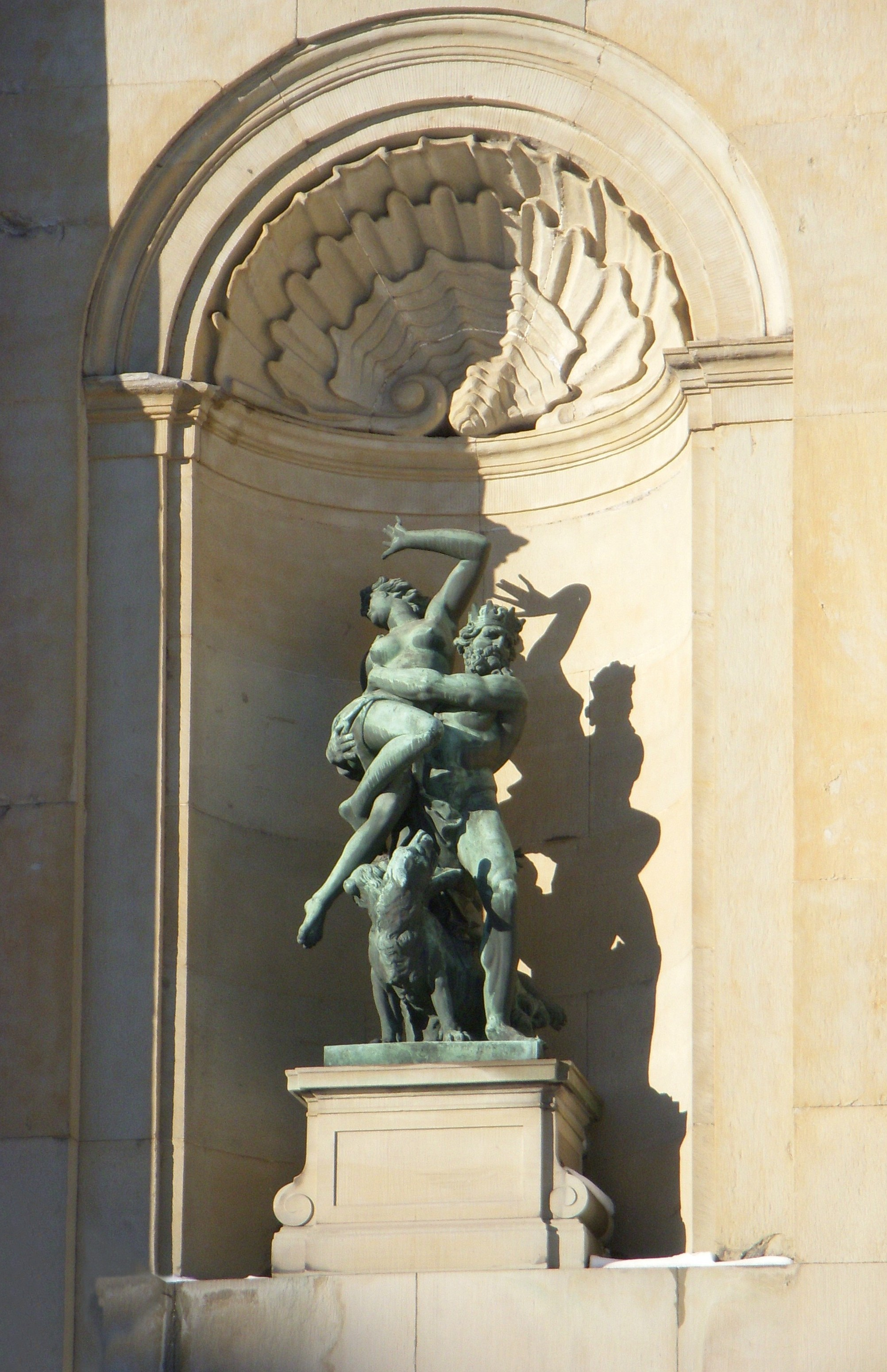
Romulus and Hersilia by Bernard Foucquet

In addition to his artistic pursuits Scholander was a businessman, who opened a retail outlet for the Hasselblad Company in 1895, where he sold cameras and photographic equipment. He was also active in the publishing industry and in 1915 became the managing director of the AB Nordiska Musikförlaget.

== Performer ==
Despite his involvement in art and business, Scholander always had a keen interest in music. While in his teens he began playing the guitar but soon switched to the lute, an instrument whose limitations he overcame by tuning the strings in the manner of a guitar. This so-called "lute guitar" or "Scholander-lute" offered greater flexibility and in Scholander's hands, wrote one critic, "resembled an entire orchestra."

Sven Scholander debuted as a lute-playing balladeer in 1891 and for the next four decades toured Scandinavia, Germany and other European countries with multilingual programs of songs and ballads. He had a vast repertoire but gave special emphasis to the works of Carl Michael Bellman. In fact, his concerts were often referred to as "Bellman evenings".

In the late 19th century Bellman's songs and epistles were commonly sung by male quartets, but Scholander, performing alone, brought the material to life with superb musicianship, precise diction, facial expressions and even sound effects. His dramatic interpretations, not unlike those of Bellman himself, influenced the Swedish troubadours who came after him: Birger Sjöberg, Evert Taube and countless others.

Scholander used his acting skills, developed from years on the concert stage, in three Swedish films. In 1924 he had a major role in The Saga of Gösta Berling, where he appeared alongside Greta Garbo.

== America ==
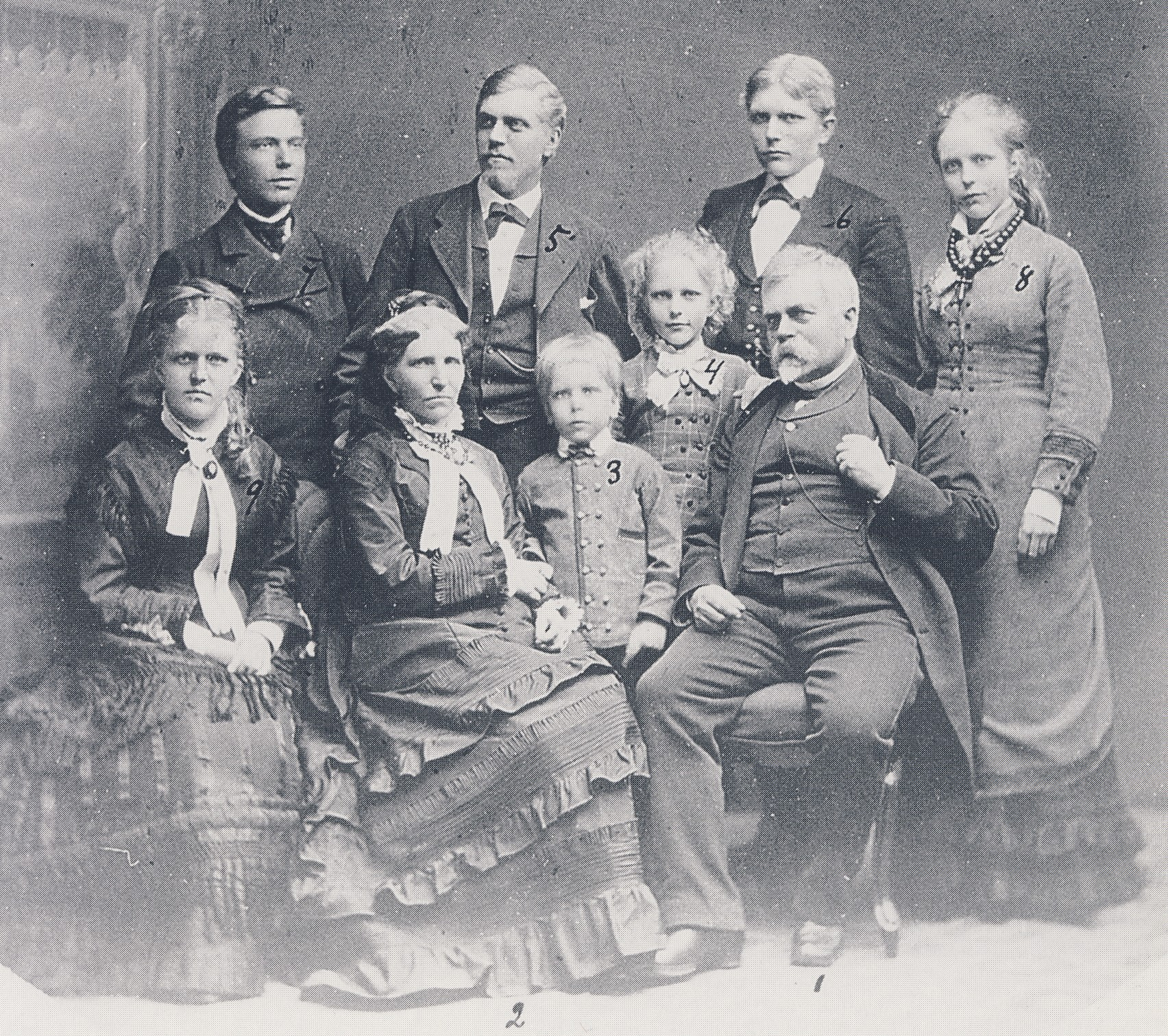
Architect Fredrik Wilhelm Scholander and family 1875

Scholander’s younger brother Torkel Scholander (1871-1962) was likewise a singer and lute player. While touring the United States in 1911 he recorded twenty sides for Victor Records. Twelve years later the troubadour Gunnar Bohman (1882-1963) crossed the Atlantic and performed Bellman songs for Swedish-American audiences from coast to coast. Although Sven Scholander performed throughout Scandinavia and continental Europe, he never visited America or became popular with his countrymen there.

Scholander's foremost American disciple was the folksinger Richard Dyer-Bennet, who journeyed to Stockholm in 1935 and visited the singer a year before his death. The meeting had a profound effect on Dyer-Bennet, who later recalled: "He looked straight at me and spun tale after tale as though singing out of his own life. He sang of soldiers, sailors, young lovers; he sang dialogues between mother and daughter, altercations between birds and animals, descriptions of mountain and countryside. A pageant of the ages seemed to pass before my eyes, and it was all evoked by the husky voice of this old man and by his simple but exactly appropriate accompaniments on the lute."

Dyer-Bennet absorbed a good deal of Scholander's repertoire and adopted his credo as well: "The value lies inherent in the song, not in the regional mannerisms or colloquialisms."

== Legacy ==
As a composer, Scholander set the lyrics of Dan Andersson, Gustaf Fröding, Erik Axel Karlfeldt and Elias Sehlstedt to music. Between 1924 and 1930 he published ten volumes of these songs and ballads. Scholander made a number of recordings in Swedish, German and French, some of which can be found at video-sharing websites or digital music download services. In 2010 recordings by Sven Scholander, Torkel Scholander and Gunnar Bohman were reissued on a Bellman tribute album.

== See also ==
- Swedish ballad tradition
