= Radial engine =

Piston engine configuration

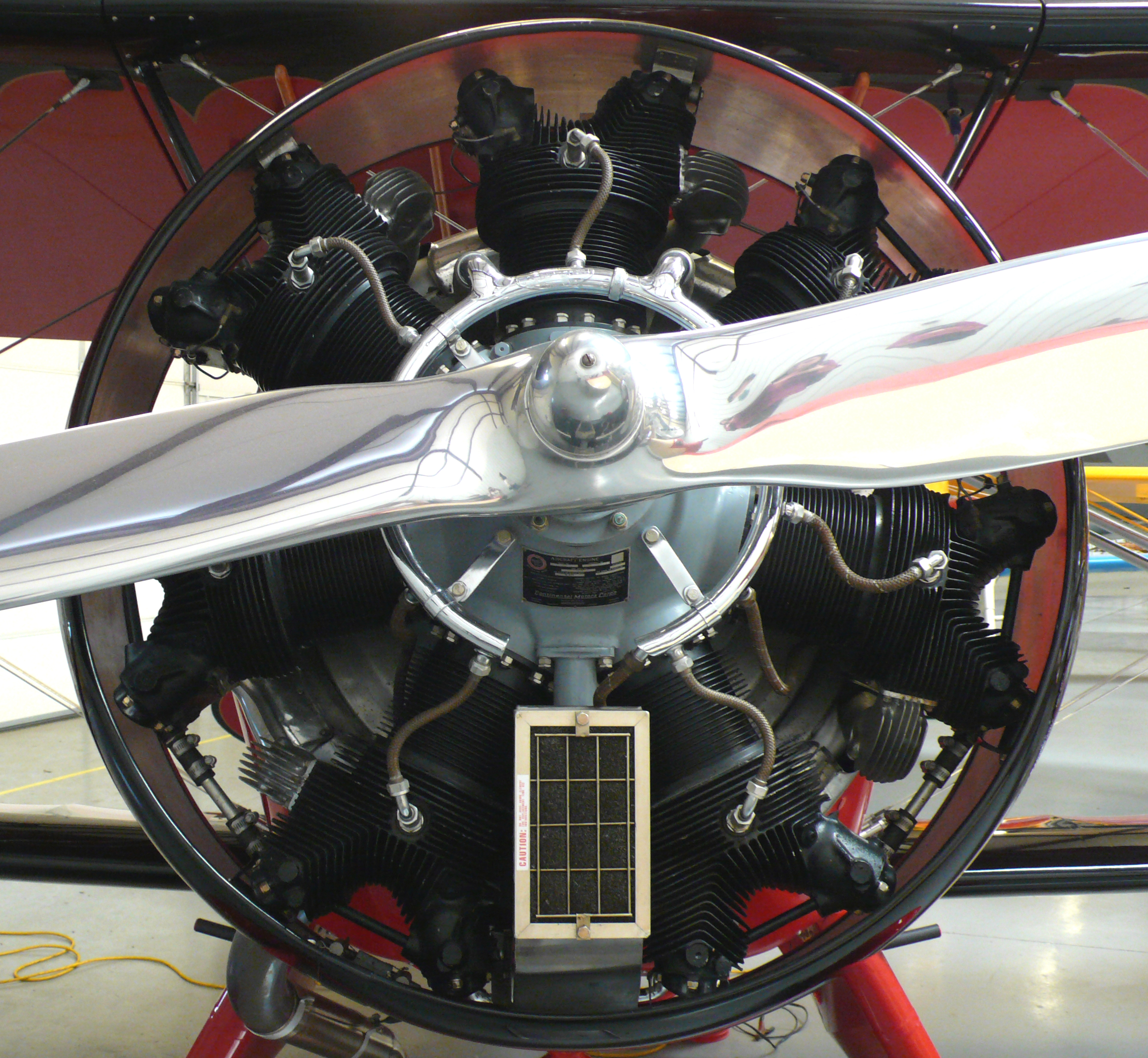
Radial engine in a biplane

The radial engine is a reciprocating type internal combustion engine configuration in which the cylinders "radiate" outward from a central crankcase like the spokes of a wheel. It resembles a stylized star when viewed from the front.

The radial configuration was commonly used for aircraft engines before gas turbine engines became predominant.

Moving parts showing operation of a typical small five-cylinder radial. Pistons are in gold and valves in pink, master rod in pale purple, slaved connecting rods in blue, crankshaft / counterbalance in gray and timing ring and cams in red.

== Engine operation ==
Another example of the engine operation

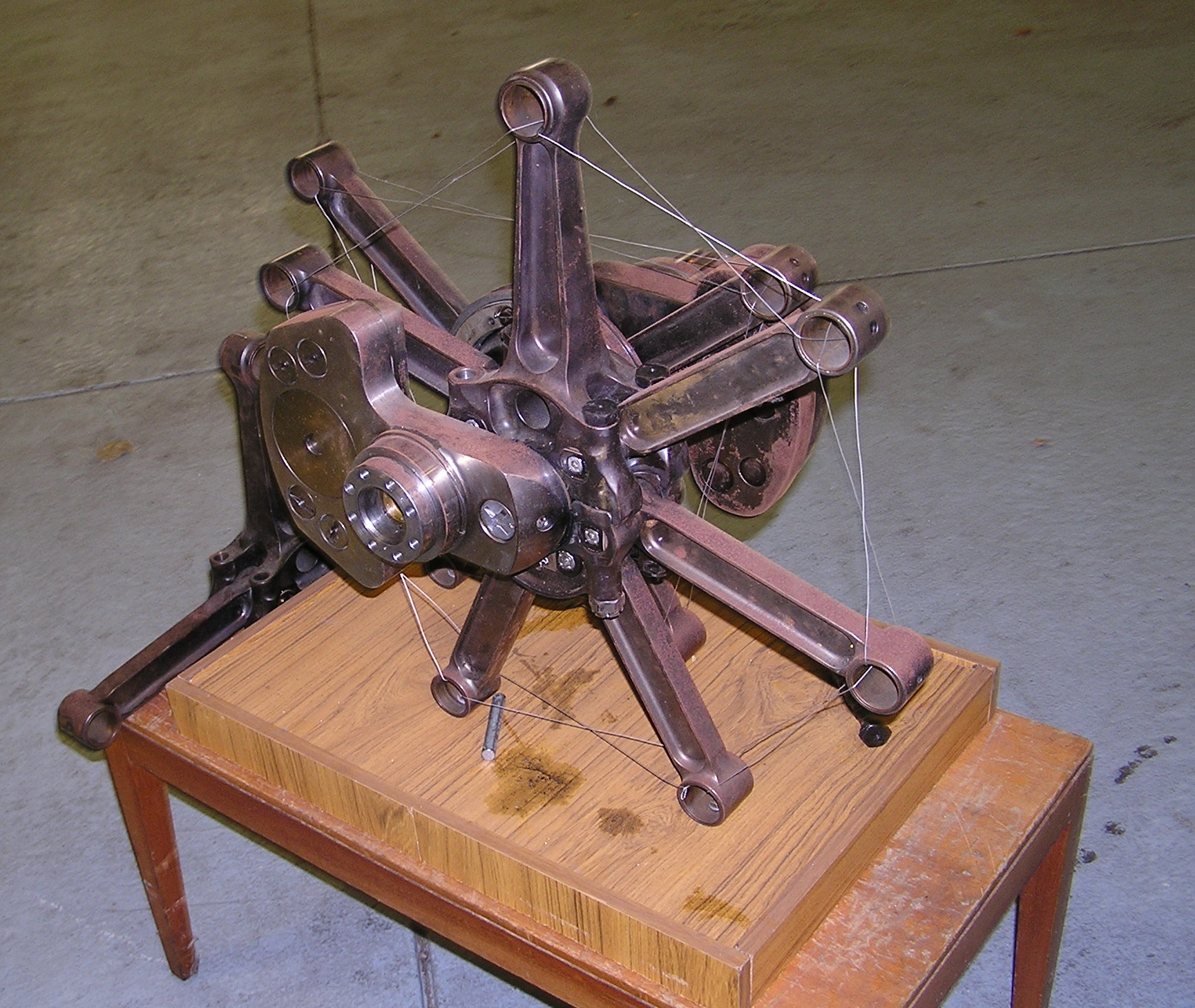
Master rod (upright) and slaved connecting rods from a two-row, fourteen-cylinder Pratt & Whitney R-1535 Twin Wasp Junior

Since the axes of the cylinders are coplanar, the connecting rods cannot all be directly attached to the crankshaft unless mechanically complex forked connecting rods are used, none of which have been successful. Instead, the pistons are connected to the crankshaft with a master-and-articulating-rod assembly. One piston, the uppermost one in the animation, has a master rod with a direct attachment to the crankshaft. The remaining pistons pin their connecting rods' attachments to rings around the edge of the master rod. Extra "rows" of radial cylinders can be added in order to increase the capacity of the engine without adding to its diameter.

Four-stroke radials have an odd number of cylinders per row, so that a consistent every-other-piston firing order can be maintained, providing smooth operation. For example, on a five-cylinder engine the firing order is 1, 3, 5, 2, 4, and back to cylinder 1. Moreover, this always leaves a one-piston gap between the piston on its combustion stroke and the piston on compression. The active stroke directly helps compress the next cylinder to fire, making the motion more uniform. If an even number of cylinders were used, an equally timed firing cycle would not be feasible.

As with most four-strokes, the crankshaft takes two revolutions to complete the four strokes of each piston (intake, compression, combustion, exhaust). The camshaft ring is geared to spin slower and in the opposite direction to the crankshaft. Its cam lobes are placed in two rows; one for the intake valves and one for the exhaust valves. The radial engine normally uses fewer cam lobes than other types. For example, in the engine in the animated illustration, four cam lobes serve all 10 valves across the five cylinders, whereas 10 would be required for a typical inline engine with the same number of cylinders and valves.

Most radial engines use overhead poppet valves driven by pushrods and lifters on a cam plate which is concentric with the crankshaft, with a few smaller radials, like the Kinner B-5 and Russian Shvetsov M-11, using individual camshafts within the crankcase for each cylinder. A few engines use sleeve valves such as the 14-cylinder Bristol Hercules and the 18-cylinder Bristol Centaurus, which are quieter and smoother running but require much tighter manufacturing tolerances.

== History ==
=== Aircraft ===
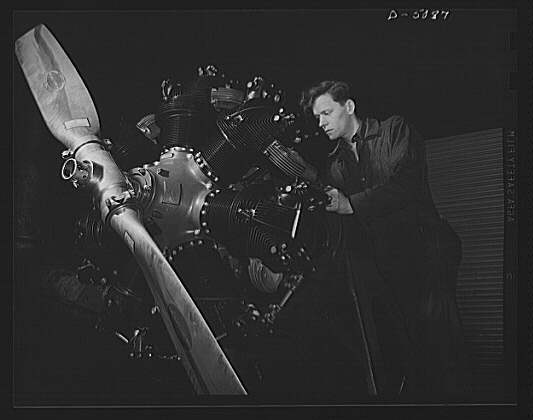
Continental radial, 1944

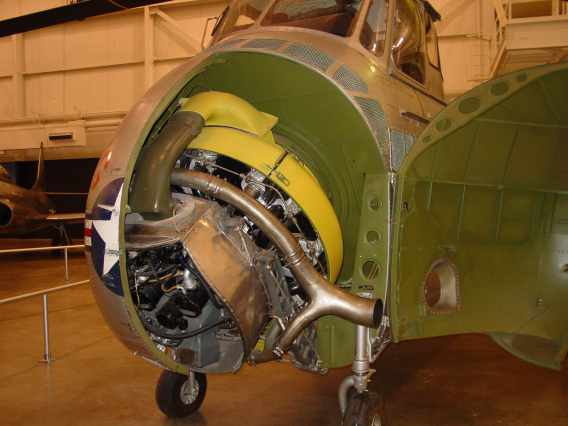
Pratt & Whitney R-1340 radial mounted in Sikorsky H-19 helicopter

C. M. Manly constructed a water-cooled five-cylinder radial engine in 1901, a conversion of one of Stephen Balzer's rotary engines, for Langley's Aerodrome aircraft. Manly's engine produced 52 hp (39 kW) at 950 rpm.

In 1903–1904 Jacob Ellehammer used his experience constructing motorcycles to build the world's first air-cooled radial engine, a three-cylinder engine which he used as the basis for a more powerful five-cylinder model in 1907. This was installed in his triplane and made a number of short free-flight hops.

Another early radial engine was the three-cylinder Anzani, originally built as a W3 "fan" configuration, one of which powered Louis Blériot's Blériot XI across the English Channel. Before 1914, Alessandro Anzani had developed radial engines ranging from 3 cylinders (spaced 120° apart) — early enough to have been used on a few French-built examples of the famous Blériot XI from the original Blériot factory — to a massive 20-cylinder engine of 200 hp (150 kW), with its cylinders arranged in four rows of five cylinders apiece.

Most radial engines are air-cooled, but one of the most successful of the early radial engines (and the earliest "stationary" design produced for World War I combat aircraft) was the Salmson 9Z series of nine-cylinder water-cooled radial engines that were produced in large numbers. Georges Canton and Pierre Unné patented the original engine design in 1909, offering it to the Salmson company; the engine was often known as the Canton-Unné.

From 1909 to 1919 the radial engine was overshadowed by its close relative, the rotary engine, which differed from the so-called "stationary" radial in that the crankcase and cylinders revolved with the propeller. It was similar in concept to the later radial, the main difference being that the propeller was bolted to the engine, and the crankshaft to the airframe. The problem of the cooling of the cylinders, a major factor with the early "stationary" radials, was alleviated by the engine generating its own cooling airflow.

In World War I many French and other Allied aircraft flew with Gnome, Le Rhône, Clerget, and Bentley rotary engines, the ultimate examples of which reached 250 hp (190 kW) although none of those over 160 hp (120 kW) were successful. By 1917 rotary engine development was lagging behind new inline and V-type engines, which by 1918 were producing as much as 400 hp (300 kW), and were powering almost all of the new French and British combat aircraft.

Most German aircraft of the time used water-cooled inline 6-cylinder engines. Motorenfabrik Oberursel made licensed copies of the Gnome and Le Rhône rotary powerplants, and Siemens-Halske built their own designs, including the Siemens-Halske Sh.III eleven-cylinder rotary engine, which was unusual for the period in being geared through a bevel geartrain in the rear end of the crankcase without the crankshaft being firmly mounted to the aircraft's airframe, so that the engine's internal working components (fully internal crankshaft "floating" in its crankcase bearings, with its conrods and pistons) were spun in the opposing direction to the crankcase and cylinders, which still rotated as the propeller itself did since it was still firmly fastened to the crankcase's frontside, as with regular umlaufmotor German rotaries.

By the end of the war the rotary engine had reached the limits of the design, particularly in regard to the amount of fuel and air that could be drawn into the cylinders through the hollow crankshaft, while advances in both metallurgy and cylinder cooling finally allowed stationary radial engines to supersede rotary engines. In the early 1920s Le Rhône converted a number of their rotary engines into stationary radial engines.

By 1918 the potential advantages of air-cooled radials over the water-cooled inline engine and air-cooled rotary engine that had powered World War I aircraft were appreciated but were unrealized. British designers had produced the ABC Dragonfly radial in 1917, but were unable to resolve the cooling problems, and it was not until the 1920s that Bristol and Armstrong Siddeley produced reliable air-cooled radials such as the Bristol Jupiter and the Armstrong Siddeley Jaguar.

In the United States the National Advisory Committee for Aeronautics (NACA) noted in 1920 that air-cooled radials could offer an increase in power-to-weight ratio and reliability; by 1921 the U.S. Navy had announced it would only order aircraft fitted with air-cooled radials and other naval air arms followed suit. Charles Lawrance's J-1 engine was developed in 1922 with Navy funding, and using aluminum cylinders with steel liners ran for an unprecedented 300 hours, at a time when 50 hours endurance was normal. At the urging of the Army and Navy the Wright Aeronautical Corporation bought Lawrance's company, and subsequent engines were built under the Wright name. The radial engines gave confidence to Navy pilots performing long-range overwater flights.

Wright's 225 hp (168 kW) J-5 Whirlwind radial engine of 1925 was widely claimed as "the first truly reliable aircraft engine". Wright employed Giuseppe Mario Bellanca to design an aircraft to showcase it, and the result was the Wright-Bellanca WB-1, which first flew later that year. The J-5 was used on many advanced aircraft of the day, including Charles Lindbergh's Spirit of St. Louis, in which he made the first solo trans-Atlantic flight.

In 1925 the American Pratt & Whitney company was founded, competing with Wright's radial engines. Pratt & Whitney's initial offering, the R-1340 Wasp, was test run later that year, beginning a line of engines over the next 25 years that included the 14-cylinder, twin-row Pratt & Whitney R-1830 Twin Wasp. More Twin Wasps were produced than any other aviation piston engine in the history of aviation; nearly 175,000 were built.

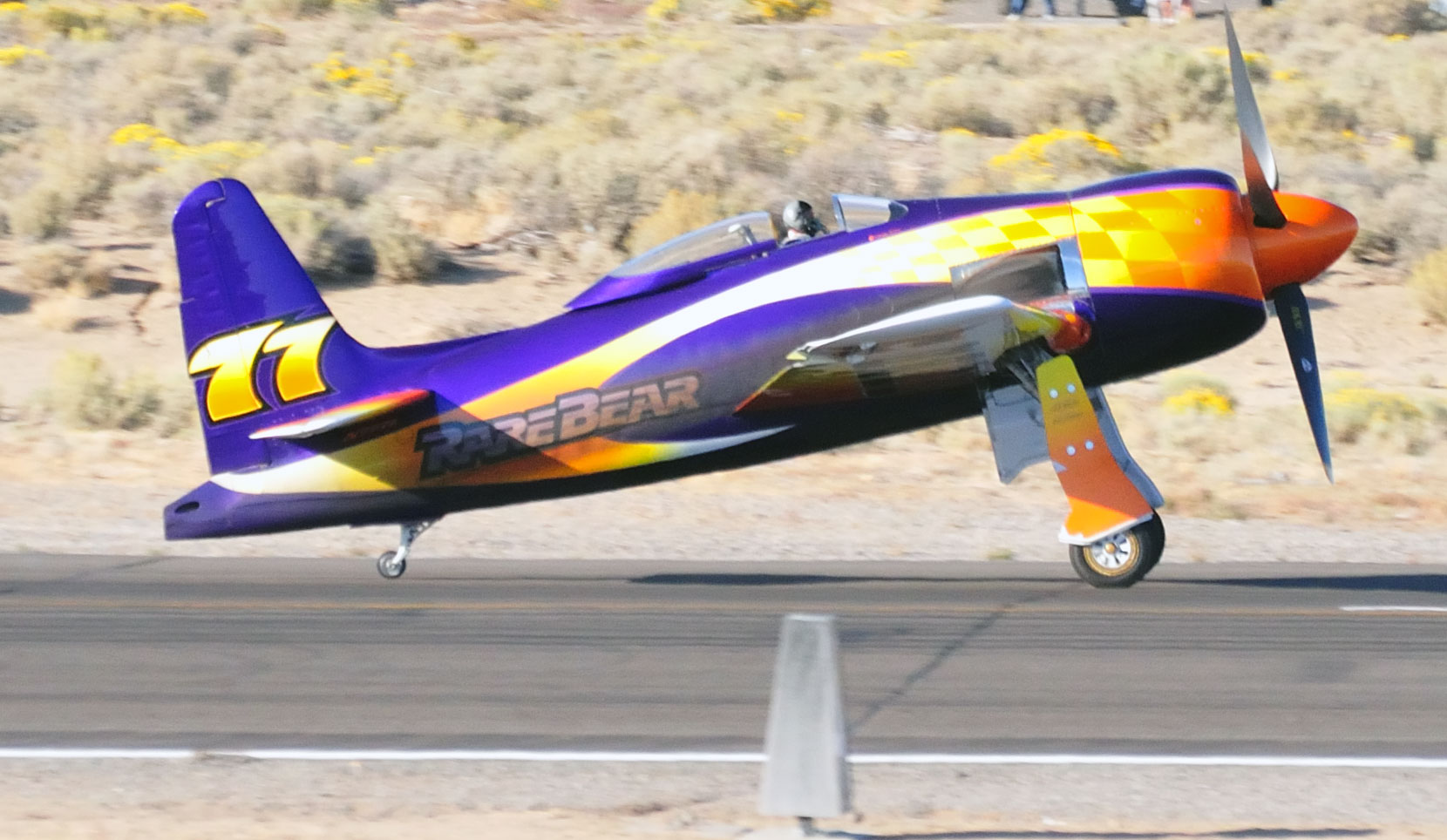
Rare Bear

In the United Kingdom the Bristol Aeroplane Company was concentrating on developing radials such as the Jupiter, Mercury, and sleeve valve Hercules radials. Germany, Japan, and the Soviet Union started with building licensed versions of the Armstrong Siddeley, Bristol, Wright, or Pratt & Whitney radials before producing their own improved versions. France continued its development of various rotary engines but also produced engines derived from Bristol designs, especially the Jupiter.

Although other piston configurations and turboprops have taken over in modern propeller-driven aircraft, Rare Bear, which is a Grumman F8F Bearcat equipped with a Wright R-3350 Duplex-Cyclone radial engine, is still the fastest piston-powered aircraft.

125,334 of the American twin-row, 18-cylinder Pratt & Whitney R-2800 Double Wasp, with a displacement of 2,800 in^{3} (46 L) and between 2,000 and 2,400 hp (1,500-1,800 kW), powered the American single-engine Vought F4U Corsair, Grumman F6F Hellcat, Republic P-47 Thunderbolt, twin-engine Martin B-26 Marauder, Douglas A-26 Invader, Northrop P-61 Black Widow, etc. The same firm's aforementioned smaller-displacement (at 30 litres), Twin Wasp 14-cylinder twin-row radial was used as the main engine design for the B-24 Liberator, PBY Catalina, and Douglas C-47, each design being among the production leaders in all-time production numbers for each type of airframe design.

The American Wright Cyclone series twin-row radials powered American warplanes: the nearly-43 litre displacement, 14-cylinder Twin Cyclone powered the single-engine Grumman TBF Avenger, twin-engine North American B-25 Mitchell, and some versions of the Douglas A-20 Havoc, with the massive twin-row, nearly 55-litre displacement, 18-cylinder Duplex-Cyclone powering the four-engine Boeing B-29 Superfortress and others.

The Soviet Shvetsov OKB-19 design bureau was the sole source of design for all of the Soviet government factory-produced radial engines used in its World War II aircraft, starting with the Shvetsov M-25 (itself based on the American Wright Cyclone 9's design) and going on to design the 41-litre displacement Shvetsov ASh-82 fourteen cylinder radial for fighters, and the massive, 58-litre displacement Shvetsov ASh-73 eighteen-cylinder radial in 1946 - the smallest-displacement radial design from the Shvetsov OKB during the war was the indigenously designed, 8.6 litre displacement Shvetsov M-11 five cylinder radial.

Over 28,000 of the German 42-litre displacement, 14-cylinder, two-row BMW 801, with between 1,560 and 2,000 PS (1,540-1,970 hp, or 1,150-1,470 kW), powered the German single-seat, single-engine Focke-Wulf Fw 190 Würger, and twin-engine Junkers Ju 88.

In Japan, most airplanes were powered by air-cooled radial engines like the 14-cylinder Mitsubishi Zuisei (11,903 units, e.g. Kawasaki Ki-45), Mitsubishi Kinsei (12,228 units, e.g. Aichi D3A), Mitsubishi Kasei (16,486 units, e.g. Kawanishi H8K), Nakajima Sakae (30,233 units, e.g. Mitsubishi A6M and Nakajima Ki-43), and 18-cylinder Nakajima Homare (9,089 units, e.g. Nakajima Ki-84). The Kawasaki Ki-61 and Yokosuka D4Y were rare examples of Japanese liquid-cooled inline engine aircraft at that time but later, they were also redesigned to fit radial engines as the Kawasaki Ki-100 and Yokosuka D4Y3.

In Britain, Bristol produced both sleeve valved and conventional poppet valved radials: of the sleeve valved designs, more than 57,400 Hercules engines powered the Vickers Wellington, Short Stirling, Handley Page Halifax, and some versions of the Avro Lancaster, over 8,000 of the pioneering sleeve-valved Bristol Perseus were used in various types, and more than 2,500 of the largest-displacement production British radial from the Bristol firm to use sleeve valving, the Bristol Centaurus were used to power the Hawker Tempest II and Sea Fury. The same firm's poppet-valved radials included: around 32,000 of Bristol Pegasus used in the Short Sunderland, Handley Page Hampden, and Fairey Swordfish and over 20,000 examples of the firm's 1925-origin nine-cylinder Mercury were used to power the Westland Lysander, Bristol Blenheim, and Blackburn Skua.

=== Tanks ===
In the years leading up to World War II, as the need for armored vehicles was realized, designers were faced with the problem of how to power the vehicles, and turned to using aircraft engines, among them radial types. The radial aircraft engines provided greater power-to-weight ratios and were more reliable than conventional inline vehicle engines available at the time. This reliance had a downside though: if the engines were mounted vertically, as in the M3 Lee and M4 Sherman, their comparatively large diameter gave the tank a higher silhouette than designs using inline engines.

The Continental R-670, a 7-cylinder radial aero engine which first flew in 1931, became a widely used tank powerplant, being installed in the M1 Combat Car, M2 Light Tank, M3 Stuart, M3 Lee, and LVT-2 Water Buffalo.

The Guiberson T-1020, a 9-cylinder radial diesel aero engine, was used in the M1A1E1, while the Continental R975 saw service in the M4 Sherman, M7 Priest, M18 Hellcat tank destroyer, and the M44 self propelled howitzer.

=== Modern radials ===
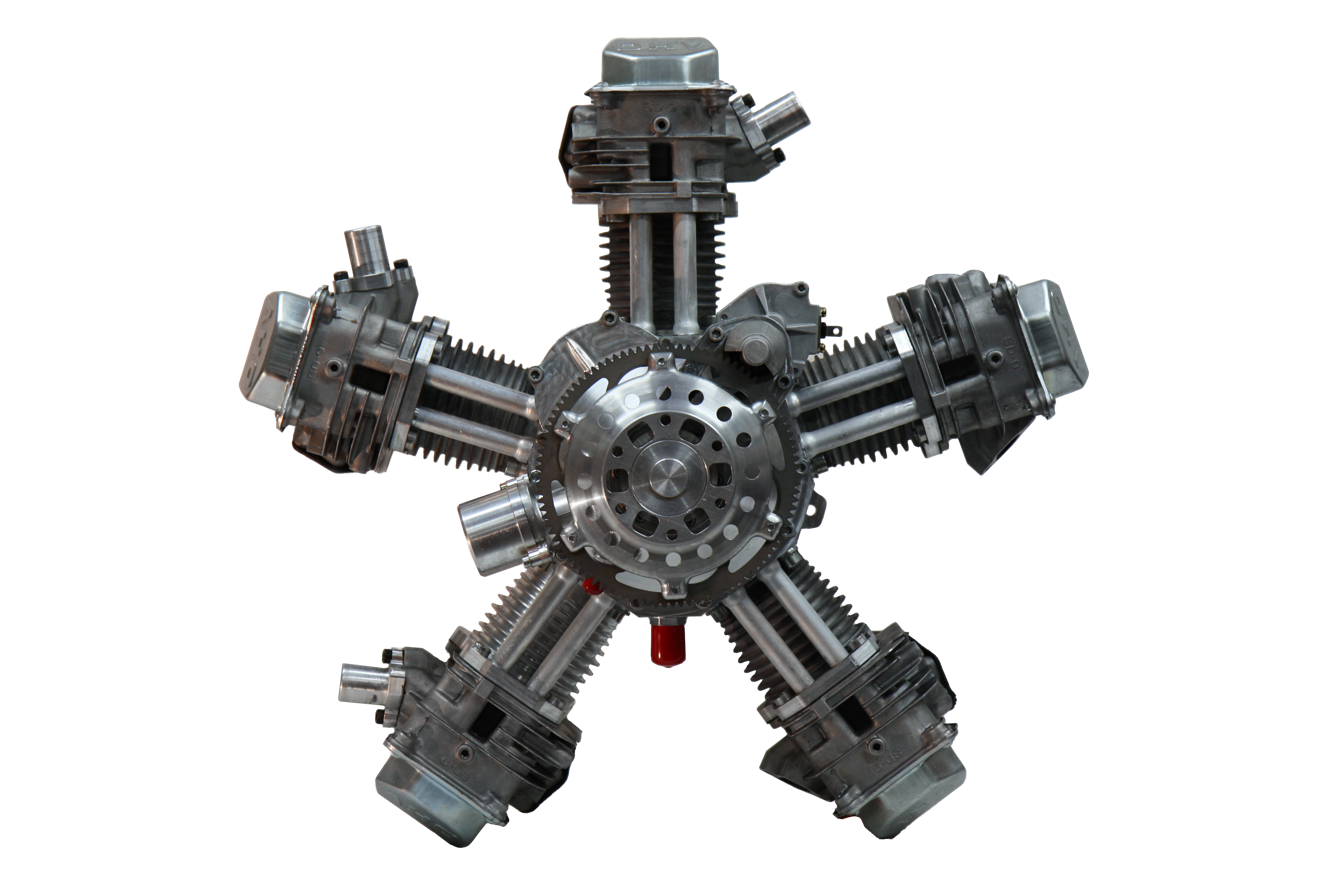
Four-stroke aircraft radial engine Scarlett mini 5

A number of companies continue to build radials today. Vedeneyev produces the M-14P radial of 360–450 hp (270–340 kW) as used on Yakovlev and Sukhoi aerobatic aircraft. The M-14P is also used by builders of homebuilt aircraft, such as the Culp Special, and Culp Sopwith Pup, Pitts S12 "Monster" and the Murphy "Moose". In Poland, WSK PZL Kalisz produces the Shvetsov ASh-62 engine. A version with direct injection has also been developed. 110 hp (82 kW) 7-cylinder and 150 hp (110 kW) 9-cylinder engines are available from Australia's Rotec Aerosport. HCI Aviation offers the R180 5-cylinder (75 hp (56 kW)) and R220 7-cylinder (110 hp (82 kW)), available "ready to fly" and as a build-it-yourself kit. Verner Motor of the Czech Republic builds several radial engines ranging in power from 25 to 150 hp (19 to 112 kW). Miniature radial engines for model airplanes are available from O. S. Engines, Saito Seisakusho of Japan, and Shijiazhuang of China, and Evolution (designed by Wolfgang Seidel of Germany, and made in India) and Technopower in the US.

== Comparison with inline engines ==
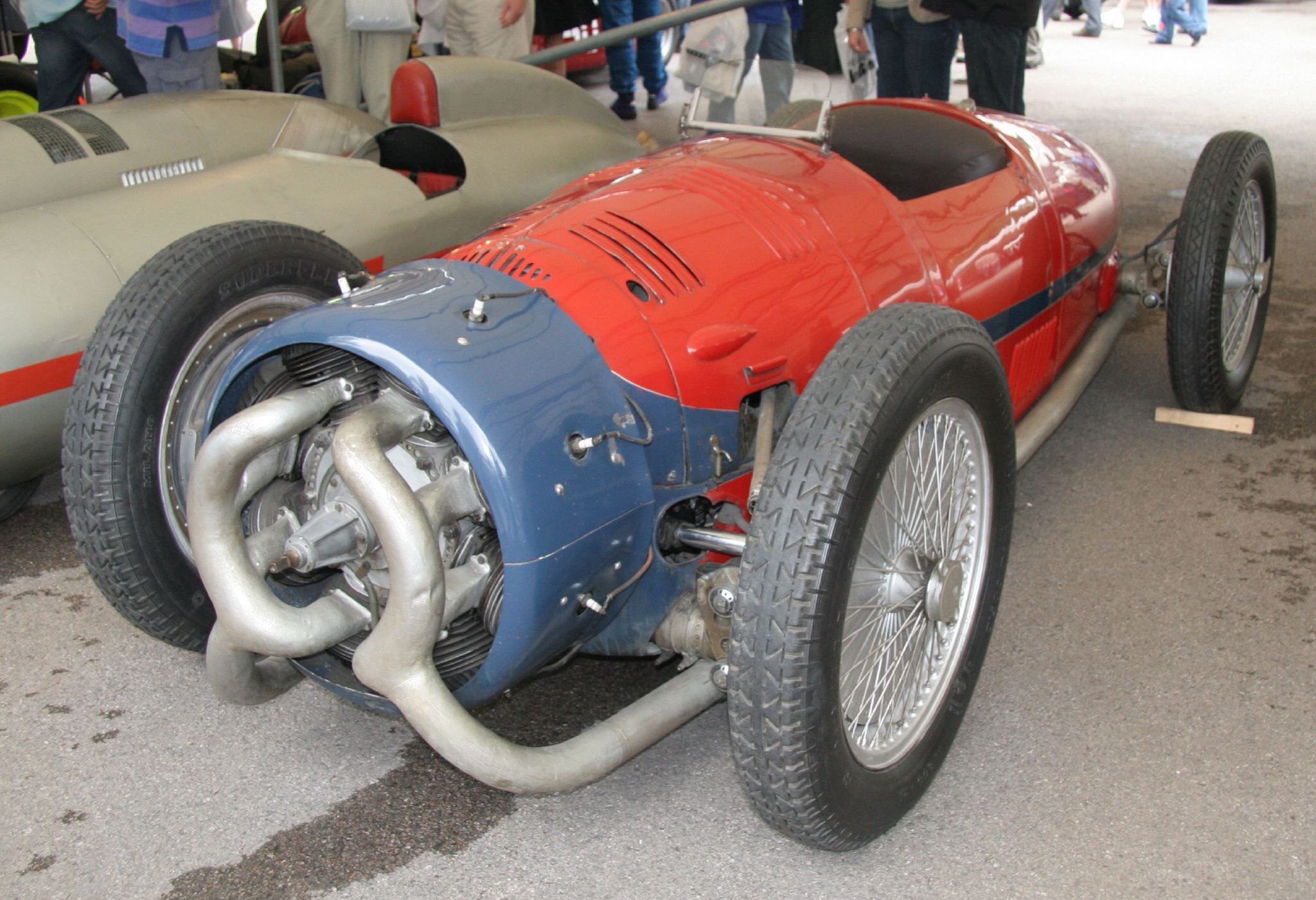
The 1935 Monaco-Trossi race car, a rare example of automobile use

Liquid cooling systems are generally more vulnerable to battle damage. Even minor shrapnel damage can easily result in a loss of coolant and consequent engine overheating, while an air-cooled radial engine may be largely unaffected by minor damage. Radials have shorter and stiffer crankshafts, a single-bank radial engine needing only two crankshaft bearings as opposed to the seven required for a liquid-cooled, six-cylinder, inline engine of similar stiffness.

While a single-bank radial permits all cylinders to be cooled equally, the same is not true for multi-row engines where the rear cylinders can be affected by the heat coming off the front row, and air flow being masked.

A potential disadvantage of radial engines is that having the cylinders exposed to the airflow increases drag considerably. The answer was the addition of specially designed cowlings with baffles to force the air between the cylinders. The first effective drag-reducing cowling that didn't impair engine cooling was the British Townend ring or "drag ring" which formed a narrow band around the engine covering the cylinder heads, reducing drag. The National Advisory Committee for Aeronautics studied the problem, developing the NACA cowling which further reduced drag and improved cooling. Nearly all aircraft radial engines since have used NACA-type cowlings. (Note: It has been claimed that the NACA cowling generated extra thrust due to the Meredith Effect, whereby the heat added to the air being forced through the ducts between the cylinders expanded the exhausting cooling air, producing thrust when forced through a nozzle. The Meredith effect requires high airspeed and careful design to generate a suitable high speed exhaust of the heated air – the NACA cowling was not designed to achieve this, nor would the effect have been significant at low airspeeds. The effect was put to use in the radiators of several mid-1940s aircraft that used liquid-cooled engines such as the Spitfire and Mustang, and it offered a minor improvement in later radial-engined aircraft, including the Fw 190.)

While inline liquid-cooled engines continued to be common in new designs until late in World War II, radial engines dominated afterwards until overtaken by jet engines, with the late-war Hawker Sea Fury and Grumman F8F Bearcat, two of the fastest production piston-engined aircraft ever built, using radial engines.

== Hydrolock ==
Whenever a radial engine remains shut down for more than a few minutes, oil or fuel may drain into the combustion chambers of the lower cylinders or accumulate in the lower intake pipes, ready to be drawn into the cylinders when the engine starts. As the piston approaches top dead center (TDC) of the compression stroke, this liquid, being incompressible, stops piston movement. Starting or attempting to start the engine in such condition may result in a bent or broken connecting rod.

== Other types of radial engine ==
=== Multi-row radials ===
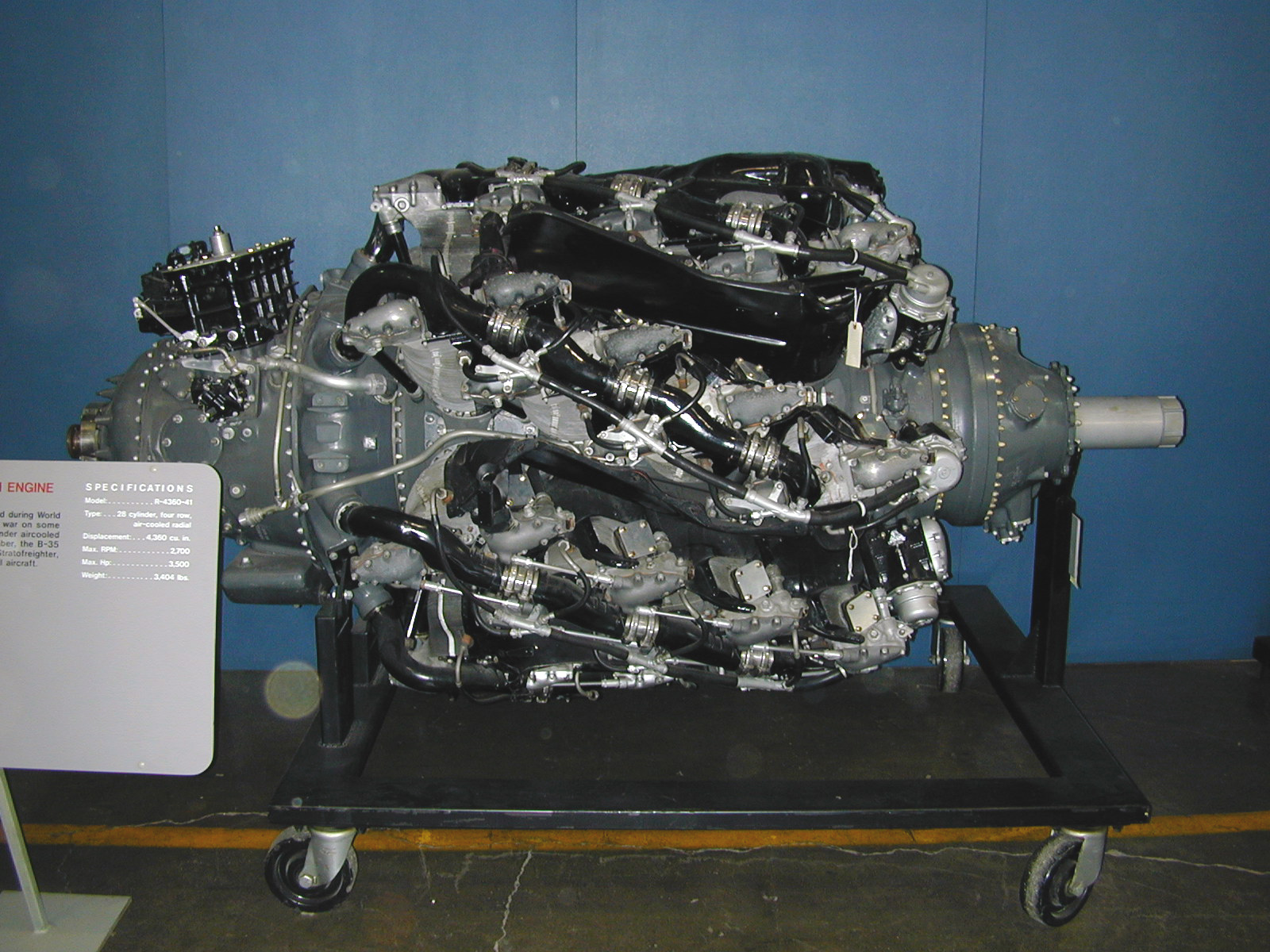
The Wasp Major, a four-row radial

Originally radial engines had one row of cylinders, but as engine sizes increased it became necessary to add extra rows. The first radial-configuration engine known to use a twin-row design was the 160 hp Gnôme "Double Lambda" rotary engine of 1912, designed as a 14-cylinder twin-row version of the firm's 80 hp Lambda single-row seven-cylinder rotary, however reliability and cooling problems limited its success.

Two-row designs began to appear in large numbers during the 1930s, when aircraft size and weight grew to the point where single-row engines of the required power were simply too large to be practical. Two-row designs often had cooling problems with the rear bank of cylinders, but a variety of baffles and fins were introduced that largely eliminated these problems. The downside was a relatively large frontal area that had to be left open to provide enough airflow, which increased drag. This led to significant arguments in the industry in the late 1930s about the possibility of using radials for high-speed aircraft like modern fighters.

The solution was introduced with the BMW 801 14-cylinder twin-row radial. Kurt Tank designed a new cooling system for this engine that used a high-speed fan to blow compressed air into channels that carry air to the middle of the banks, where a series of baffles directed the air over all of the cylinders. This allowed the cowling to be tightly fitted around the engine, reducing drag, while still providing (after a number of experiments and modifications) enough cooling air to the rear. This basic concept was soon copied by many other manufacturers, and many late-WWII aircraft returned to the radial design as newer and much larger designs began to be introduced. Examples include the Bristol Centaurus in the Hawker Sea Fury, and the Shvetsov ASh-82 in the Lavochkin La-7.

For even greater power, adding further rows was not considered viable due to the difficulty of providing the required airflow to the rear banks. Larger engines were designed, mostly using water cooling although this greatly increased complexity and eliminated some of the advantages of the radial air-cooled design. One example of this concept is the BMW 803, which never entered service.

A major study into the airflow around radials using wind tunnels and other systems was carried out in the US, and demonstrated that ample airflow was available with careful design. This led to the R-4360, which has 28 cylinders arranged in a 4 row corncob configuration. The R-4360 saw service on large American aircraft in the post-World War II period. The US and Soviet Union continued experiments with larger radials, but the UK abandoned such designs in favour of newer versions of the Centaurus and rapid movement to the use of turboprops such as the Armstrong Siddeley Python and Bristol Proteus, which easily produced more power than radials without the weight or complexity.

Large radials continued to be built for other uses, although they are no longer common. An example is the 5-ton Zvezda M503 diesel engine with 42 cylinders in 6 rows of 7, displacing 143.6 litres (8,760 cu in) and producing 3,942 hp (2,940 kW). Three of these were used on the fast Osa class missile boats. Another one was the Lycoming XR-7755 which was the largest piston aircraft engine ever built in the United States with 36 cylinders totaling about 7,750 in^{3} (127 L) of displacement and a power output of 5,000 horsepower (3,700 kilowatts).

=== Diesel radials ===
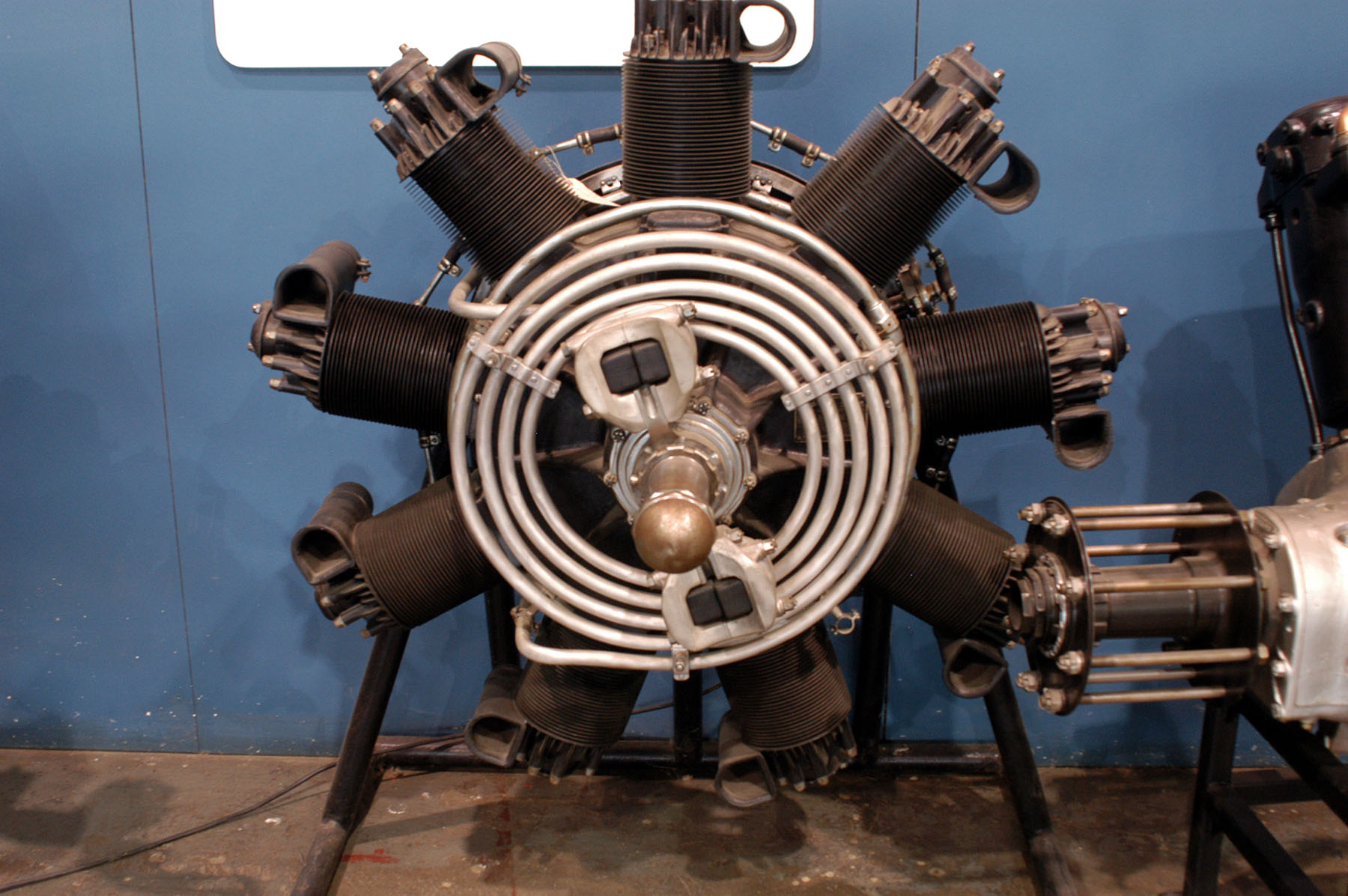
Packard DR-980 diesel radial aircraft engine

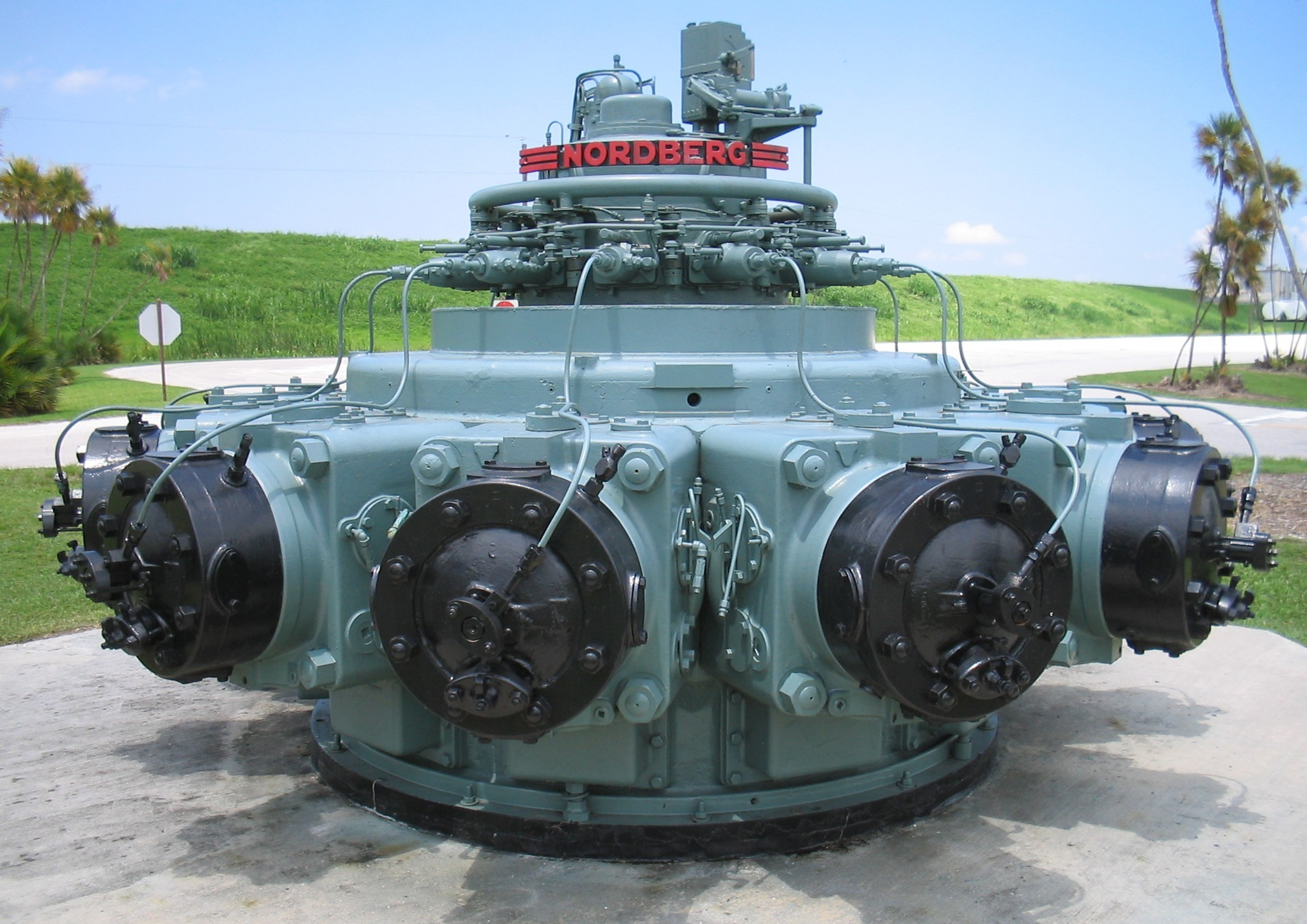
A Nordberg Manufacturing Company two-stroke diesel radial engine for power generation and pump drive purposes

While most radial engines have been produced for gasoline, there have been diesel radial engines. Two major advantages favour diesel engines — lower fuel consumption and reduced fire risk.

Packard

In 1928 Packard designed and built a 9-cylinder 980 cubic inch (16.06 litre) displacement four-stroke diesel radial aircraft engine, the 225 horsepower (168 kW) DR-980. On 28 May 1931, a DR-980 powered Bellanca CH-300, with 481 gallons of fuel, piloted by Walter Edwin Lees and Frederick Brossy set a record for staying aloft for 84 hours and 32 minutes without being refueled. This record stood for 55 years until broken by the Rutan Voyager.

Bristol

The experimental Bristol Phoenix of 1928–1932 was successfully flight tested in a Westland Wapiti and set altitude records in 1934 that lasted until World War II.

Clerget

In 1932 the French company Clerget developed the 14D, a 14-cylinder two-stroke diesel radial engine. After a series of improvements, in 1938 the 14F2 model produced 520 hp (390 kW) at 1910 rpm cruise power, with a power-to-weight ratio near that of contemporary gasoline engines and a specific fuel consumption of roughly 80% that for an equivalent gasoline engine. During WWII the research continued, but no mass-production occurred because of the Nazi occupation. By 1943 the engine had grown to produce over 1,000 hp (750 kW) with a turbocharger. After the war, the Clerget company was integrated in the SNECMA company and had plans for a 32-cylinder diesel engine of 4,000 hp (3,000 kW), but in 1947 the company abandoned piston engine development in favour of the emerging turbine engines.

Nordberg

The Nordberg Manufacturing Company of the United States developed and produced a series of large two-stroke radial diesel engines from the late 1940s for electrical production, primarily at aluminum smelters and for pumping water. They differed from most radials in that they had an even number of cylinders in a single bank (or row) and an unusual double master connecting rod. Variants were built that could be run on either diesel oil or gasoline or mixtures of both. A number of powerhouse installations utilising large numbers of these engines were made in the U.S.

EMD

Electro-Motive Diesel (EMD) built the "pancake" engines 16-184 and 16-338 for marine use.

Zoche

Zoche aero-diesels are a prototype radial design that have an even number of cylinders, either four or eight; but this is not problematic, because they are two-stroke engines, with twice the number of power strokes as a four-stroke engine per crankshaft rotation.

=== Compressed air radial engines ===
A number of radial motors operating on compressed air have been designed, mostly for use in model airplanes and in gas compressors.

=== Model radial engines ===
A number of multi-cylinder 4-stroke model engines have been commercially available in a radial configuration, beginning with the Japanese O.S. Max firm's FR5-300 five-cylinder, 3.0 cu.in. (50 cm^{3}) displacement "Sirius" radial in 1986. The American "Technopower" firm had made smaller-displacement five- and seven-cylinder model radial engines as early as 1976, but the OS firm's engine was the first mass-produced radial engine design in aeromodelling history. The rival Saito Seisakusho firm in Japan has since produced a similarly sized five-cylinder radial four-stroke model engine of their own as a direct rival to the OS design, with Saito also creating a series of three-cylinder methanol and gasoline-fueled model radial engines ranging from 0.90 cu.in. (15 cm^{3}) to 4.50 cu.in. (75 cm^{3}) in displacement, also all now available in spark-ignition format up to 84 cm^{3} displacement for use with gasoline. The German Seidel firm formerly made both seven- and nine-cylinder "large" (starting at 35 cm^{3} displacement) radio control model radial engines, mostly for glow plug ignition, with an experimental fourteen-cylinder twin-row radial being tried out - the American Evolution firm now sells the Seidel-designed radials, with their manufacturing being done in India.

== See also ==
- List of aircraft engines
- Swashplate engine
- Wankel engine
