= Baltzer =

Baltzer may refer to:

- Baltzer, Mississippi, U.S.
- Baltzer Science Publishers, Amsterdam-based defunct publisher of scientific journals

== People ==
- Baltzer Fleischer (1703–1767), Norwegian civil servant
- Anna Baltzer (born 1979), American public speaker, author and activist for Palestinian human rights
- Christian Baltzer (born 1936), French basketball player
- Eduard Baltzer (1814–1887), founder of the first German vegetarian society
- Johann Baptista Baltzer (1803–1871), German Roman Catholic theologian
- Wendy Baltzer, American veterinarian, small animal surgeon and academic

== See also ==
- Baltser, a German colony that became Krasnoarmeysk, Saratov Oblast, Russia
- Thomas Baltzar (c. 1630–1663), German violinist and composer
- Balzer
- Balcer
