= Balzer Motor Company =

Defunct American motor vehicle manufacturer

- Industry: Engines, automobiles
- Founded: 1894
- Founder: Stephen M. Balzer
- Defunct: 1902
- Headquarters: Bronx, New York, USA
- Products: Rotary engines, mechanical devices, automobiles

The Balzer Motor Company of The Bronx, New York, was founded in 1894 by Stephen M. Balzer (c.1864–1940).

== History ==
Stephen Balzer immigrated in the 1870s from the Kingdom of Hungary to the United States. He apprenticed as a watchmaker at Tiffany's. When he started his own business in 1894, a machine shop, he already held several patents for mechanical devices, among them a device for making milling cutters and his rotary engine. In the same year, he completed his first prototype automobile, a motorized quadricycle with a tube chassis, less than 6 feet (1.8 m) long and 3 feet (0.91 m) wide. It had a rotary, air-cooled, 3-cylinder engine, mounted vertically in the rear and revolving around a fixed crankshaft. Turning with the crankcase was a stub shaft. It further had a 3-speed manual transmission with no reverse. One lever engaged speeds and clutch. Each front wheel had its own bicycle fork axle which was connected by a bar which was operated by a tiller) By 1897, he had built three cars.

He developed also 5-cylinder rotary engines. When Smithsonian Institution Secretary Samuel P. Langley learned about these vehicles and their engine in 1898, he contacted Balzer, ordering one for his experimental airplane. Balzer had problems finishing this engine, delivering finally not earlier than 1900. For proper use, Langley's technical assistant, Charles M. Manly, had to modify it heavily. This became the Manly–Balzer engine, the first purpose-built aero-engine.

Balzer's business was not very successful, and he left in 1902. He still worked as a mechanic, and in 1940 he died.

== Prototype ==
On May 16, 1899, Balzer donated his prototype to the Smithsonian Institution. This was the first car ever given to the Smithsonian, and it is still in their collection.
