= Balcer =

Balcer is a surname. Notable people with the surname include:

- Bethany Balcer (born 1997), American soccer player
- James Balcer (born 1950), American politician
- Léon Balcer (1917–1991), Canadian politician
- Mieczysław Balcer (1906–1995), Polish footballer
- René Balcer (born 1954), Canadian television writer, director and producer

== See also ==
- Balcer, Podlaskie Voivodeship, Polish village
- Baltzer
- Balzer (disambiguation)
