= Solar constant =

Intensity of sunlight or solar constant

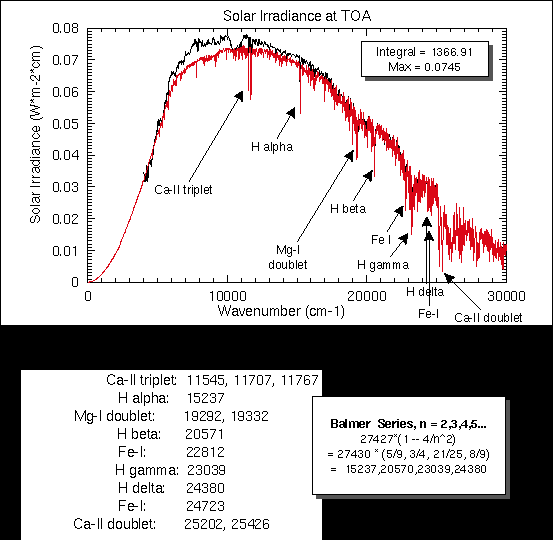
Solar irradiance spectrum at top of atmosphere, on a linear scale and plotted against wavenumber.

The Solar constant (denoted as S_{☉} by the IAU standard) is a mathematical equation averaging the amount of energy received by a given area one astronomical unit away from the Sun. To put it simply, it is measuring the amount of energy per second per square meter that arrives from the Sun at the distance of Earth's orbit. More specifically, it is a flux density measuring mean solar electromagnetic radiation (total solar irradiance) per unit area. It is measured on a surface perpendicular to the rays, one astronomical unit (au) from the Sun (roughly the distance from the Sun to the Earth).

The solar constant includes radiation over the entire electromagnetic spectrum. It is measured by satellite as being 1.361 kilowatts per square meter (kW/m^{2}) at solar minimum (the time in the 11-year solar cycle when the number of sunspots is minimal) and approximately 0.1% greater (roughly 1.362 kW/m^{2}) at solar maximum.

The solar "constant" is not a physical constant in the modern CODATA scientific sense; that is, it is not like the Planck constant or the speed of light which are absolutely constant in physics. The solar constant is an average of a varying value. In the past 400 years it has varied less than 0.2 percent. Billions of years ago, it was significantly lower. These differences in the amount of sunlight that the Earth receives accordingly affect atmospheric and oceanic processes.

This constant is used in the calculation of radiation pressure, which aids in the calculation of a force on a solar sail.

== Calculation ==
Solar irradiance is measured by satellites above Earth's atmosphere, and is then adjusted using the inverse square law to infer the magnitude of solar irradiance at one Astronomical Unit (au) to evaluate the solar constant. The approximate average value cited, 1.3608 ± 0.0005 kW/m^{2}, which is 81.65 kJ/m^{2} per minute, is equivalent to approximately 1.951 calories per minute per square centimeter, or 1.951 langleys per minute.

Solar output is nearly, but not quite, constant. Variations in total solar irradiance (TSI) were small and difficult to detect accurately with technology available before the satellite era (±2% in 1954). Total solar output is now measured as varying (over the last three 11-year sunspot cycles) by approximately 0.1%; see solar variation for details.

=== For extrasolar planets ===
$L=4\pi R_{\rm star}^2\sigma T_{\rm star}^4$
$L=4\pi f \ d ^2$
Therefore: $4\pi f\ d ^2 = 4\pi R_{\rm star}^2\sigma T_{\rm star}^4$
$$f = \frac{R_{\rm star}^2\sigma T_{\rm star}^4}{ d ^2}$$
Where $\sigma$ is the Stefan-Boltzmann constant (≈ 5.67×10^{−8} W⋅m^{−2}⋅K^{−4}) and f is the irradiance of the star at the extrasolar planet at distance d.

== Historical measurements ==
In 1838, Claude Pouillet made the first estimate of the solar constant. Using a very simple pyrheliometer he developed, he obtained a value of 1.228 kW/m^{2}, close to the current estimate.

In 1875, Jules Violle resumed the work of Pouillet and offered a somewhat larger estimate of 1.7 kW/m^{2} based, in part, on a measurement that he made from Mont Blanc in France.

In 1884, Samuel Pierpont Langley attempted to estimate the solar constant from Mount Whitney in California. By taking readings at different times of day, he tried to correct for effects due to atmospheric absorption. However, the final value he proposed, 2.903 kW/m^{2}, was much too large.

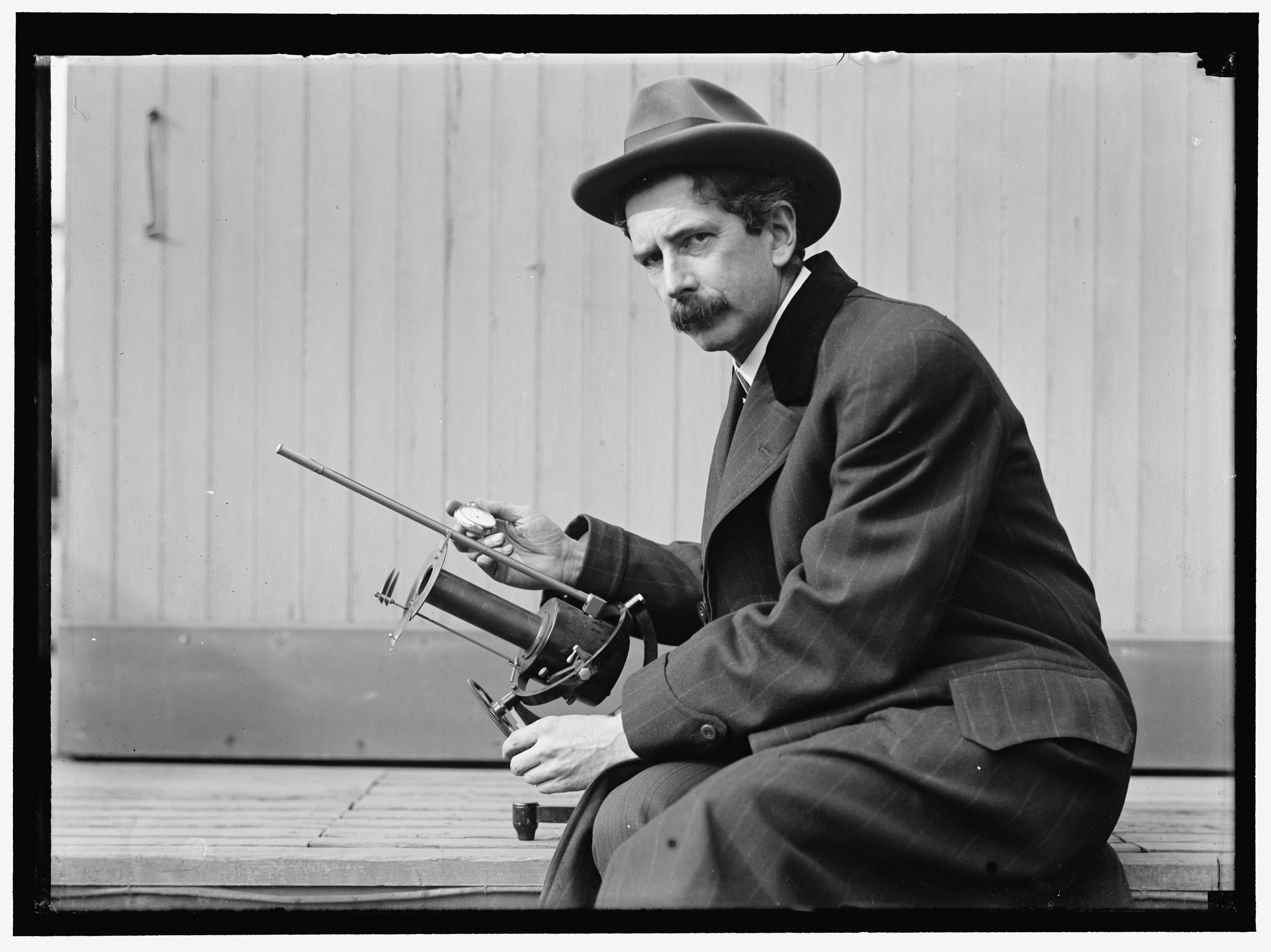
Charles Greeley

Between 1902 and 1957, measurements by Charles Greeley Abbot and others at various high-altitude sites found values between 1.322 and 1.465 kW/m^{2}. Abbot showed that one of Langley's corrections was erroneously applied. Abbot's results varied between 1.89 and 2.22 calories (1.318 to 1.548 kW/m^{2}), a variation that appeared to be due to the Sun and not the Earth's atmosphere.

In 1954 the solar constant was evaluated as 2.00 cal/min/cm^{2} ± 2%. Current results are about 2.5 percent lower.

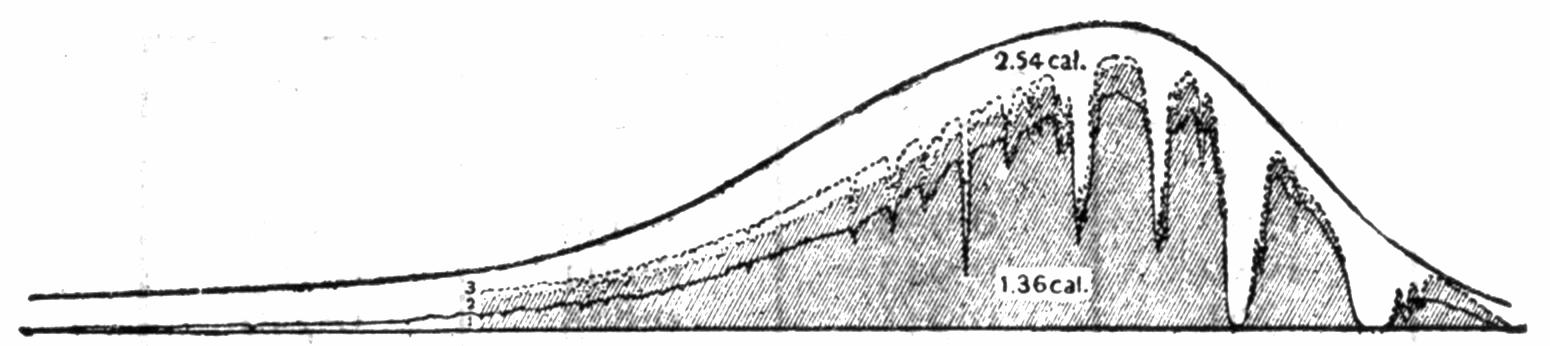
A 1903 Langley bolograph with an erroneous solar constant of 2.54 calories/minute/square centimeter.

== Relationship to other measurements ==
=== Solar irradiance ===
The actual direct solar irradiance at the top of the atmosphere fluctuates by about 6.9% during a year (from 1.408 kW/m^{2} in early January to 1.317 kW/m^{2} in early July) due to the Earth's varying distance from the Sun (The nominal solar luminosity defined by the International Astronomical Union is 3.828 10^{26} W), and typically by much less than 0.1% from day to day. It is assuming the earth was a perfect circle and stayed a constant distance from the sun. But, as we know, the earth moves during the year which is evidenced by having seasons. Thus, for the whole Earth (which has a cross section of 127,373,000 km^{2}), the power is 1.733×10^{17} W (or 173,329 terawatts), plus or minus 3.5% (or ±6,000 TW, i.e. half the approximately 6.9% annual range). The solar constant does not remain constant over long periods of time (see Solar variation), but over a year the solar constant varies much less than the solar irradiance measured at the top of the atmosphere. This is because the solar constant is evaluated at a fixed distance of 1 astronomical unit (au) while the solar irradiance will be affected by the eccentricity of the Earth's orbit. Its distance to the Sun varies annually between 147.1·10^{6} km at perihelion and 152.1·10^{6} km at aphelion. In addition, several long term (tens to hundreds of millennia) cycles of subtle variation in the Earth's orbit (Milankovich cycles) affect the solar irradiance and insolation (but not the solar constant).

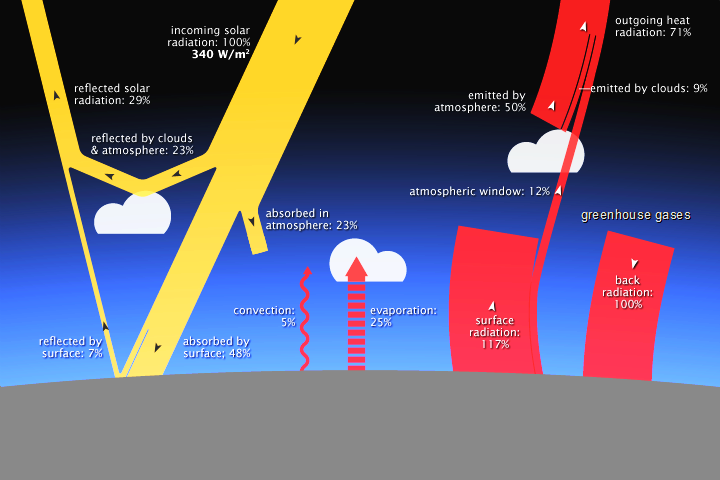

The Earth receives a total amount of radiation determined by its cross section (π·R_{E}^{2}), but as it rotates this energy is distributed across the entire surface area (4·π·R_{E}^{2}) (But the Earth is a flattened ellipsoid, and the factor is 4.0045). Hence the average incoming solar radiation, taking into account the angle at which the rays strike and that at any one moment half the planet does not receive any solar radiation, is one-fourth the solar constant (approximately 340 W/m^{2}). The amount reaching the Earth's surface (as insolation) is further reduced by atmospheric attenuation, which varies. At any given moment, the amount of solar radiation received at a location on the Earth's surface depends on the state of the atmosphere, the location's latitude, and the time of day.

=== Apparent magnitude ===
The solar constant includes all wavelengths of solar electromagnetic radiation, not just the visible light (see Electromagnetic spectrum). It is positively correlated with the apparent magnitude of the Sun which is −26.8. The solar constant and the magnitude of the Sun are two methods of describing the apparent brightness of the Sun, though the magnitude is based on the Sun's visual output only.

=== The Sun's total radiation ===
The angular diameter of the Earth as seen from the Sun is approximately 1/11,700 radians (about 18 arcseconds), meaning the solid angle of the Earth as seen from the Sun is approximately 1/175,000,000 of a steradian. Thus the Sun emits about 2.2 billion times the amount of radiation that is caught by Earth, in other words about 3.828×10^{26} watts, i.e. the nominal solar luminosity defined by the International Astronomical Union.

== Past variations in solar irradiance ==
Space-based observations of solar irradiance started in 1978. These measurements show that the solar constant is not constant. It varies with the 11-year sunspot solar cycle. When going further back in time, one has to rely on irradiance reconstructions, using sunspots for the past 400 years or cosmogenic radionuclides for going back 10,000 years. Such reconstructions show that solar irradiance varies with distinct periodicities. These cycles are: 11 years (Schwabe), 88 years (Gleisberg cycle), 208 years (DeVries cycle) and 1,000 years (Eddy cycle).

Over billions of years, the Sun is gradually expanding, and emitting more energy from the resultant larger surface area. The unsolved question of how to account for the clear geological evidence of liquid water on the Earth billions of years ago, at a time when the sun's luminosity was only 70% of its current value, is known as the faint young Sun paradox.

== Variations due to atmospheric conditions ==
At most about 75% of the solar energy actually reaches the earth's surface, as even with a cloudless sky it is partially reflected and absorbed by the atmosphere. Even light cirrus clouds reduce this to 50%, stronger cirrus clouds to 40%. Thus the solar energy arriving at the surface with the sun directly overhead can vary from 550 W/m^{2} with cirrus clouds to 1025 W/m^{2} with a clear sky.

== Nominal value ==
The solar constant is used in exoplanetology as a customary unit of irradiance of exoplanets as the direct comparison to the Earth is easy to grasp. In order to standardize the conversion into the SI units, the IAU 2015 Resolution B3 prescribes usage of nominal values of several solar and planetary quantities, including the value of the nominal total solar irradiance, which it defines as exactly 1361 W⋅m^{-2}. This value is independent of the actual value of the total solar irradiance, which varies with the solar cycle.

== See also ==
- Formation and evolution of the Solar System
- Irradiance
- List of solar cycles
- Radiation pressure
- Solar wind
- Stellar evolution
- Sun § Life phases
- Sunlight
