= Wendy Baltzer =

American veterinarian, small animal surgeon and academic

- Born: Wendy Irene Baltzer
- Occupations: Veterinarian and academic

Academic background
- Education: University of California, Davis
- Alma mater: Texas A&M University
- Thesis: The role of constrictor prostanoids in the development of aortic coarctation-induced hypertension in male and female rats (2003)

Academic work
- Institutions: Oregon State University; Massey University; University of Sydney

Wendy Irene Baltzer is an American veterinarian, small animal surgeon and academic.

== Academic career ==
Baltzer was educated at the University of California, Davis where she completed a Doctor of Veterinary Medicine in 1994. Following a PhD at Texas A&M University in 2003, she was employed as associate professor at Oregon State University where she specialised in small animal surgery from 2005 to 2016. She then moved to New Zealand to take up a position at Massey University where she was appointed full professor in November 2019, with effect from 1 January 2020. She practised at Massey's Working Dog Centre, focusing on sporting dogs' injuries, orthopaedics and rehabilitation.

In 2020 Baltzer transferred to the University of Sydney School of Veterinary Science, where she is associate professor as well as head of surgery at the University Veterinary Teaching Hospital Sydney.

== Selected works ==
- Baltzer, Wendy Irene; Rebecca Owen; Janis Bridges (2019). "Survey of Handlers of 158 Police Dogs in New Zealand: Functional Assessment and Canine Orthopedic Index". Frontiers in Veterinary Science. 6: 85. doi:10.3389/fvets.2019.00085. PMC 6478039. PMID 31058169. Wikidata Q64109086.
- Kopke, Matthew A.; Malcolm W Jack; Baltzer, Wendy Irene; Paul F Wightman; Arnon Gal (2019). "Dermoid sinus type VI associated with spina bifida and tethered cord syndrome in a French Bulldog". Journal of Veterinary Diagnostic Investigation. 31 (2): 294–297. doi:10.1177/1040638719827626. PMC 6838840. PMID 30734666. Wikidata Q91416672.
- Malcolm W Jack; Janelle R Wierenga; Janis P Bridges; Baltzer, Wendy Irene; Katherine R Crosse (2019). "Feasibility of open-chest cardiopulmonary resuscitation through a transdiaphragmatic approach in dogs". Veterinary Surgery. 48 (6): 1042–1049. doi:10.1111/vsu.13234. PMID 31120588. Wikidata Q64999094.
- Fiona J Coghill; Louisa K Ho-Eckart; Baltzer, Wendy Irene (2020). "Mid- to Long-Term Outcome after Arthroscopy and Proximal Abducting Ulnar Osteotomy Versus Arthroscopy Alone in Dogs with Medial Compartment Disease: Thirty Cases". Veterinary and Comparative Orthopaedics and Traumatology. 34 (02): 085–090. doi:10.1055/s-0040-1716843. PMID 33003225. Wikidata Q100409325.
