= Langley Aerodrome =

1898 aircraft by Samuel Langley

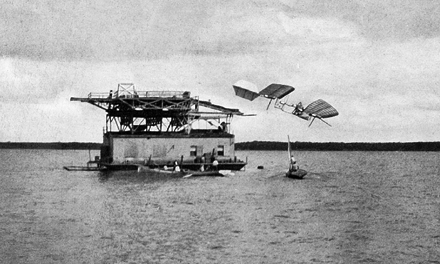
- First failure of the manned Aerodrome, October 7, 1903

General information
- Type: Experimental, pioneer fixed-wing aircraft
- National origin: United States
- Designer: Samuel Langley

The Langley Aerodrome is a pioneering but unsuccessful manned, tandem wing-configuration powered flying machine, designed at the close of the 19th century by Smithsonian Institution Secretary Samuel Langley (1834–1906). The U.S. Army paid $50,000 for the project in 1898 after Langley's successful flights with small-scale unmanned models two years earlier.

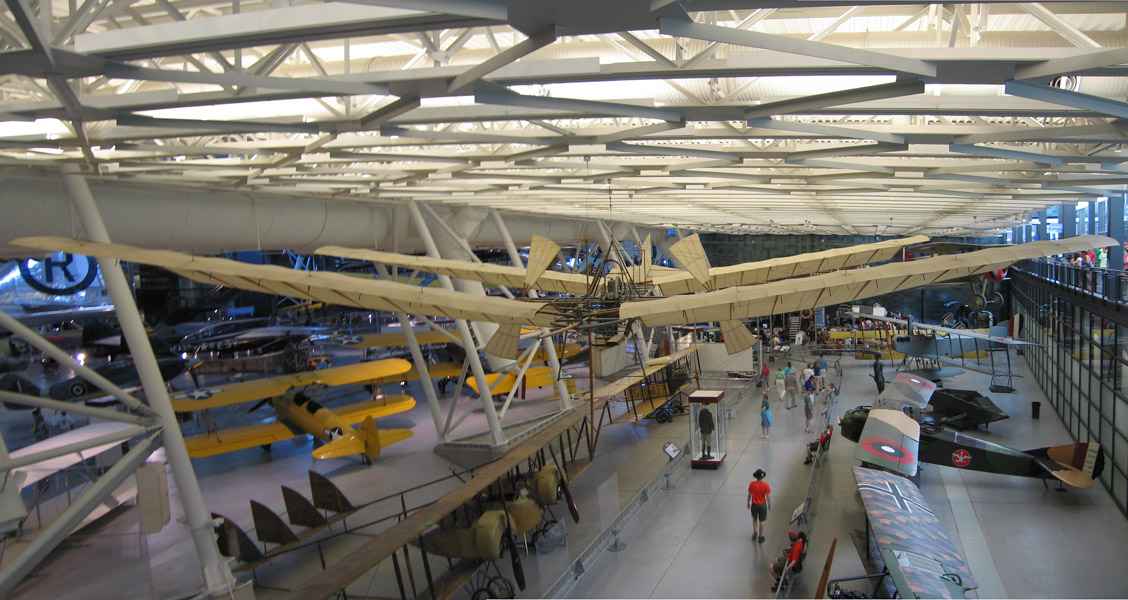
The man-carrying Aerodrome as displayed at the National Air and Space Museum's Steven F. Udvar-Hazy Center

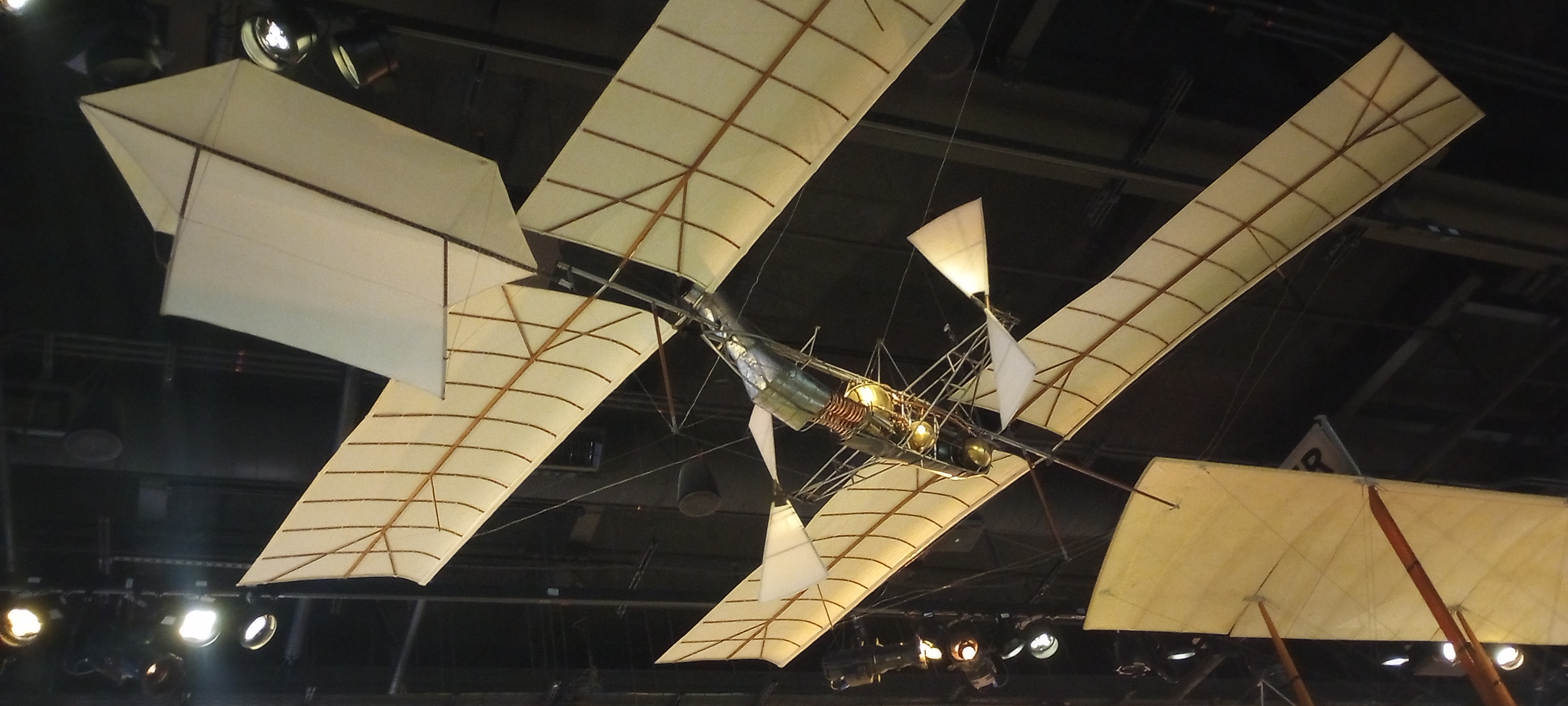
Langley Aerodrome no. 5, on display at the National Air and Space Museum, Washington DC.

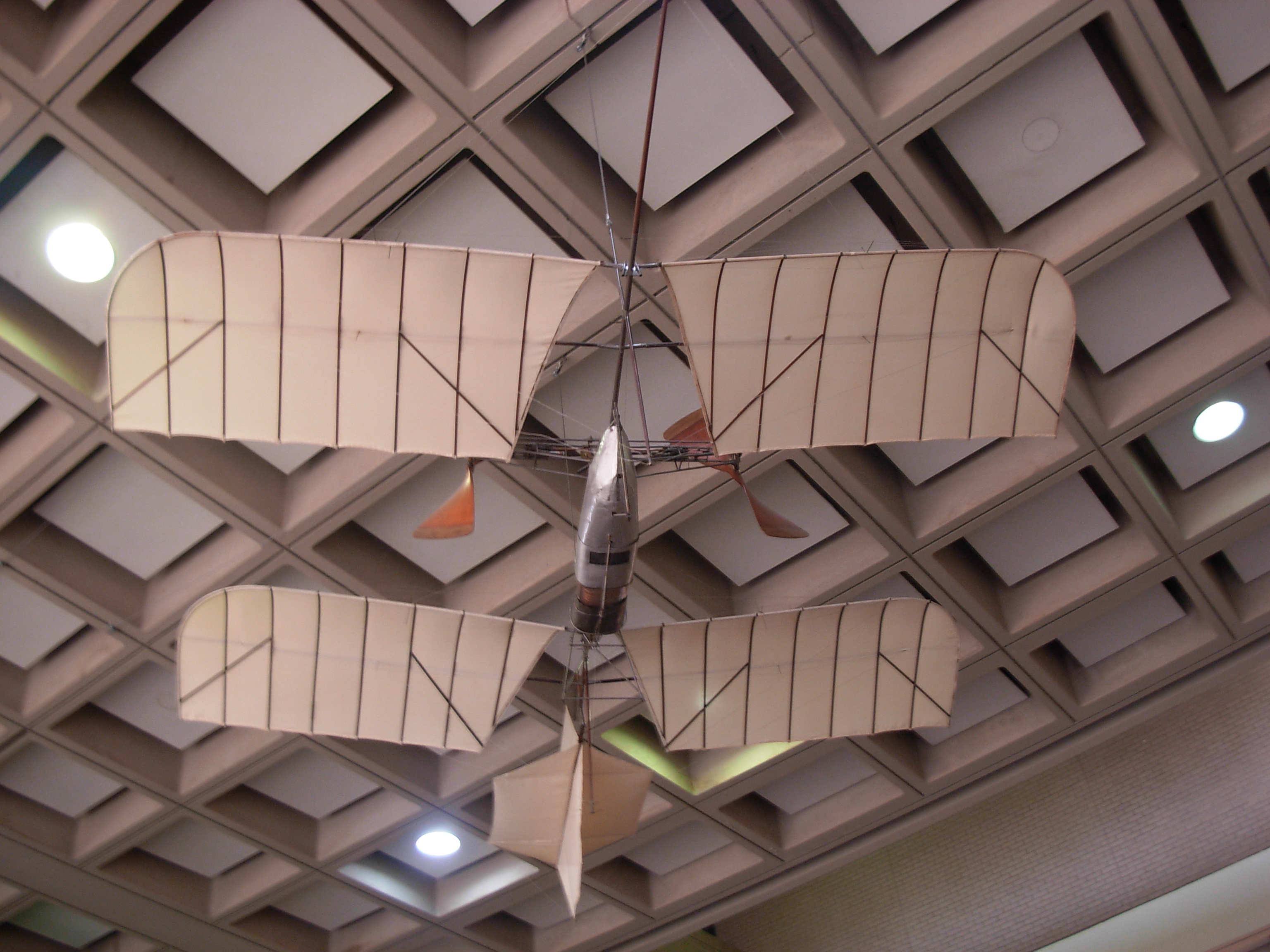
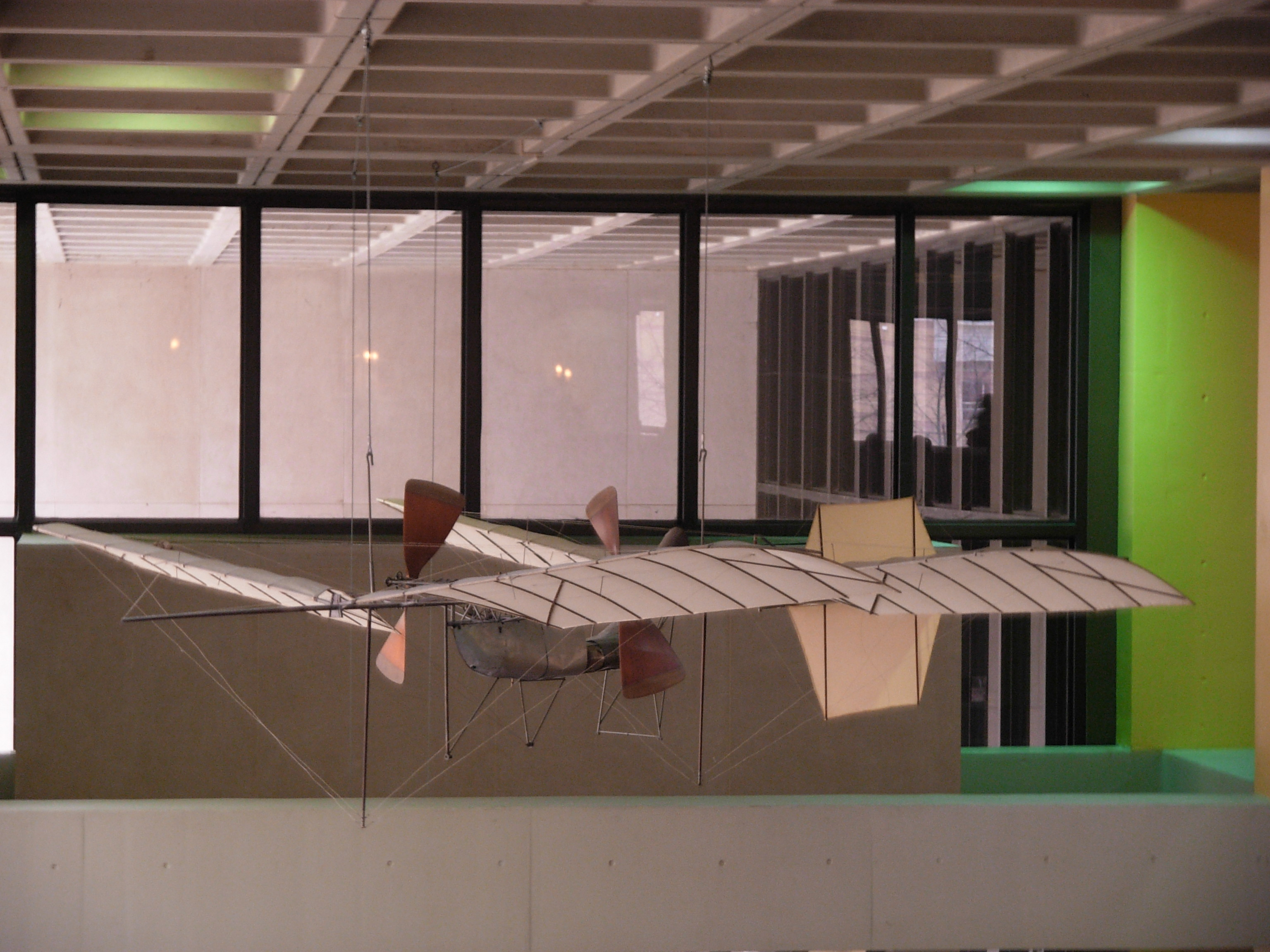
―
Langley Aerodrome No. 6 at Wesley W. Posvar Hall, University of Pittsburgh

== Design and development ==
Langley coined the name "Aerodrome" and applied it to a series of engine-driven unmanned and manned tandem wing aircraft that were built under his supervision by Smithsonian staff in the 1890s and early 1900s. The term is derived from Greek words meaning "air runner".

After a series of unsuccessful tests beginning in 1894, Langley's unmanned steam-driven model "Number 5" made a successful 90-second flight of over 0.5 miles (800 m) at about 25 miles per hour (40 km/h) at a height of 80 to 100 feet (24 to 30 m) on May 6, 1896. In November, model "Number 6" flew almost one mile (1.6 km). Both aircraft were launched by catapult from a houseboat in the Potomac River near Quantico, Virginia, south of Washington, D.C. The flights impressed Assistant Secretary of the Navy Theodore Roosevelt enough for him to assert that "the machine has worked" and to call for the United States Navy to create a four-officer board to study the utility of Langley's "flying machine" in March 1898, the first documented U.S. Navy expression of interest in aviation. The group approved the idea, although the Navy did not take on the project. Instead, the Board of Ordnance and Fortification of the U.S. Department of War acted on the recommendation and made $50,000 in grants to the Smithsonian for construction of a full-scale man-carrying version. Langley's technical team also built a gasoline-powered quarter-scale unmanned model, which flew successfully twice on June 18, 1901, and again with an improved engine on August 8, 1903.

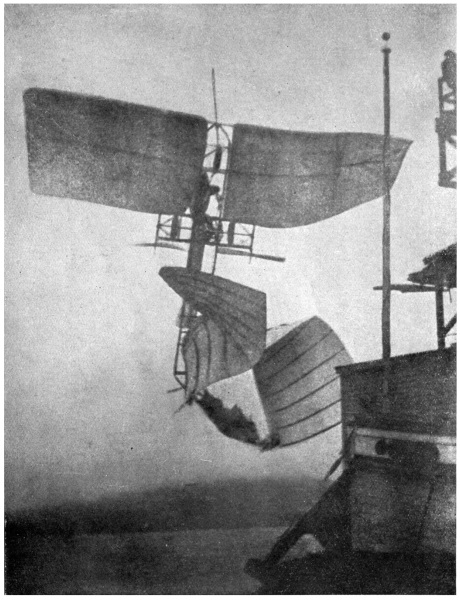
The second failure of the manned Aerodrome, December 8, 1903, as it collapses on launch.

The full-scale Aerodrome's internal combustion engine generated 53 horsepower, about four times that of the Wright brothers' gasoline engine of 1903. The Aerodrome's other features, however, especially structure and control, left much to be desired. The Aerodrome had a primitive control system that included a cruciform tail and a centrally mounted rudder. Langley again used a houseboat catapult for launch. He chose his chief engineer, Charles M. Manly, to ride the aircraft and operate the controls as best he might. On the first flight attempt, October 7, 1903, the craft failed to fly and dropped into the Potomac River immediately after launch. On the second attempt, December 8, the craft collapsed after launch and again fell into the river. Rescuers pulled Manly unhurt from the water each time. Langley blamed the calamities on a problem with the launch mechanism, not the aircraft. The real problem lay in his failure to consider the problems of calculating stress on an airframe and correct control of an aircraft. He made no further tests, and his experiments became the object of scorn in newspapers and the U.S. Congress.

Nine days after the December 8, 1903, failure, the Wright brothers conducted four successful flights near Kitty Hawk, North Carolina.

== 1914 modification and flight tests ==
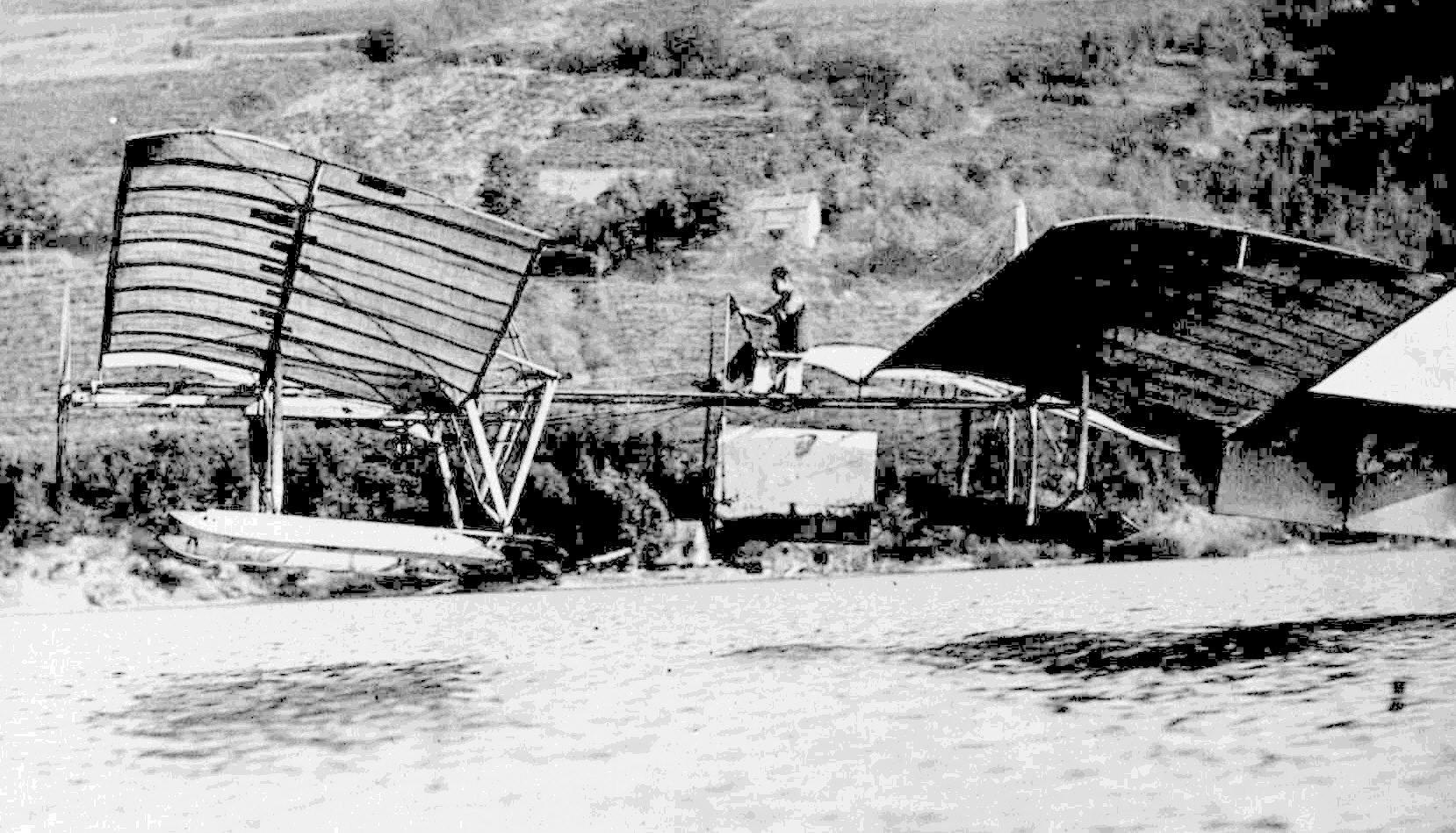
William E. "Gink" Doherty coaxes the structurally modified Langley Aerodrome into the air above the surface of Keuka Lake near Hammondsport, New York in 1914.

At the Smithsonian's instigation, Glenn Curtiss extensively modified the Aerodrome in an attempt to bypass the Wright brothers' patent on aircraft and to vindicate Langley. He reduced the wing area and aspect ratio and strengthened its structure, and modified the tail to act in the conventional way. He also upgraded the power train, replacing the ignition and cooling systems and fitting new propellers designed after the Wright pattern. Finally, he added floats to operate from the water surface and lowered the centre of mass by about 1 foot (0.30 m). Curtiss flew the modified Aerodrome from Keuka Lake, New York, hopping a few feet off the surface of the water several times for no longer than five seconds at a time. Photos of a bit of daylight beneath the pontoons taken at an additional test conducted closer to shore a few days later were published by the media.

Based on these flights, the Smithsonian displayed the Aerodrome in its museum as the first heavier-than-air manned, powered aircraft "capable of flight." The attempt at deception misfired. Their action triggered a feud with Orville Wright (Wilbur Wright had died in 1912), who accused the Smithsonian of misrepresenting flying machine history. Orville backed up his protest by refusing to donate the original 1903 Wright Flyer to the Smithsonian, instead loaning it to the extensive collections of the Science Museum of London in 1928. The dispute finally ended in 1942 when the Smithsonian published details of the Curtiss modifications to the Aerodrome and recanted its claims for the aircraft.

Curtiss called the preparations "restoration" claiming that the only addition to the design was pontoons to support testing on the lake, but critics, including patent attorney Griffith Brewer, called them alterations of the original design. In a June 22, 1914, letter to The New York Times, Brewer asked "Why, if the Langley flying machine was a practical flying machine, did not those in charge of the machine try to fly it without alteration?" Brewer also questioned the decision to allow someone who had been found guilty of patent infringement to be chosen to prepare the historic aircraft for tests.

== Preservation ==
Two of Langley's scale model Aerodromes survive to this day. Aerodrome No. 5, the first Langley heavier-than-air craft to fly, is on display at the Smithsonian's National Air and Space Museum in Washington, D.C. Aerodrome No. 6 is located at Wesley W. Posvar Hall, University of Pittsburgh, and was restored in part by the engineering students. Fabric on the wings and tail is the only new material, although the tail and several wing ribs were rebuilt using vintage wood from the same time period, provided by the Smithsonian. Langley had been an astronomy professor at the university before he ascended to the Smithsonian's top job.

The man-carrying Aerodrome survived after being rebuilt and tested by Curtiss and was converted back to Langley's original 1903 configuration by Smithsonian staff. It occupied a place of honor in the Smithsonian museum until 1948 when the Institution welcomed home the original 1903 Wright Flyer from the U.K. Afterward, the Aerodrome resided out of view of the public for many years at the Paul Garber Facility in Suitland, Maryland. Today it is displayed at the National Air and Space Museum's Steven F. Udvar-Hazy Center in Chantilly, Virginia

== See also ==
- History of aviation
- Manly–Balzer engine
- Wright Flyer § Debate with the Smithsonian
