= Langley Gold Medal =

Scientific award

The Langley Gold Medal, or Samuel P. Langley Medal for Aerodromics, is an award given by the Smithsonian Institution for outstanding contributions to the sciences of aeronautics and astronautics. Named in honor of Samuel P. Langley, the Smithsonian's third Secretary, it was authorized by the Board of Regents in 1909.

The medal was suggested by Alexander Graham Bell. It is awarded for "meritorious investigations in connection with the science of aerodromics and its application to aviation".

== List of award winners ==
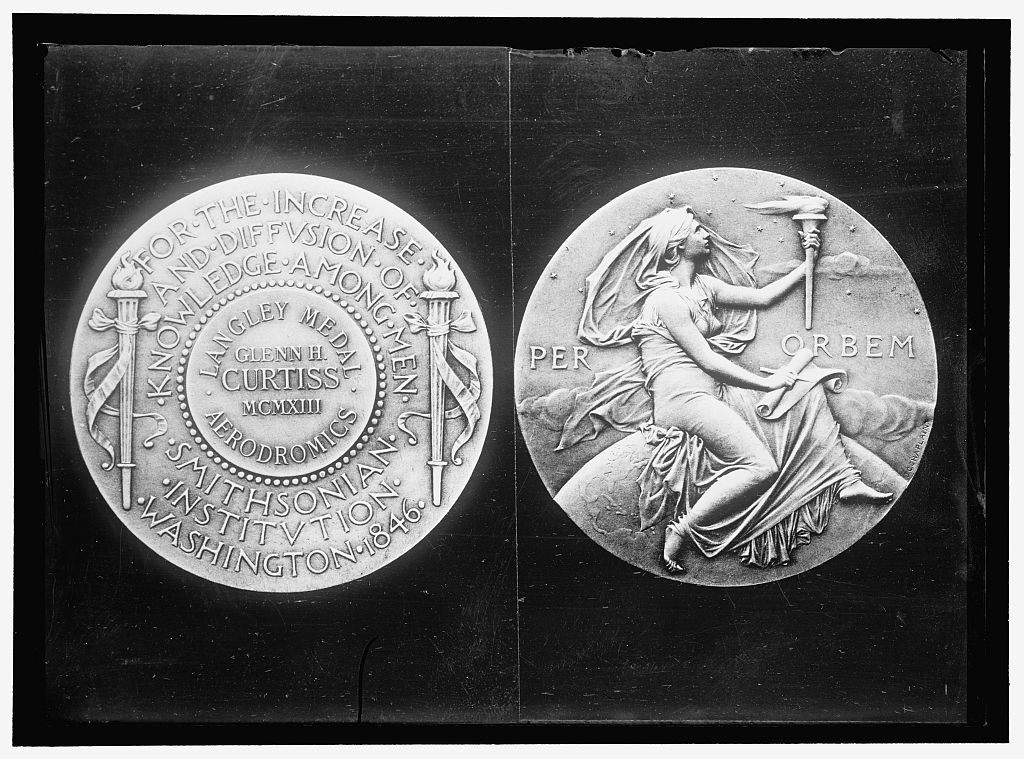
Face and obverse of the 1913 Langley Medal awarded to Glenn Hammond Curtiss

(Reference unless given individually)

- 1910 Orville and Wilbur Wright
- 1913 Glenn Curtiss, Gustave Eiffel
- 1927 Charles Lindbergh
- 1929 Charles M. Manly (posthumously awarded), Richard E. Byrd
- 1935 Joseph S. Ames
- 1955 Jerome Clarke Hunsaker
- 1960 Robert H. Goddard (posthumously awarded)
- 1962 Hugh Latimer Dryden
- 1964 Alan Shepard
- 1967 Wernher von Braun
- 1971 Samuel C. Phillips
- 1976 James E. Webb
- 1976 Grover Loening
- 1981 Charles Stark Draper
- 1981 Robert T. Jones
- 1983 Ross Perot, Jr. and Jay Coburn
- 1987 Barry Goldwater
- 1992 Benjamin O. Davis, Jr.
- 1999 Neil Armstrong, Buzz Aldrin and Michael Collins

== See also ==
- List of aviation awards
