= Langley (unit) =

langley
- Unit system: Non-SI metric unit
- Unit of: Heat flux
- Symbol: Ly
- Named after: Samuel Langley
- Derivation: 1 cal_{th}/cm^{2}

Conversions
1 Ly in ...	... is equal to ...
- SI units: 41 840 J/m^{2}

The langley (Ly) is a unit of heat transmission, especially used to express the rate of solar radiation (or insolation) received by the earth. The unit was proposed by Franz Linke in 1942 and named after Samuel Langley (1834–1906) in 1947.

== Definition ==
One langley is

- 1 thermochemical calorie per square centimetre,
- 41 840 J/m^{2} (joules per square metre)

== See also ==
- Solar constant
- Radiant exposure
