= Balzer =

Balzer is a surname. Notable people with the surname include:

- Arthur J. Balzer (1895–1962), American merchant
- Falk Balzer (born 1973), German athlete
- Félix Balzer (1849–1929), French physician
- George Balzer (1915–2006), American screenwriter
- Johann Balzer (1738–1799), Czech engraver
- Karin Balzer (1938–2019), East German athlete
- Oswald Balzer (1858–1933), Polish historian
- Robert Lawrence Balzer (1912–2011), American wine journalist
- Roma Balzer (born 1954), New Zealand community worker
- Stephen M. Balzer (c. 1864–1940) Hungarian-American mechanic and inventor

== Other ==
- Balzer Jacobsen, Prime Minister of the Faroe Islands
- Balzer, original name of the town of Krasnoarmeysk, Saratov Oblast, Russia
- Balzer (automobile), American automobile manufacturer

== See also ==
- Balzers, a village in Liechtenstein
