= Journal of Veterinary Diagnostic Investigation =

- Discipline: Veterinary medicine
- Language: English
- Edited by: Grant Maxie

Publication details
- History: 1989–present
- Publisher: SAGE Publications
- Frequency: Bi-monthly
- Impact factor: 1.5 (2022)

Standard abbreviations
- ISO 4: J. Vet. Diagn. Investig.
- NLM: J Vet Diagn Invest

Indexing
- ISSN: 1040-6387 (print); 1943-4936 (web)
- LCCN: 88089915
- OCLC no.: 609938742

Links
- Journal homepage; Online access; Online archive

The Journal of Veterinary Diagnostic Investigation is an international peer-reviewed academic journal published bimonthly in English that publishes papers in the field of Veterinary Sciences. The journal's editor is Grant Maxie. The Journal has been in publication since 1989 and is currently published by SAGE Publications in association with American Association of Veterinary Laboratory Diagnosticians, Inc.

== Scope ==
JVDI is devoted to all aspects of veterinary laboratory diagnostic science including the major disciplines of anatomic pathology, bacteriology/mycology, clinical pathology, epidemiology, immunology, laboratory information management, molecular biology, parasitology, public health, toxicology, and virology.

== Abstracting and indexing ==
The Journal of Veterinary Diagnostic Investigation is abstracted and indexed in, among other databases: SCOPUS, PubMed/Medline, and the Social Sciences Citation Index. According to the Journal Citation Reports, its 2022 impact factor is 1.5, ranking it 65 out of 144 journals in the category Veterinary Sciences.

== About the journal ==
Three manuscript formats are accepted for review: Review Articles, Full Scientific Reports, and Brief Communications. Review articles are strongly encouraged provided they cover subjects of current and broad interest to veterinary laboratory diagnosticians.

JVDI also publishes position announcements for employment and advertisements for diagnostic products. JVDI content is open access after a 12-month embargo. This journal is a member of the Committee on Publication Ethics (COPE)
