= Stephen M. Balzer =

Hungarian-American inventor

Stephen Marius Balzer (c. 1864 – September 29, 1940) was a Hungarian-born American mechanic and inventor. He was the founder of the Balzer Motor Company and later donated one of his cars to the Smithsonian Institution, which was the first car in its collection. An engine he created for pioneering aviator Samuel Pierpont Langley was heavily modified and used in a craft that has been considered one of the earliest heavier-than-air aircraft.

Born c. 1864, Balzer immigrated in the 1870s from the Kingdom of Hungary to the United States. He apprenticed as a watchmaker at Tiffany & Co. When he started his own business in 1894, a machine shop, he already held several patents for mechanical devices, among them a device for making milling cutters and his rotary engine. In the same year, he completed his first prototype automobile, a motorized quadricycle with a tube chassis, less than 3 by 6 feet (0.91 by 1.83 m). It had a rotary, air-cooled, 3-cylinder engine, mounted vertically in the rear and revolving around a fixed crankshaft. Turning with the crank case was a stub shaft. It further had a three-speed manual transmission with no reverse. One lever engaged speeds and clutch. Each front wheel had its own bicycle fork axle which were connected by a bar which was operated by a tiller.) By 1897, he had built three cars. Balzer would later recount that he was required by an officer of the New York Police Department to have one of his early test-model cars, which could be driven at a maximum speed of no more than 4 miles per hour (6.4 km/h), accompanied by someone walking in front of the car waving a red flag.

On May 16, 1899, Balzer donated his prototype to the Smithsonian Institution, the first automobile in its collection. It is currently in collection.

He developed also 5-cylinder rotary engines. When Smithsonian Institution Secretary Samuel Pierpont Langley learned about these vehicles and their engine in 1898, he contacted Balzer, ordering one for his experimental airplane. Balzer had challenges completing this engine, delivering finally not earlier than 1900. For proper use, Langley's technical assistant, Charles M. Manly had to modify it heavily. The engine became known as the Manly–Balzer engine, the first purpose-built airplane engine, with credit largely given to Manly, who was later awarded a medal for his innovations on the engine by the United States Congress.

His business was not very successful, and he left in 1902, still working as a mechanic.

He moved to Andover, New Jersey, where he died in 1940 at the age of 78.
