= Manly–Balzer engine =

1900s American piston aircraft engine

Manly–Balzer
- Type: 5-cylinder water-cooled radial engine
- National origin: United States
- First run: 1903
- Major applications: Langley Aerodrome

The Manly–Balzer was the first purpose-designed aircraft engine, built in 1901 for the Langley Aerodrome project. The engine was originally ordered from Stephen Balzer (1864–1940) in New York, but his five-cylinder radial engine design failed to live up to its claims. Langley's chief assistant, Charles Manly, then reworked the engine to produce a design that held the record for power-to-weight ratio for any engine for many years. Manly later worked for Glenn Curtiss, and was one of the team-members who designed the mass-produced Curtiss OX-5.

== Background ==
The problem with powering the Aerodrome had been known as early as 1898 when work on the person-carrying versions first started. At the time the gasoline engine was a fairly new invention, and no engine in the world had the needed performance. After a short search they decided to contract the development to one of the few engine builders in the area, New York's Stephen M. Balzer.

Balzer was a Hungarian immigrant who had a mechanical bent and started designing various devices while working in the watch repair department in Tiffany's. He followed this with a night course in engineering, and struck out on his own to develop what would become New York's first car in 1894, a small four-wheel carriage powered by a three-cylinder rotary engine of his design. Balzer was convinced he could build an engine to Langley's requirements by scaling up his existing design into a larger five-cylinder one. Langley gave him a contract in December 1898, and work started on the new design.

== Engine development ==
The engine was completed fairly quickly, but proved to be underpowered, delivering 8–10 hp (6–7 kW) compared to the 12 hp (9 kW) Langley wanted. As would be rediscovered by many engineers after him, Balzer found that scaling up his existing design simply didn't work. Manly worked with him to try to improve the design, but by 1899 it was clear that it wasn't going to work any time soon. Balzer never gave up on the engine, and continued to work on it for years, eventually going bankrupt.

Every engineer Manly met on a trip to Europe in 1900 told him the rotary design was hopeless. Manly eventually became convinced as well and started work on adapting one of the existing Balzer engines into a non-rotating radial engine. The main concern was cooling, which he solved by welding a jacket to each cylinder and filling it with water. The results were promising, and the engine was soon delivering 12–16 hp (9–12 kW), double its previous output. This version was soon in place on a 1/4-scale model of the "Great Aerodrome", which flew successfully in 1901.

Encouraged by this success, Manly started scaling up the engine with larger cylinders and new lightweight pistons. The resulting design weighed 120 lb (54 kg), and delivered 52 hp (39 kW), making it by far the most powerful lightweight engine of its era, far outperforming the one that would eventually be successful on the Wright Flyer. The engine was delivered in March 1903 and installed on the Aerodrome for testing that summer. In September the aircraft was moved to a launch platform on a houseboat in the Potomac River. With Manly aboard as pilot, the Aerodrome crashed in spectacular fashion in its first test on October 7. Langley had also fallen prey to the "scale it up" problem, and the full-sized model of what was a sturdy 1/4-scale model was hopelessly fragile. A second test also ended in a crash into the river on December 8. Manly survived both times.

In 1914 Glenn Curtiss used the engine in the heavily modified Aerodrome in an effort to break the Wright brothers aircraft control system patent. In additional flight tests the Curtiss team used a different and more modern engine.

Years later the Smithsonian Institution asked Manly for a monograph about the engine, and he wrote an account that significantly downplayed Balzer's contribution, reducing it to supplying a non-working design that he rebuilt. Balzer's family was upset, and the Smithsonian eventually wrote a much more balanced version.

== Specifications ==
=== General characteristics ===
- Type: 5-cylinder water-cooled one-row radial engine
- Bore: 5.0 in (127 mm)
- Stroke: 5.5 in (140 mm)
- Displacement: 540 in³ (8.85 L)
- Dry weight: 136 lb (62 kg)

=== Components ===
- Cooling system: Water-cooled

=== Performance ===
- Power output: 52 hp (39 kW) at 950 rpm
- Specific power: 0.10 hp/in³ (4.4 kW/L)
- Power-to-weight ratio: 0.38 hp/lb (0.63 kW/kg)
