= Charles M. Manly =

American engineer and flight pioneer (1876–1927)

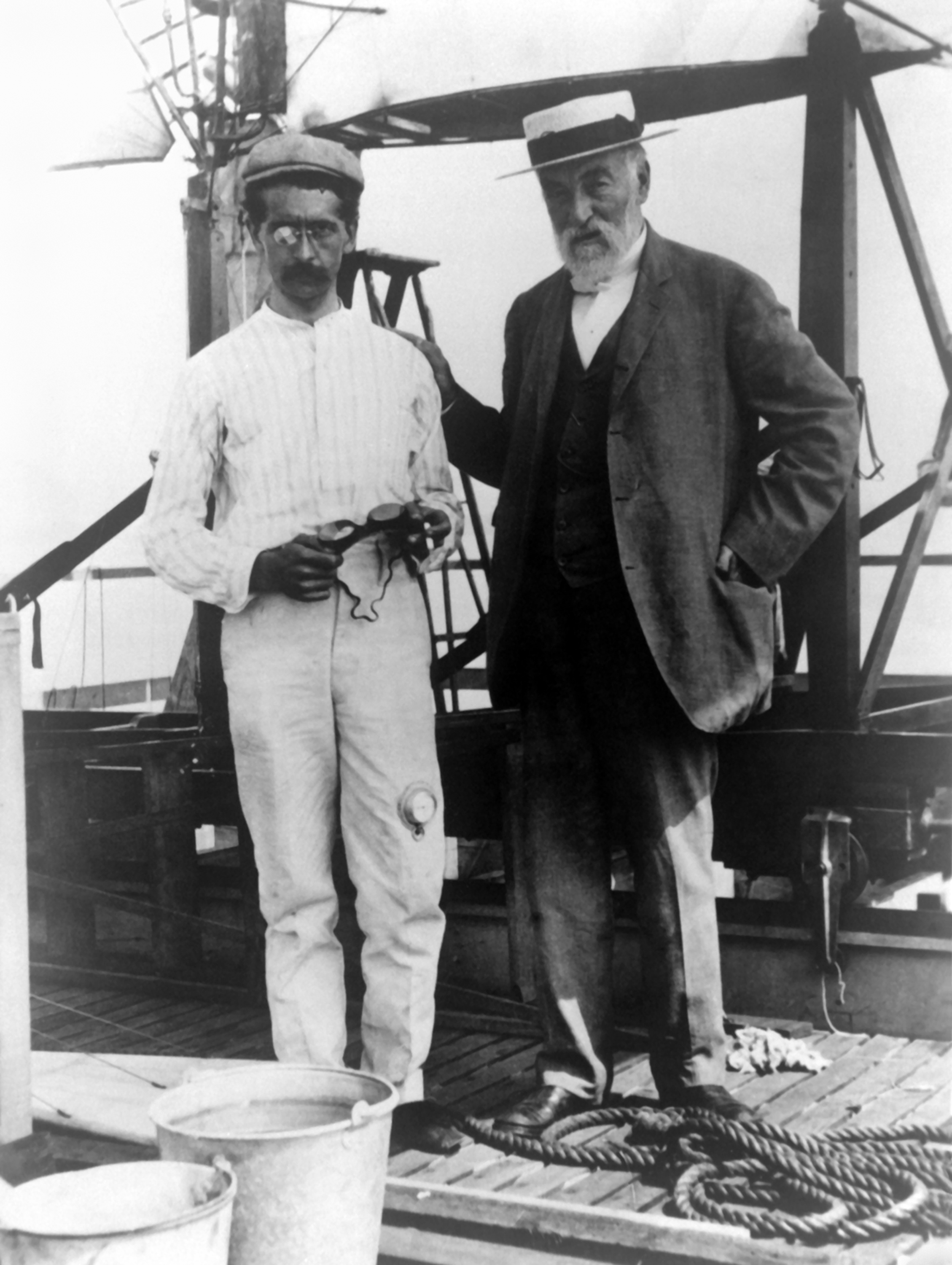
- Charles Manly and Samuel Langley.
- Born: April 26, 1876; Staunton, Virginia, US
- Died: October 16, 1927 (aged 51); Brooklyn, New York, US
- Education: Cornell University
- Occupation: Mechanical engineer
- Known for: Langley Aerodrome
- Spouse: Grace Agnes Wishart (1877–1921) (her death)
- Children: 2

Charles Matthews Manly (1876–1927) was an American engineer.

Manly helped Smithsonian Institution Secretary Samuel Pierpont Langley build The Great Aerodrome, which was intended to be a manned, powered, winged flying machine. Manly made major contributions to the development of the aircraft's revolutionary 52 hp gasoline-fueled radial engine, called the Manly–Balzer engine. Manly attempted to pilot the Aerodrome in its only two tests, in October and December 1903. The machine failed to fly both times, plunging into the Potomac River after its launch from a houseboat. Manly was rescued unhurt, although he was briefly trapped underwater after the second test.

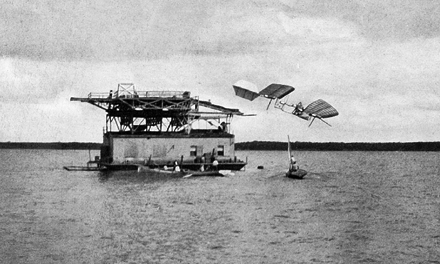
The Great Aerodrome failed in its first test, October 7, 1903.

During World War I Manly was an advisor to the British War Office. He also earned about 40 patents in variable-speed hydraulic drives.

From 1915 to 1919 he was a consulting engineer to the Curtiss Aeroplane and Motor Company.

In 1919 he was named president of the Society of Automotive Engineers (now SAE International). Following his tenure he did additional engineering research on engines. The Manly Memorial Medal is an annual award given by SAE for the best paper on aeronautical power plants.

Manly married his wife Grace Agnes Wishart Manly (1877–1921) in 1904. He died at Kew Gardens, Brooklyn, NY on October 16, 1927, leaving two sons, Charles and John.

He was a 1929 posthumous recipient of the Langley Gold Medal from the Smithsonian Institution.
