= Heinrich Beck Halle =

Arena

Heinrich Beck Halle is an arena in Leutershausen, Germany, primarily used for team handball. Its capacity is 1,200 people.
