= Whitehead No. 21 =

Aircraft built and supposedly flown by Gustave Whitehead in Bridgeport, CT in 1901

No.21
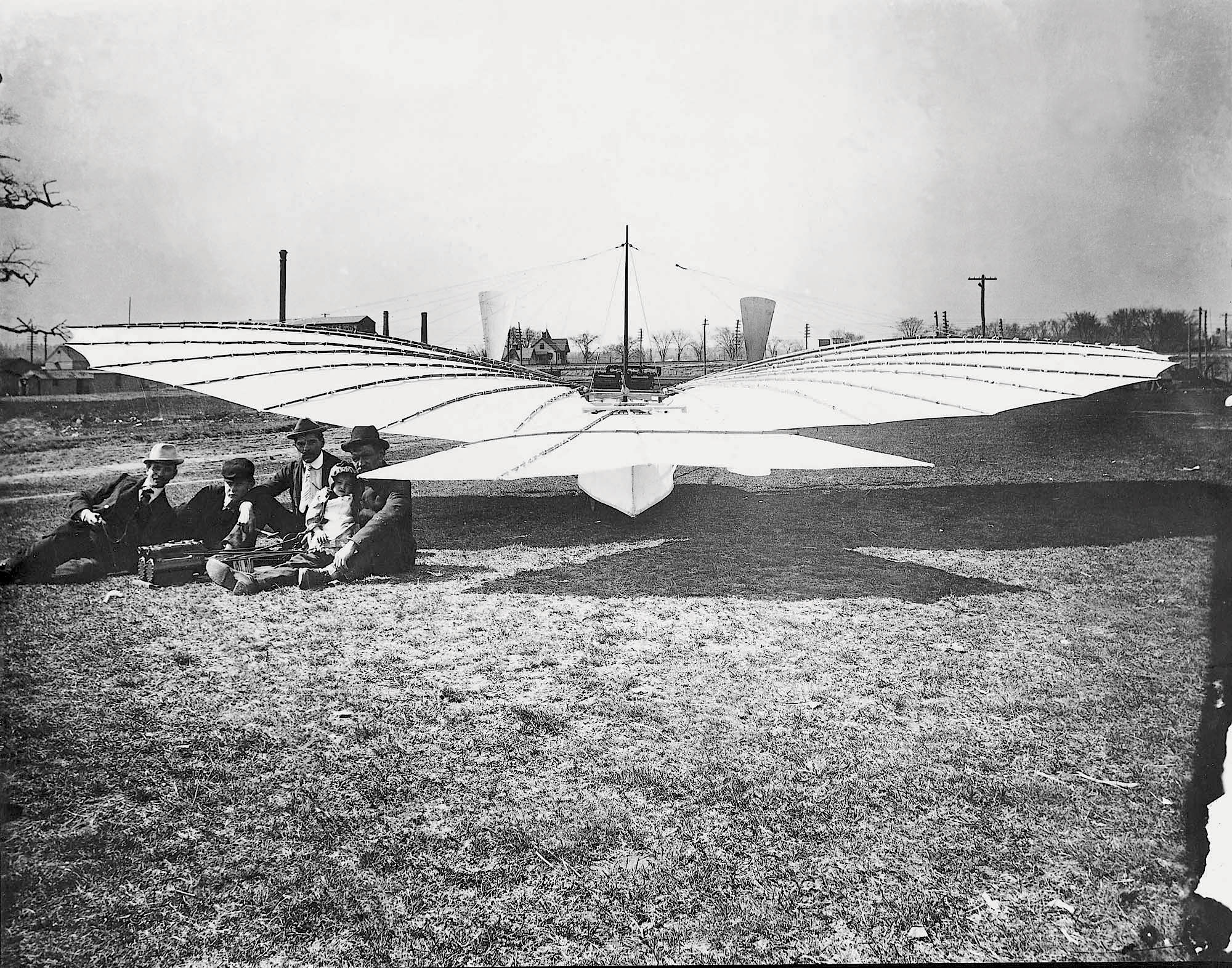
- Gustave Whitehead and his 1901 monoplane taken near Whitehead's Pine Street shop. His infant daughter, Rose, sits on her father's lap, and the engine that powers the front landing-gear wheels is on the ground in front of the others.

General information
- Type: experimental
- Manufacturer: Gustave Whitehead
- Designer: Gustave Whitehead
- Primary user: Gustave Whitehead
- Number built: 1

History
- Manufactured: 1901
- First flight: purportedly August 14, 1901

The Whitehead No.21 was the aircraft that aviation pioneer Gustave Whitehead claimed to have flown near Bridgeport, Connecticut on August 14, 1901. Professional aviation historians and scholars reject claims for the flight. A description and photographs of Whitehead's aircraft appeared in Scientific American in June 1901, stating that the "novel flying machine" had just been completed, and "is now ready for preliminary trials". The flight was reported in the August 18, 1901, issue of the Bridgeport Sunday Herald and reprints or rewrites were published in many other newspapers.

Photographs exist showing the aircraft on the ground, but there are no photographs known of the aircraft in flight. The No.21 was a monoplane powered by two engines—one for the wheels during the ground run, the other for driving the propellers in flight.

== Design and construction ==
The No. 21 was a wire-braced monoplane with bat-like wings and triangular horizontal tail. There was no vertical fin, and lateral control was intended to be accomplished by shifting the pilot's body sideways.

The wings were constructed with radial bamboo ribs and covered with silk, and had a span of 36 ft (11 m). They had some dihedral when opened out to the flying position.

The fuselage was of rectangular box section with constant height, curved to taper inwards at front and rear when seen from above. Four small wheels were fixed to the bottom.

An analysis in 1980 concluded that the design as a whole was flimsy and aerodynamically unsound.

Although it had two engines and twin propellers, the aircraft was not a conventional twin. It had separate engines for ground running and flight, both designed and made by Whitehead. The ground engine was of 10 hp (7.5 kW) and drove the wheels to reach takeoff speed. Propulsion was then changed to a 20 hp (15 kW) acetylene engine driving two counter-rotating tractor propellers mounted on outriggers. The aircraft was intended to take off under its own power and without assistance.

A description and photographs of Whitehead's aircraft appeared in Scientific American in June 1901, stating that the "novel flying machine" had just been completed, and "is now ready for preliminary trials." The article included photographs showing the aircraft on the ground.

== Claims of flight ==
A minority of commentators claim that the No. 21 flew, but the majority of historians reject these claims.

Whitehead was quoted in a July 26 article in the Minneapolis Journal, credited to the New York Sun, in which he described the first two trial flights of his machine on May 3. Andrew Cellie and Daniel Varovi were mentioned as his financial backers who also assisted in the trial flights. The machine was unmanned and carried 220 pounds (100 kilograms) of sand as ballast and flew to an altitude of 40 to 50 feet (12 to 15 m) for 1/8 of a mile (200 m). According to Whitehead, the machine flew a distance of 1/2 mile (790 m) during its second test flight for one and one-half minutes before crashing into a tree. He also explained his desire to keep the location of any future experiments hidden to avoid drawing a crowd who might make a "snap-shot verdict of failure".

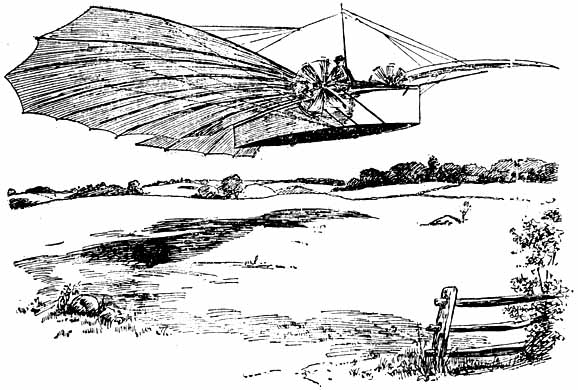
Drawing in the Bridgeport Herald of No.21 aloft.

In an article in the August 18, 1901, issue of the Bridgeport Sunday Herald a reporter states that he witnessed a night test of the machine, at first unpiloted and loaded with sandbags, and later with Whitehead at the controls. The story was reprinted in the New York Herald, the Boston Transcript and the Washington Times, which ran it on August 23, 1901. Within months, the story ran in nine other newspapers in all parts of the country, as far away as California and Arizona. A drawing of the aircraft in flight accompanied the Sunday Herald article.

According to Whitehead and a reporter who claimed to have witnessed the event, the monoplane's longest flight was 200 feet (61 m) above ground for one-half mile (0.80 km).

Whitehead's supporters say that he made four flights that day, which resulted in conflicting accounts from different witnesses. The conflicts have been used by opponents of the claims to question whether any flights took place.

These claims are rejected by mainstream historians. Whitehead did not keep a logbook or document his work. In 1980 aviation historian C. H. Gibbs-Smith called the story a "flight of fancy".

A minority of commentators have supported Whitehead's claim to have flown the No. 21 and this has caused some controversy. In 2013 an editorial by Paul Jackson in the influential industry publication Jane's All the World's Aircraft credited Whitehead as the first man to build and fly a powered heavier-than-air flying machine. The corporate owner of Jane's subsequently distanced itself from the editorial, stating "the article reflected Mr. Jackson's opinion on the issue and not that of IHS Jane's". Tom Crouch, senior curator of aeronautics for the National Air and Space Museum (NASM) of the Smithsonian Institution, studied evidence for the alleged flight and in 2016 he issued a strong rebuttal, noting many other authorities who had already done so.

== Replicas ==
Two replicas have been flown. They both introduced modern technologies and do not inform as to whether the original might have been capable of flight.

In 1986 American Andrew Kosch, a local high school teacher and hang glider pilot, led a team which built a replica of Whitehead's No. 21. The replica used two modern ultralight aircraft engines in place of the original steam and acetylene engines, and the landing gear track was increased for better ground handling. Initially, actor Cliff Robertson piloted the replica while under tow behind a sports car. On December 29, 1986, Kosch made several flights in the replica, reporting that he flew 100 m (330 ft).

A second replica was built in Germany, using modern research and materials, such as fibreglass, and with a modern engine. On February 18, 1998, it was flown 500 m (1,600 ft).

== See also ==
- Gustave Whitehead
- Claims to the first powered flight
