= Boston Aeronautical Society =

American organization founded in 1895

- Formation: March 19, 1895; 131 years ago
- Location: Boston, Massachusetts
- Key people: James Means; Albert A. Merrill; William H. Pickering; Gustave Whitehead
- Affiliations: New Haven Aeronautical Society; New York Aeronautical Society

The Boston Aeronautical Society was founded by James Means, Albert A. Merrill, and William H. Pickering on March 19, 1895. In 1896, the Boston Aeronautical Society developed an "experiment fund" and accepted donations in order to promote future innovations. The Blue Hill Meteorological Observatory was utilized for experiments conducted by members.
