= John W. R. Taylor =

British intelligence analyst and author (1922–1999)

- Born: 8 June 1922
- Died: 12 December 1999 (aged 77)
- Education: King's Ely, Soham Grammar School
- Occupations: Draughtsman, author, journalist
- Writing career
- Notable work: Editor: Jane's All the World's Aircraft 30 years

John William Ransom Taylor (8 June 1922 – 12 December 1999) was a British aviation expert and editor of a number of aviation publications.

He edited Jane's All the World's Aircraft (JAWA) for three decades during the Cold War between the Soviet Union and its Warsaw Pact allies and the USA/European alliance (NATO). He retired as Jane's editor in 1989.

Taylor specialised in what has been called Kremlinology, in that he made predictions of the performance of Soviet military equipment from poor and sometimes blurred photographs and other evidence.

In its obituary of Taylor, The Guardian wrote:

In 1961, when Western intelligence was fascinated by early glimpses of a new Soviet bomber, the Tupolev Tu-22, many analysts estimated it could reach a speed of Mach 2.5 - more than twice the speed of sound. But Taylor, after noting the shape of the aircraft's engine intakes, put the maximum at no more than Mach 1.4, which proved much closer to the truth. In 1983, he analysed the MiG-29 fighter, whose agility was the cause of much anxiety amongst NATO's war-gamers; seven years later, when Jane's was able to check his suggested measurements, they were found to be accurate to within an inch.

Taylor was educated at Ely Cathedral Choir School (King's Ely) and Soham Grammar School in Cambridgeshire. He trained as a draughtsman and joined Hawker Aircraft in 1941. There he worked on the development of the Hawker Hurricane and its successors. His specialisation was improving details of design.

He joined Jane's as editorial assistant on Jane's All the World's Aircraft (JAWA) in 1955 and four years later he took over as editor. He edited JAWA until the late 1960s.

He also provided a monthly aviation feature in Meccano Magazine up to the 1960s. He died aged 77.

== Works ==
=== Books ===
(partial list)

- Jane's All the World's Aircraft (Editor, 30 years)
- Civil Aircraft of the World,(with Gordon Swanborough) 1972 and 1974, Charles Scribner's Sons, New York
- Combat Aircraft of the World, 1969 Paragon, U.K.; 1979 G.P. Putnam's Sons, New York.
- Helicopters of the World, (with Michael J.H. Taylor) 1978, Charles Scribner's Sons, New York
- Aircraft, Aircraft!
- Helicopters and VTOL Aircraft, 1968, Doubleday & Co Inc., New York

== See also ==
- Bill Gunston
