= History by Contract =

1978 book by William J. O'Dwyer and Stella Randolph

History By Contract
- First edition
- Author: William J. O'Dwyer, Stella Randolph
- Language: English
- Publisher: Fritz Majer & Sohn
- Publication date: 1978
- ISBN: 3-922175-00-7

History by Contract is a 1978 book by early aviation researchers Major William J. O'Dwyer, U.S. Air Force Reserve (ret.) and Stella Randolph about aviation pioneer Gustave Whitehead. The book focuses on a 1948 agreement between the Smithsonian Institution and the estate of Orville Wright, which stipulates that the Smithsonian, as a condition of owning and displaying the 1903 Wright Flyer, must recognize and label it as the first heavier-than-air machine to make a manned, powered, controlled and sustained flight.

The authors of the book offer evidence which they assert shows that the Smithsonian deliberately ignored Whitehead's aeronautical work in order not to violate the agreement with the Wright estate. The net result, they allege, made Whitehead a virtual nonentity in aviation history." They and other researchers argue that Whitehead made the first successful airplane flight in August 1901, predating the Wright brothers by more than two years. History By Contract reviews evidence and material available in two earlier books about Whitehead by Randolph and added statements and affidavits from self-described witnesses to Whitehead flights.

O'Dwyer alleged that secrecy and denial by the Smithsonian kept the agreement with the Wright estate from public knowledge for years. He obtained a copy of the agreement in 1976 with help of then-Senator Lowell Weicker. The Smithsonian has said the agreement was put in place not to hide Whitehead's aviation experiments, but to prevent re-occurrence of a mistaken emphasis by the Smithsonian on the 1903 Langley Aerodrome, which the Institution wrongly identified for years as the first airplane "capable" of flight, even though it had not actually flown when Langley's workers tested it. The Smithsonian based its claim on test flights of the heavily modified Aerodrome in 1914 by Glenn Curtiss and his team.

== History behind the agreement ==
The agreement ended a bitter feud that existed between Orville Wright and the Smithsonian over credit for developing the first man-carrying airplane to achieve controlled, sustained powered flight. After short test flights of the heavily modified Langley Aerodrome by Glenn Curtiss in 1914, the Smithsonian claimed that the Aerodrome, created by former Smithsonian Secretary Samuel Langley and unsuccessfully tested shortly before the 1903 Kitty Hawk flights, was "the first man-carrying airplane in the history of the world capable of sustained free flight," according to the plaque displayed with the Aerodrome. Orville believed that claim "perverted" the history of flying machines and refused to donate the 1903 Kitty Hawk Flyer to the Smithsonian, loaning it instead to the Science Museum, London in 1928. When the Smithsonian recanted its claim in 1942, Orville agreed to have the Flyer returned to the United States. The airplane remained in protective storage in Britain during World War II and was not returned to the U.S. until 1948, when the agreement was signed by Orville Wright's executors following his death.

Critics of the agreement contend that it is a conflict of interest that continues to interfere with the Smithsonian's willingness to research and recognize anyone who might have made successful powered flights before December 17, 1903.

The controversy reignited in 2013 when Jane's All the World's Aircraft editorialized that Whitehead, not the Wright brothers, was first to make a successful airplane flight. A month later, however, Jane's stated that the editorial reflected the opinion of the editorialist and not Jane's.

In response to resulting negative publicity about the agreement, National Air and Space Museum senior curator Tom Crouch issued a statement, which said: "The contract remains in force today, a healthy reminder of a less than exemplary moment in Smithsonian history. Over the years individuals who argue for other claimants to the honor of having made the first flight have claimed that the contract is secret. It is not. I have sent many copies upon request. Critics have also charged that no Smithsonian staff member would ever be willing to entertain such a possibility and risk losing a national treasure. I can only hope that, should persuasive evidence for a prior flight be presented, my colleagues and I would have the courage and the honesty to admit the new evidence and risk the loss of the Wright Flyer."

== See also ==
- Gustave Whitehead
- Early flight
- Timeline of aviation
- Aviation history
- List of years in aviation
