= Gustave Whitehead =

German–American aviator (1874–1927)

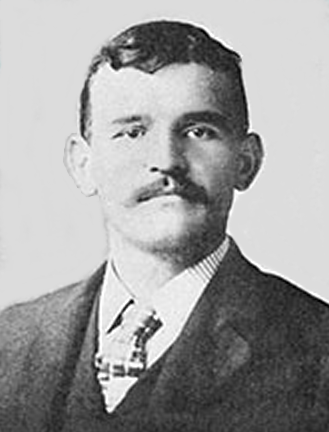
- Born: Gustav Albin Weisskopf; 1 January 1874 (Note: October 1874 is shown on the 1900 U.S. Census as Gustave Whitehead's month and year of birth. 1 January 1874 is stated on Whitehead's notation of birth in Leutershausen.); Leutershausen, Bavaria, German Empire (present-day Germany)
- Died: 10 October 1927 (aged 53); Bridgeport, Connecticut, U.S.
- Known for: Claimed flights 1901–1902
- Spouse: Louise Tuba Whitehead

Gustave Albin Whitehead (born Gustav Albin Weisskopf; 1 January 1874 – 10 October 1927) was a German-American aviation pioneer. Between 1897 and 1915, he designed and built gliders, flying machines, and engines. Controversy surrounds published accounts and Whitehead's own claims that he flew a powered machine successfully several times in 1901 and 1902, predating the first flights by the Wright brothers in 1903.

Much of Whitehead's reputation rests on a newspaper article which was written as an eyewitness report and describes his powered and sustained flight in Connecticut on 14 August 1901. Over a hundred newspapers in the U.S. and around the world soon repeated information from the article. Several local newspapers also reported on other flight experiments that Whitehead made in 1901 and subsequent years. Whitehead's aircraft designs and experiments were described or mentioned in Scientific American articles and a 1904 book about industrial progress. His public profile faded after about 1915, however, and he died in relative obscurity in 1927.

In the 1930s, a magazine article and book asserted that Whitehead had made powered flights in 1901–1902, and the book includes statements from people who said that they had seen various Whitehead flights decades earlier. These published accounts triggered debate among scholars, researchers, and aviation enthusiasts. Mainstream historians have consistently dismissed the Whitehead flight claims, which Orville Wright later described as 'mythical'.

Researchers have studied and attempted to copy Whitehead's aircraft. Since the 1980s, enthusiasts in the U.S. and Germany have built and flown replicas of Whitehead's No. 21 machine using modern engines and modern propellers, and with fundamental changes to the aircraft structure and control systems.

== Early life and career ==
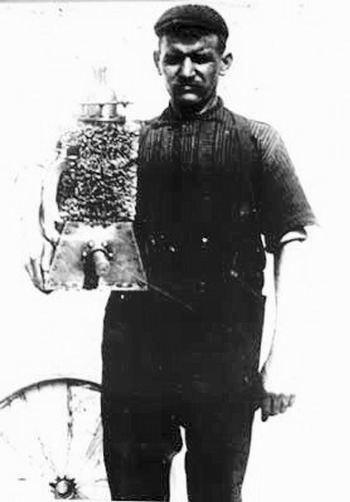
Gustave Whitehead with an early engine

Whitehead was born in Leutershausen, Bavaria, the second child of Karl Weisskopf and his wife Babetta. As a boy he showed an interest in flight, experimenting with kites and earning the nickname "the flyer". He and a friend caught and tethered birds in an attempt to learn how they flew, an activity which the police soon stopped.

His parents died in 1886 and 1887, when he was a boy. He then trained as a mechanic and traveled to Hamburg, where in 1888 he was forced to join the crew of a sailing ship. A year later he returned to Germany, then journeyed with a family to Brazil. He went to sea again for several years, learning more about wind, weather and bird flight.

Weisskopf arrived in the U.S. in 1893. He soon anglicized his name to Gustave Whitehead. The New York toy manufacturer E. J. Horsman hired Whitehead to build and operate advertising kites and model gliders. Whitehead also made plans to add a motor to propel one of his gliders. In 1893, Whitehead was in Boston where he experimented with gliders, kites, and models, and where he worked at Harvard's kite-flying meteorological station.

In 1896, Whitehead was hired as a mechanic for the Boston Aeronautical Society. He and mechanic Albert B. C. Horn built a Lilienthal-type glider and an ornithopter. Whitehead made a few short and low flights in the glider, but did not succeed in flying the ornithopter. Also in 1896, founding Society member Samuel Cabot employed Whitehead and carpenter James Crowell to build a Lilienthal glider. Cabot reported to the Society that tests with this glider were unsuccessful.

== Claims to powered flight ==
=== 1899 ===
According to an affidavit given in 1934 by Louis Darvarich, a friend of Whitehead, the two men made a motorized flight of about half a mile in Pittsburgh's Schenley Park in April or May 1899. Darvarich said they flew at a height of 20 to 25 ft (6.1 to 7.6 m) in a steam-powered monoplane aircraft and crashed into a brick building. Darvarich said he was stoking the aircraft's boiler aboard the craft and was badly scalded in the accident, requiring several weeks in a hospital. Because of this incident, Whitehead was allegedly forbidden by the police to perform any more experiments in Pittsburgh. Aviation historian William F. Trimble, pointing to a lack of contemporary proof, dismissed this story in 1982 as a case of "overactive imaginations." Whitehead's stated control method – a shifting of body weight – was said by Trimble to be insufficient to control a powered aircraft, and the supposed charcoal-fired steam powerplant could not have been powerful enough to lift itself off the ground. Whitehead was quoted in Pittsburgh newspapers in December 1899 as still constructing an aircraft, although he did say that he had flown it in Boston. A local historian claimed in 2015 that his research has uncovered evidence of the purported 1899 flight.

Whitehead and Darvarich traveled to Bridgeport, Connecticut, to find factory jobs.

=== 1901 ===
A description and photographs of Whitehead's aircraft appeared in Scientific American in June 1901, stating that the "novel flying machine" had just been completed, and was "now ready for preliminary trials."

Whitehead said he tested his unmanned machine on 3 May, according to a newspaper report. He said in the first test the machine carried 220 pounds of sand ballast and flew to an altitude of 40 to 50 feet for 1/8 of a mile (201 metres (659 ft)). On the second test Whitehead said the machine flew a distance of 1/2 mile (805 metres (2,641 ft)) for one and a half minutes before crashing into a tree. The report said Andrew Cellie and Daniel Varovi were Whitehead's financial backers and assistants. Whitehead expressed his desire to keep the location of any future experiments hidden to avoid drawing a crowd that might make a "snap-shot verdict of failure".

The claimed aviation event for which Whitehead is now best known reportedly took place in Fairfield, Connecticut, on 14 August 1901 and was described at length in an article in the edition of 18 August 1901 of the weekly Bridgeport Herald newspaper. The article, written as an eyewitness report, stated that Whitehead piloted his Number 21 aircraft in a controlled powered flight for about half a mile, reaching a height of 50 feet (15 m) and landing safely. The unsigned article is widely attributed to journalist Richard Howell, later the newspaper's editor. The flight, if it actually took place, preceded the Wright brothers' first powered flights in the Wright Flyer near Kitty Hawk in 1903 by more than two years, and exceeded the best one, which covered 852 feet (260 m) at a height of about 10 feet (3.0 m).

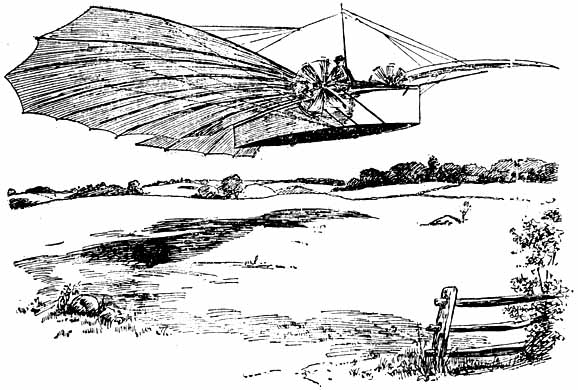
Illustration published in the Bridgeport Herald

The article was accompanied by a drawing, also credited by some Whitehead researchers to Howell, which depicted the aircraft in flight. The drawing was purportedly based on a photograph, which is believed not to exist. Information from the article was reprinted in the New York Herald, Boston Transcript and The Washington Times, which ran it on 23 August 1901. In the following months, dozens of other newspapers around the world published articles mentioning the reported flight or other aviation activity by Whitehead.

The Bridgeport Herald reported that Whitehead and another man drove to the testing area in the machine, which, when the wings were folded along its sides, functioned as a car. Two other people, including the newspaper reporter, followed on bicycles. For short distances, the Number 21's speed was close to thirty miles an hour on the uneven road, and the article said, "there seems no doubt that the machine can reel off forty miles an hour and not exert the engine to its fullest capacity.".

The newspaper reported that before attempting to pilot the aircraft, Whitehead successfully test flew it unmanned, using tether ropes and sandbag ballast. When Whitehead was ready to make a manned flight, the article said: "By this time the light was good. Faint traces of the rising sun began to suggest themselves in the east."

According to the newspaper article, trees blocked the way after the flight had started. Whitehead was quoted as saying, "I knew that I could not clear them by rising higher, and also that I had no means of steering around them by using the machinery." The article said Whitehead quickly thought of a solution to steer around the trees:

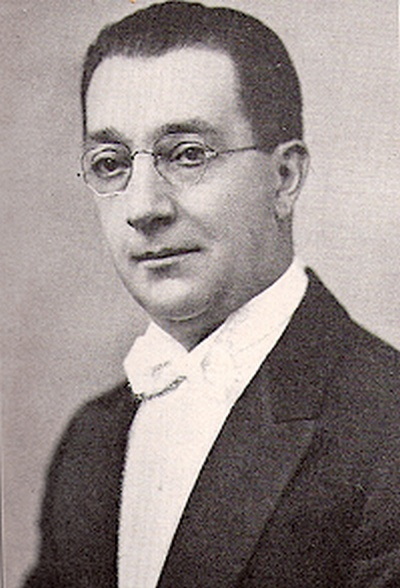
Junius Harworth said that as a boy he saw Whitehead fly on 14 August 1901.

He simply shifted his weight more to one side than the other. This careened the ship to one side. She turned her nose away from the clump of sprouts when within fifty yards of them and took her course around them as prettily as a yacht on the sea avoids a bar. The ability to control the air ship in this manner appeared to give Whitehead confidence, for he was seen to take time to look at the landscape about him. He looked back and waved his hand exclaiming, 'I've got it at last.'

When Whitehead neared the end of a field, the article said he turned off the motor and the aircraft landed "so lightly that Whitehead was not jarred in the least."

Junius Harworth, who as a boy was one of Whitehead's helpers, said Whitehead flew the airplane at another time in mid-1901 from Howard Avenue East to Wordin Avenue, along the edge of property belonging to the local gas company. Upon landing, Harworth said, the machine was turned around and another hop was made back to the starting point.

On 21 September 1901, Collier's Weekly ran a picture of Whitehead's "latest flying machine" and said that he "recently made a successful flight of half a mile". On 19 November 1901, The Evening World (New York) ran a story about Whitehead's achievements and included a photograph of him sitting on his new flying machine. The article quotes him saying, "within a year people will be buying airships as freely as they are buying automobiles today and the sky will be dotted with figures skimming the air". On 7 December 1901, the Coconino Sun ran a story that stated Gustave Whitehead was the "inventor of the flying machine" and was planning a flight to New York.

During this period of activity, Whitehead also reportedly tested an unmanned and unpowered flying machine, towed by men pulling ropes. A witness said the craft rose above telephone lines, flew across a road and landed undamaged. The distance covered was later measured at approximately 1,000 ft (300 m).

=== 1902 ===
Whitehead claimed two spectacular flights on 17 January 1902 in his improved Number 22, with a 40 hp (30 kW) motor instead of the 20 hp (15 kW) used in the Number 21, and aluminum instead of bamboo for structural components. In two published letters he wrote to American Inventor magazine, Whitehead said the flights took place over Long Island Sound. He said the distance of the first flight was about two miles (3.2 km) and the second was seven miles (11 km) in a circle at heights up to 200 ft (61 m). He said the airplane, which had a boat-like fuselage, landed safely in the water near the shore.

For steering, Whitehead said he varied the speed of the two propellers and also used the aircraft rudder. He said the techniques worked well on his second flight and enabled him to fly a big circle back to the shore where his helpers waited. In his first letter, he expressed pride in the accomplishment: "... as I successfully returned to my starting place with a machine hitherto untried and heavier than air, I consider the trip quite a success. To my knowledge it is the first of its kind. This matter has so far never been published."

In his second letter he wrote, "This coming Spring I will have photographs made of Machine No. 22 in the air." He said snapshots, apparently taken during his claimed flights of 17 January 1902, "did not come out right" because of cloudy and rainy weather. The magazine editor replied that he and readers would "await with interest the promised photographs of the machine in the air," but there were no further letters nor any photographs from Whitehead.

Anton Pruckner, a mechanic and assistant to Whitehead, signed an affidavit concerning the claimed 17 January 1902 flight: "... I knew that the flight took place because of talk by those who had seen it and because Whitehead himself had told me he made it ... I believe Whitehead made that flight, as his aircraft did fly well and with the bigger engine we had built, the plane was capable of such a flight. Whitehead was of fine moral character and never in all the long time I was associated with him or knew him did he ever appear to exaggerate. I never knew him to lie; he was a very truthful man ... I saw his aircraft fly on many occasions."

Gustave Whitehead's brother John arrived in Connecticut from California in April 1902, intending to offer help. He saw his brother's aircraft only on the ground, not in powered flight. He gave a description 33 years later of the engine and aircraft, including details of the steering apparatus:

Rudder was a combination of horizontal and vertical fin-like affair, the principle the same as in the up-to-date airplanes. For steering there was a rope from one of the foremost wing tip ribs to the opposite, running over a pulley. In front of the operator was a lever connected to a pulley: the same pulley also controlled the tail rudder at the same time.

A 1935 article in Popular Aviation magazine, which renewed interest in Whitehead, said winter weather ruined the Number 22 airplane after Whitehead placed it unprotected in his yard following his claimed flights of January 1902. The article said Whitehead did not have money to build a shelter for the aircraft because of a quarrel with his financial backer. The article also reported that in early 1903, Whitehead built a 200-horsepower eight-cylinder engine, intended to power a new aircraft. Another financial backer insisted on testing the engine in a boat on Long Island Sound, but lost control and capsized, sending the engine to the bottom.

=== 1903 ===
On 19 September 1903, Scientific American reported Whitehead made powered glider flights in a triplane machine towed by an assistant pulling a rope: "By running with the machine against the wind after the motor had been started, the aeroplane was made to skim along above the ground at heights of from 3 to 16 feet for a distance, without the operator touching, of about 350 yards. It was possible to have traveled a much longer distance, without the operator touching terra firma, but for the operator's desire not to get too far above it. Although the motor was not developing its full power, owing to the speed not exceeding 1,000 R.P.M., it developed sufficient to move the machine against the wind." The article said a 54-pound (24 kg) 12 horsepower (8.9 kW) two-cycle motor powered a two-bladed 4.5 ft (1.4 m) diameter tractor propeller. The engine shown in the article was exhibited by Whitehead at the Second Annual Exhibit of the Aero Club of America in December 1906.

== Aerial machines ==
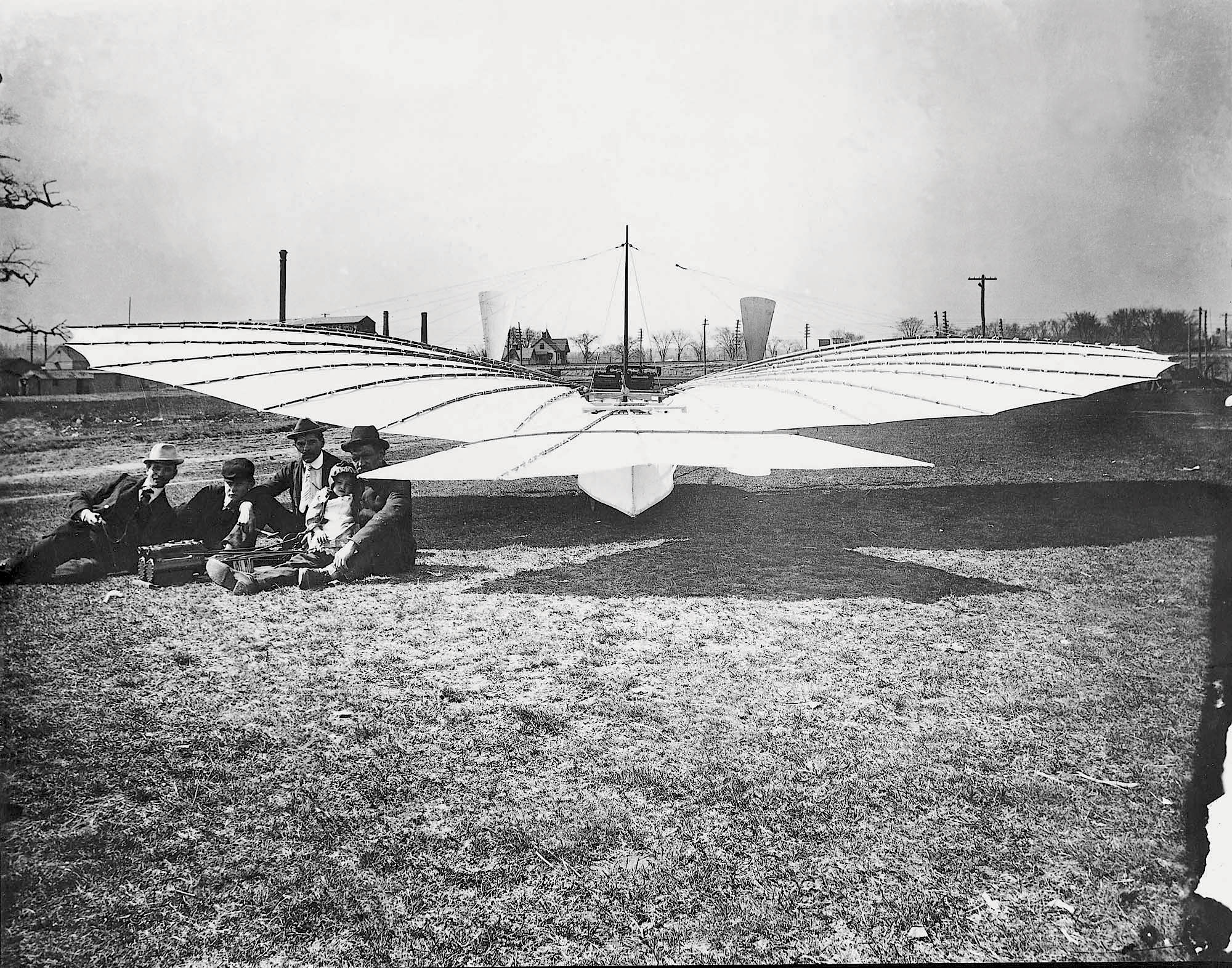
The No. 21 aircraft. Whitehead sits beside it with daughter Rose in his lap; others in the photo are not identified. A pressure-type engine rests on the ground in front of the group.

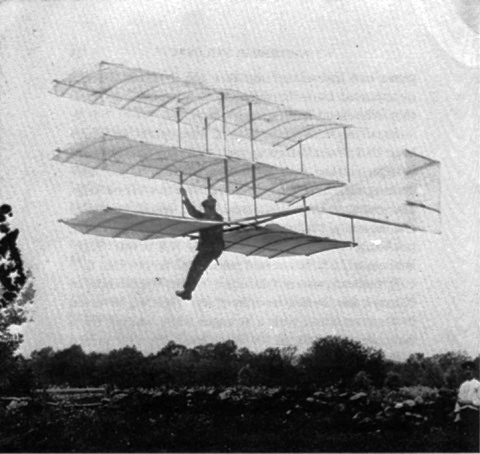
Whitehead piloting his glider of 1903

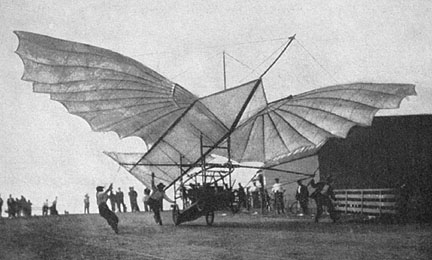
Whitehead's Albatros-type glider, c. 1905–1906

Whitehead did not give identifiers to his first aircraft, but according to Randolph and Harvey to the end of 1901 he had built "fifty-six airplanes".

Whitehead's Number 21 monoplane had a wingspan of 36 ft (11 m). The fabric-covered wings were ribbed with bamboo, supported by steel wires and were very similar to the shape of the Lilienthal glider's wings. The arrangement for folding the wings also closely followed the Lilienthal design. The craft was powered by two engines: a ground engine of 10 hp (7.5 kW), intended to propel the front wheels to reach takeoff speed, and a 20 hp (15 kW) acetylene engine powering two propellers, which were designed to counter-rotate for stability.

Whitehead described his No. 22 aircraft and compared some of its features to the No. 21 in a letter he wrote to the editor of American Inventor magazine, published 1 April 1902. He said the No. 22 had a five-cylinder 40 hp kerosene motor of his own design, weighing 120 lbs. He said ignition was "accomplished by its own heat and compression." He described the aircraft as 16 feet (4.9 m) long, made mostly of steel and aluminum with wing ribs made of steel tubing, rather than bamboo, which was used in the Number 21 aircraft. He explained that the two front wheels were connected to the kerosene motor, and the rear wheels were used for steering while on the ground. He said the wing area was 450 square feet (42 m^{2}), and the covering was "the best silk obtainable." The propellers were "6 feet in diameter ... made of wood ... covered with very thin aluminum sheeting." He said the tail and wings could all be "folded up ... and laid against the sides of the body."

In 1905, he and Stanley Beach jointly filed for a patent – issued 1908 – for an "improved aeroplane" with a V-shaped trough body and fixed bird-like wings, the pilot hanging below supported by a swing seat. A jointly-designed biplane was built by Whitehead and fitted with a Whitehead 5-cylinder, water-cooled 50 hp motor. The pointed bow of the craft comprised a metal water tank, with hot water being sprayed against the sides inside for cooling.

Whitehead also built gliders until about 1906 and was photographed flying them.

== Later career ==
In addition to his work on flying machines, Whitehead built engines. In 1904, he attended the St. Louis World's Fair and displayed an aeronautical motor. Air Enthusiast wrote: "Weisskopf's ability and mechanical skill could have made him a wealthy man at a time when there was an ever-increasing demand for lightweight engines, but he was far more interested in flying." Instead, Whitehead only accepted enough engine orders to sustain aviation experiments.

His aeronautical work was described in a chapter titled "The Conquest of the Air" in a 1904 book, Modern Industrial Progress, by Charles Henry Cochrane. The book said Whitehead had experimented with a "three-deck machine" and attached a 12 hp motor driving a tractor propeller after tests showed the craft could carry more than his weight. Test of the machine were described as "sufficiently satisfactory that another is being built."

In 1908, Whitehead designed and built a 75 hp lightweight two-cycle motor at the suggestion of aviation pioneer George A. Lawrence, who was having difficulty obtaining an aeronautic engine. The water-cooled machine was designed so that functional cylinders continued to work if others failed, a safety factor to help avoid accidents due to engine failure. The men formed Whitehead Motor Works with an office in New York City and a factory in Bridgeport, Connecticut, that built motors in three sizes: 25, 40 and 75 hp, weighing 95, 145 and 200 pounds respectively.

Whitehead's business practices were unsophisticated and he was sued by a customer, resulting in a threat that his tools and equipment would be seized. He hid his engines and most of his tools in a neighbor's cellar and continued his aviation work. One of his engines was installed by aviation pioneer Charles Wittemann in a helicopter built by Lee Burridge of the Aero Club of America, but the craft failed to fly.

Whitehead's own 1911 studies of the vertical flight problem resulted in a 60-bladed helicopter, which, unmanned, lifted itself off the ground.

He lost an eye in a factory accident and also suffered a severe blow to the chest from a piece of factory equipment, an injury that may have led to increasing attacks of angina. Despite these setbacks, he exhibited an aircraft at Hempstead, New York, as late as 1915. He continued to work and invent. He designed a braking safety device, hoping to win a prize offered by a railroad. He demonstrated it as a scale model but won nothing. He constructed an "automatic" concrete-laying machine, which he used to help build a road north of Bridgeport. These inventions brought him no more profit than did his airplanes and engines. Around 1915 Whitehead worked in a factory as a laborer and repaired motors to support his family.

He died of a heart attack, on 10 October 1927, after attempting to lift an engine out of a car he was repairing. He stumbled onto his front porch and into his home, then collapsed dead in the house.

== Rediscovery ==
Whitehead's work remained mostly unknown to the public and aeronautical community after 1911 until a 1935 article was published in Popular Aviation magazine, co-authored by educator and journalist Stella Randolph and aviation history buff Harvey Phillips. Randolph expanded the article into the book Lost Flights of Gustave Whitehead, published in 1937. She sought out people who had known Whitehead and had seen his flying machines and engines, and she obtained 16 affidavits from 14 people and included the text of their statements in the book. Four people said that they did not see flights, while the others said that they saw flights of various types, ranging from a few feet to hundreds of feet to more than a mile.

Harvard University economics professor John B. Crane wrote an article for National Aeronautic Magazine in December 1936 disputing claims and reports that Whitehead flew, but he adopted a different tone the following year, after further research. He told reporters, "There are several people still living in Bridgeport who testified to me under oath, they had seen Whitehead make flights along the streets of Bridgeport in the early 1900s." Crane reported Harworth's claim of having witnessed a 1½- mile airplane flight made by Whitehead on 14 August 1901, and he suggested that a Congressional investigation should consider the claims. In 1949, Crane published a new article in Air Affairs magazine which supported claims that Whitehead flew, but he made no reference to his first article, nor did he refute his previous evidence.

In 1963, reserve Air Force major William O'Dwyer discovered photographs in the attic of a Connecticut house showing a 1910 Whitehead "Large Albatross"-type biplane aircraft at rest on the ground. The Connecticut Aeronautical Historical Association (CAHA) asked him and his 9315th U.S. Air Force Reserve Squadron to investigate whether Whitehead had made powered flights. O'Dwyer continued his research for years and became convinced that Whitehead did fly before the Wright brothers. Former CAHA president Harvey Lippincott said in 1981 that Whitehead "may have flown 100 to 200 feet, 10 to 15 feet off the ground. This is confirmed by the witnesses that we have interviewed and talked with, and this seems reasonable for the state of the art in aviation at that time." O'Dwyer later contributed interviews of reputed flight witnesses to a second book by Stella Randolph The Story of Gustave Whitehead, Before the Wrights Flew, published in 1966. O'Dwyer and Randolph also co-authored History by Contract, published in 1978, which criticized the Smithsonian Institution for signing an agreement with the estate of Orville Wright, requiring the Smithsonian to credit only the 1903 Wright Flyer for the first powered controlled flight.

In 1968, Connecticut officially recognized Whitehead as "Father of Connecticut Aviation". The North Carolina General Assembly passed a resolution in 1985 which repudiated the Connecticut statement and gave "no credence" to the assertion that Whitehead was first to fly, citing "leading aviation historians and the world's largest aviation museum" who determined that there was "no historic fact, documentation, record or research to support the claim".

In 2013, Jane's All the World's Aircraft published an editorial which asserted that Whitehead was first to make a powered controlled flight. The editorial reignited debate over who flew first and motivated Connecticut to establish "Powered Flight Day" to honor Gustave Whitehead, rather than the Wright Brothers. The editorial relied heavily on researcher John Brown, whose claim that a vintage photo showed Whitehead's machine in powered flight was disproved by another researcher, Carroll F. Gray. Jane's corporate owner later issued a disclaimer concerning the editorial, stating that it contained the views of the editor but not necessarily the publisher.

The Royal Aeronautical Society noted that: "All available evidence fails to support the claim that Gustave Whitehead made sustained, powered, controlled flights predating those of the Wright brothers." The editors of Scientific American agree: "The data show that not only was Whitehead not first in flight, but that he may never have made a controlled, powered flight at any time."

== Evidence ==
=== Claimed witnesses ===
Andrew Cellie and James Dickie were named in the Bridgeport Herald article as two witnesses to Whitehead's early-morning flight. The article was published without a byline, but researchers and scholars on both sides of the controversy attribute it to Richard "Dick" Howell, the sports editor. James Dickie denied seeing a flight in a 1937 affidavit, taken during Stella Randolph's research. He said that he was not present at the flight on 14 August 1901, and that he thought that the newspaper story was "imaginary". He said that he did not know Andrew Cellie, the other associate of Whitehead who was supposed to be there, and that none of Whitehead's aircraft ever flew, as far as he knew. An article in Air Enthusiast, however, pointed out that Dickie's description of the airplane did not match Whitehead's Number 21.

O'Dwyer had known Dickie since childhood and wrote that he spoke to him by telephone, and that Dickie had a grudge against Whitehead:

His mood changed to anger when I asked him about Gustave Whitehead. He flatly refused to talk about Whitehead, and when I asked him why, he said: "That SOB never paid me what he owed me. My father had a hauling business and I often hitched up the horses and helped Whitehead take his airplane to where he wanted to go. I will never give Whitehead credit for anything. I did a lot of work for him and he never paid me a dime.

O'Dwyer wrote that Dickie's 1937 affidavit had "little value" and that there were inconsistencies between the affidavit and his interview with Dickie. There is no known transcript or recording of his interview.

Andrew Cellie was the other eyewitness to the flight on 14 August 1901 named by the Bridgeport Herald, but Randolph could not locate him for an interview in the 1930s. O'Dwyer searched through old Bridgeport city directories in the 1970s and concluded that the newspaper likely misspelled the man's name. He surmised that it was Andrew Suelli, a Swiss or German immigrant also known as Zulli and Whitehead's nextdoor neighbor before moving to the Pittsburgh area in 1902. Suelli's former neighbors in Fairfield told O'Dwyer that Suelli had "always claimed he was present when Whitehead flew in 1901."

Junius Harworth and Anton Pruckner sometimes worked for Whitehead, and they gave statements to Stella Randolph that they saw him fly on 14 August 1901. Anton Pruckner was a tool maker who worked for a few years with Whitehead, and he attested in 1934 to the flight. He also attested to a January 1902 flight by Whitehead over Long Island Sound; the 1988 Air Enthusiast article, however, said that "Pruckner was not present on the occasion, though he was told of the events by Weisskopf himself."

Whitehead claimed in his first letter to American Inventor that he made four trips in the airplane on 14 August 1901, and that the longest was 1½ miles. Witnesses reported seeing several different flights on 14 August 1901. The Bridgeport Herald reported that a half-mile flight occurred early in the morning on 14 August, and Whitehead and Harworth said that a one and a half-mile flight was made later that day. In all, witnesses reported that four flights took place on 14 August 1901.

The following are from the affidavits that Stella Randolph collected in the 1930s, quoted in part:

Affidavit: Joe Ratzenberger – 28 January 1936:

I recall a time, which I think was probably July or August 1901 or 1902, when this plane was started in flight on the lot between Pine and Cherry Streets. The plane flew at a height of about twelve feet from the ground, I should judge, and traveled the distance to Bostwick Avenue before it came to the ground.

Affidavit: Thomas Schweibert – 15 June 1936:

I ... recall seeing an airplane flight made by the late Gustave Whitehead approximately thirty-five years ago. I was a boy at the time, playing on a lot near the Whitehead shop on Cherry Street, and recall the incident well as we were surprised to see the plane leave the ground. It traveled a distance of approximately three hundred feet, and at a height of approximately fifteen feet in the air, to the best of my recollection.

Affidavit by Junius Harworth – 21 August 1934:

On August, fourteenth, Nineteen Hundred and One I was present and assisted on the occasion when Mr. Whitehead succeeded in flying his machine, propelled by a motor, to a height of two hundred feet off the ground or sea beach at Lordship Manor, Connecticut. The distance flown was approximately one mile and a half.

Other witnesses signed affidavits reporting additional powered flights in 1902. Elizabeth Koteles stated that she had witnessed a flight at Gypsy Spring which was 5 feet off the ground for a distance of 150 to 250 feet, and John Lesko also stated that he had witnessed a flight in Gypsy Spring. Other people signed affidavits saying that they saw short flights of varying altitudes and distances in the 1901–02 time period.

O'Dwyer organized a survey of surviving witnesses to the flights. Members of the Connecticut Aeronautical Historical Association (CAHA) and the 9315th Squadron (O'Dwyer's Air Force Reserve unit) went door-to-door in Bridgeport, Fairfield, Stratford, and Milford, Connecticut to track down Whitehead's long-ago neighbors and helpers, and they also traced some who had moved away. Of an estimated 30 persons interviewed for affidavits or on tape, 20 said that they had seen flights, eight indicated that they had heard of the flights, and two said that Whitehead did not fly.

=== Photos ===
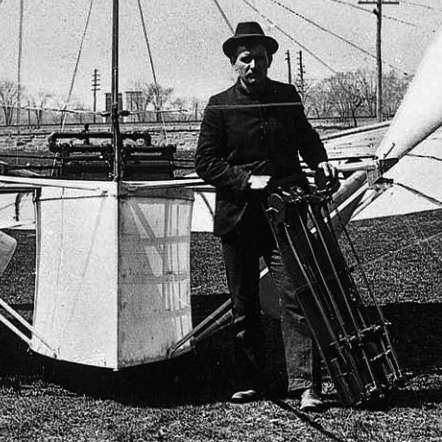
Whitehead and his Number 21 aircraft

No photograph has been found conclusively showing any manned Whitehead machine in powered flight, although such photographs have been reported to exist. The Bridgeport Daily Standard reported on 1 October 1904 that pictures were exhibited in the window of Lyon and Grumman's hardware store on Main Street in Bridgeport, Connecticut "showing Whitehead in his aeroplane about 20 feet from the ground and sailing along". The article said: "Of course he has not perfected his invention but says that he has frequently flown over half a mile. There are people who believe Whitehead is all that the newspapers have represented him to be. The photographs show that he has the ability to make short flights".

A photo was displayed in the 1906 First Annual Exhibit of the Aero Club of America at the 69th Regiment Armory in New York City which showed an unpiloted Whitehead aircraft in flight. The photo was mentioned in a 27 January 1906 Scientific American article which stated that the walls of the exhibit were covered with a large collection of photographs showing the machines of various inventors. The report said, "No photographs of ... man-carrying machines in flight were shown, nor has any trustworthy account of their reported achievements ever been published. A single blurred photograph of a large birdlike machine propelled by compressed air constructed by Whitehead in 1901 was the only other photograph besides that of Samuel Pierpont Langley's scale model machines of a motor-driven aeroplane in successful flight." Peter L. Jakab, National Air and Space Museum (NASM) Associate Director and Curator of Early Flight, suggested that the image "may very well have been an in-flight photograph" of one of Whitehead's gliders.

In 2013, Australian researcher John Brown analyzed a panoramic photograph from the 1906 Aero Club Exhibit room which shows photographic images on the wall in the background. Brown concluded that one of the images, which he examined by greatly enlarging it, was "the long lost photo of Whitehead's No. 21 in powered flight". He said that the image also correlated with the drawing that was published in the 1901 Bridgeport Herald article which reported a Whitehead flight. Brown's conclusion was disputed by aviation historian Carroll Gray, who said that a clear archival photograph is virtually identical to the enlarged image and proved "beyond any reasonable doubt" that the wall image from the 1906 exhibit showed the glider The California, built by aviation pioneer John Joseph Montgomery, on display suspended between trees at an exhibit in a California park in 1905.

== Controversy ==
=== Bridgeport Herald article and drawing ===
Stella Randolph stated in Lost Flights of Gustave Whitehead (1937) that Richard Howell wrote the article about a Whitehead flight in the Bridgeport Herald, although the article carried no byline. O'Dwyer wrote that Howell made the drawing of the No. 21 in flight which accompanied the newspaper article, saying that Howell was "an artist before he became a reporter." O'Dwyer spent hours in the Bridgeport Library studying virtually everything that Howell wrote, and he concluded: "Howell was always a very serious writer. He always used sketches rather than photographs with his features on inventions. He was highly regarded by his peers on other local newspapers. He used the florid style of the day, but was not one to exaggerate."

Andy Kosch, who built and flew a replica of No. 21, said, "If you look at the reputation of the editor of the Bridgeport Herald in those days, you find that he was a reputable man. He wouldn't make this stuff up." Howell died before the controversy began concerning Whitehead.

Gibbs-Smith doubted the veracity of the account and complained that the newspaper article "reads like a work of juvenile fiction." Aviation historian Carroll Gray asserts that similarities in the Bridgeport Herald newspaper story show that it is a broad rewrite of an article published in the New York Sun newspaper on 9 June 1901. Gray points out that the Sun article described an unmanned test of a Whitehead flying machine on 3 May 1901, but the Bridgeport Herald changed this to a manned flight.

=== Mrs. Whitehead and skeptics ===
An early source of ammunition for both sides of the debate was a 1940 interview with Whitehead's wife Louise. In the Bridgeport Sunday Post, she quoted her husband's excited first words upon returning from Fairfield on 14 August 1901: "Mama, we went up!" She said that her husband was always busy with motors and flying machines when he was not working in coal yards or factories, but she never saw any of her husband's reported flights.

Smithsonian Institution Curator of Aeronautics Peter L. Jakab said that Whitehead's wife and family did not know about his August 1901 flights. Louise Whitehead told Randolph that she sewed the material for the wings on the plane and took care of the household, but did not watch any experiments. Whitehead's daughter Rose was three years old at the time of the controversial 1901 powered flight, and the other children had not yet been born.

=== Stanley Yale Beach ===
Stanley Yale Beach was the son of Scientific American's editor (he became editor himself), and he had a long personal association with Whitehead. His father Frederick Converse Beach contributed thousands of dollars to support Whitehead's work on Stanley Beach's airplane designs from 1903–1910. Beach also claimed to have taken most of the photos that appeared in Randolph's 1937 book Lost Flights of Gustave Whitehead. In 1908, Beach and Whitehead received a patent for a monoplane glider.

There were multiple articles published in Scientific American under Beach's editorship in 1903, 1906, and 1908 which stated that Whitehead had conducted "short flights" and flew "short distances" in 1901, similar to the hops made by Maxim and Herring. Beach gave an extensive description of a "novel flying machine" in the 8 June 1901 issue and included two photographs of a "batlike craft" on the ground, not flying.

Beach drafted a statement in 1939 concerning his relationship with Whitehead, at the request of Major Lester D. Gardner, Secretary of the Institute of the Aeronautical Sciences in New York. It was not published, but Beach gave permission for changes to be made in the statement, and it was edited by Gardner and aviation publisher Earl Findley, a close friend of Orville Wright. Researcher Susan O'Dwyer Brinchman suggests that Findley and Gardner hoped that the statement would help to defend the Wright brothers' primacy in flight against the recent challenge in Randolph's article and book. Beach's edited statement was sent to Wright, who relied on it in 1945 to rebut renewed publicity about Whitehead. The edited statement said: "I do not believe that any of his machines ever left the ground under their own power in spite of the assertions of many persons who think they saw him fly." It also said that Whitehead never told Beach that he had flown. The statement offered some words of praise, saying that Whitehead "deserves a place in early aviation, due to his having gone ahead and built extremely light engines and aeroplanes. The five-cylinder kerosene one, with which he claims to have flown over Long Island Sound on 17 January 1902 was, I believe, the first aviation Diesel."

O'Dwyer believed that Beach had "recanted" his earlier view that Whitehead had flown, as indicated by the Scientific American articles. He asserted that Beach became a "politician", "rarely missing an opportunity to mingle with the Wright tide that had turned against Whitehead, notably after Whitehead's death in 1927." O'Dwyer argued in History by Contract that Beach's statement was self-contradictory. In one part, it claims that Whitehead did not fly, and in another it describes how Whitehead's machine always landed safely in "pancaking" fashion.

=== Smithsonian Institution ===
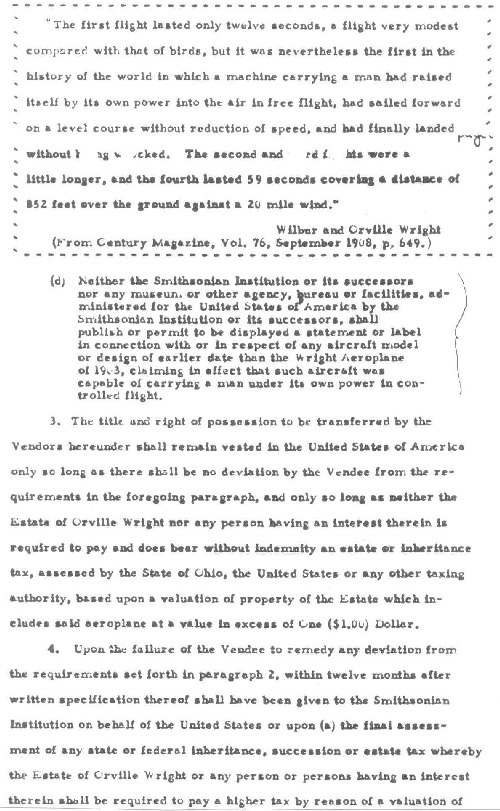
Excerpt of the agreement with the Orville Wright estate

Reports that Whitehead made a flight in Connecticut were noticed by the Smithsonian Institution. Smithsonian Secretary Samuel Langley was at the time building his manned aircraft, the Langley Aerodrome "A". Langley's chief engineer, Charles M. Manly, suspected claims for the Whitehead machine were "fraudulent". He asked Smithsonian employee F.W. Hodge to inspect the Number 21 aircraft, which Whitehead had put on display in Atlantic City, New Jersey. Hodge reported the machine did not appear to be airworthy.

For many years the Smithsonian Institution did not formally recognize the 1903 Wright Flyer as the first successful aircraft. Instead, it proclaimed the Langley Aerodrome as first to be capable of manned powered flight. This policy offended the surviving Wright brother, Orville, who sent the Wright Flyer to the Science Museum in London on long-term loan, rather than donate it to the Smithsonian. In 1942 the Smithsonian publicly recanted its position, and Orville agreed to bring back the Flyer.

As a condition for receiving the airplane, the Smithsonian signed an agreement in 1948 with executors of Orville Wright's estate. Popularly called a "contract," the agreement required the Smithsonian to recognize only the 1903 Wright Flyer, and no other aircraft, as first to make a manned, powered, controlled flight. The agreement, which was not made public, allowed the Wright family to reclaim the Flyer if the Smithsonian failed to comply. (Note: "Image". Archived from the original on 17 August 2002. of the agreement is on this "Wright Brothers". Archived from the original on 28 February 2003. of the "glennhcurtiss.com" website. The Agreement is also available upon request from the National Air and Space Museum of the Smithsonian Institution.)

In 1975, O'Dwyer learned about the agreement from Harold S. Miller, an executor of the Orville Wright estate. O'Dwyer obtained release of the document with help from Connecticut U.S. Senator Lowell Weicker and the U.S. Freedom of Information Act. O'Dwyer said that during an earlier 1969 conversation with Paul E. Garber, a Smithsonian curator of early aircraft, Garber denied that a contract existed and said he "could never agree to such a thing."

The 1978 book co-authored by O'Dwyer and Randolph, History by Contract argued that the Smithsonian compromised its objectivity when it signed a 1948 agreement with the estate of Orville Wright requiring the Institution to recognize the 1903 Wright Flyer as the first aircraft to make a manned, powered, controlled flight or forfeit possession of the aircraft. The book published correspondence between O'Dwyer and the Smithsonian in which he asked the Institution to look at the evidence and to attend interviews of people who said they saw Whitehead fly. The book called for nullification of the agreement.

George Gunther, a Connecticut state senator, said History by Contract was too heavy-handed. Gunther said he had been having "cordial" conversations with the Smithsonian about giving some credit to Whitehead, "but after O'Dwyer blasted them in his book, well, that totally turned them off."

According to the Smithsonian, the agreement was implemented to close the long-running feud with the Wright family over the Institution's false claims for the Aerodrome. Brinchman documented that Gardner and Findley, who helped Orville rebut the Whitehead claims, also participated in crafting text in the agreement that the Institution is required to use in its labeling of the Wright Flyer.

The agreement remains in effect to the present day. In 2005, Peter Jakab of the Smithsonian's National Air and Space Museum (NASM) said the agreement would not stop the Smithsonian from recognizing anyone as inventor of the first airplane if indisputable evidence were found: "We would present as accurate a presentation of the history of the invention of the airplane as possible, regardless of the consequences this might incur involving the agreement. Having said that, however, at this time, as in 1948, there is no compelling evidence that Whitehead or anyone else flew before the Wright brothers." In 2013 senior aeronautics curator Tom Crouch of NASM said, "I can only hope that, should persuasive evidence for a prior flight be presented, my colleagues and I would have the courage and the honesty to admit the new evidence and risk the loss of the Wright Flyer."

=== Purported meeting with the Wright brothers ===
In the 1930s, Whitehead was said by three witnesses to have helped the Wright brothers by revealing his secrets perhaps two years prior to their first powered flights.

Statements obtained by Stella Randolph in the 1930s from two of Whitehead's workers, Cecil Steeves and Anton Pruckner, claimed that the Wright brothers visited Whitehead's shop a year or two before their 1903 flights. The January 1988 Air Enthusiast magazine states: "Both Cecil Steeves and Junius Harworth remember the Wrights; Steeves described them and recalled their telling Weisskopf that they had received his letter indicating an exchange of correspondence." Steeves said that the Wright brothers, "under the guise of offering to help finance his inventions, actually received inside information that aided them materially in completing their own plane." Steeves related that Whitehead said to him, "Now since I have given them the secrets of my invention they will probably never do anything in the way of financing me."

Orville Wright denied that he or his brother ever visited Whitehead at his shop and stated that the first time they were in Bridgeport was 1909 "and then only in passing through on the train." This position is supported by Library of Congress historian Fred Howard, co-editor of the Wright brothers' papers, and by aviation writers Martin Caidin and Harry B. Combs.

O'Dwyer said Octave Chanute "encouraged" the Wrights to look into engines built by Whitehead. In a letter to Wilbur Wright on 3 July 1901, Chanute made a single reference to Whitehead, saying: "I have a letter from Carl E. Myers, the balloon maker, stating that a Mr. Whitehead has invented a light weight motor, and has engaged to build for Mr. Arnot of Elmira 'a motor of 10 I.H.P. ... '"

=== Orville's rebuttal ===
In 1945, Whitehead's son Charles was interviewed on Joseph Nathan Kane's national radio program Famous Firsts as the son of the first man to fly. That claim was repeated in a Liberty magazine article, which was condensed in a Reader's Digest article that reached a very large audience. Orville Wright, then in his seventies, countered the magazine articles by writing "The Mythical Whitehead Flight", which appeared in the August 1945 issue of U.S. Air Services, a publication with a far smaller but very influential readership.

Wright began by questioning why the Bridgeport Herald "withheld" such important aeronautical news for four days and suggested the story thus must not be true. Whitehead researchers have pointed out that the Herald was not a daily newspaper but a weekly, published only on Sundays. Wright noted that James Dickie, named as a witness by the Herald, had declared in an affidavit that he was not present at the event, did not know the other named witness and never saw a Whitehead aircraft fly. Wright discussed John J. Dvorak, a physics professor at Washington University in St. Louis, who had designed an engine and hired Whitehead to build it after praising him publicly. Dvorak became dissatisfied with Whitehead's progress on the engine and severed the business relationship. Wright quoted Dvorak's 1936 affidavit: "I personally do not believe that Whitehead ever succeeded in making any airplane flights." Dvorak's negative comments that Wright quoted included the phrases: "Whitehead did not possess sufficient mechanical skill ... was given to gross exaggeration ... He had delusions."

== Replica aircraft ==
To show that the No. 21 aircraft might have flown, Connecticut high school science teacher Andy Kosch, a pilot, built a replica of the craft, using existing photos and blueprints created by experts working with O'Dwyer in a project called "Hangar 21". The replica used modern ultralight engines and included other substantive changes. On 29 December 1986, Kosch flew the replica and claimed a distance of about 330 feet at six feet above the ground.

On 18 February 1998, another reproduction of No. 21 was flown 500 m (1,600 ft) in Germany. The director of the aerospace department at Deutsches Museum noted that such a replica was not proof that the original flew. The 1998 reproduction used modern research and materials such as fiberglass, and had modern engines, along with other changes.

== Honors ==
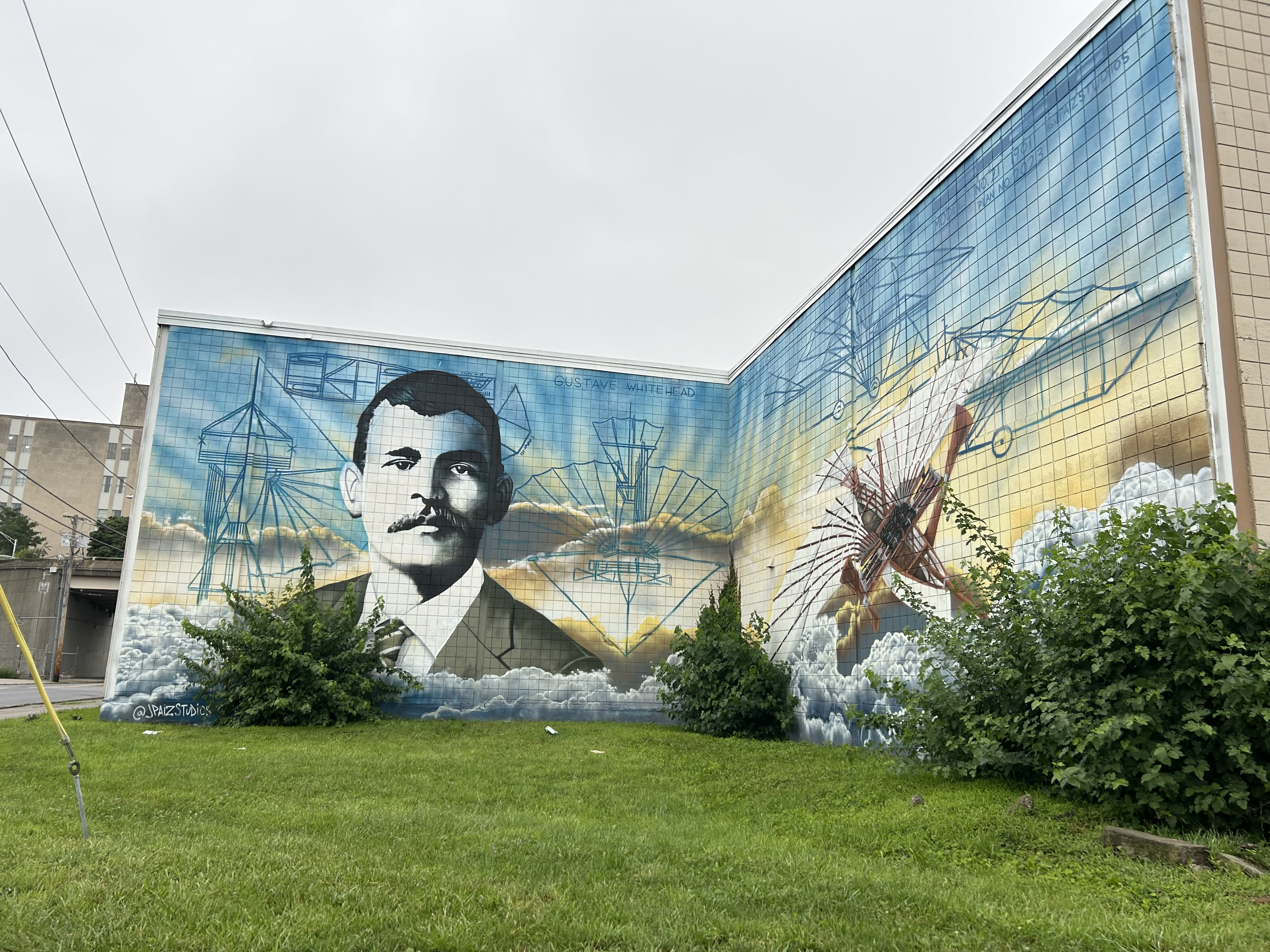
Mural dedicated to Whitehead in Bridgeport, Connecticut

Connecticut Governor John N. Dempsey designated 14 August as "Gustave Whitehead Day" in 1964 and 1968. A large headstone replaced the bronze marker of his grave at a formal dedication ceremony on 15 August 1964 attended by elected officials, members of every branch of the armed services, Clarence Chamberlain – famed aviator, CAHA, the 9315th Air Force Reserves Squadron, and surviving members of his family, his three daughters, and his assistant Anton Pruckner, commemorating Whitehead as "Father of Connecticut Aviation".

The "Aviation Pioneer Gustav Weißkopf Museum" was established in Leutershausen, Germany, in 1974.

A memorial fountain and sculpture commemorating Whitehead's "aviation first" was dedicated in May 2012 and was located on a traffic island at the intersection of Fairfield Avenue and State Street in Bridgeport It was removed around 2023.

On 25 June 2013, Connecticut Governor Dan Malloy signed into state law House Bill 6671 recognizing Gustave Whitehead as the first person to achieve powered flight.

== See also ==
- History by Contract
- Early flying machines
- Timeline of aviation
- List of firsts in aviation
- List of years in aviation
- List of German inventors and discoverers
