= Karl Jatho =

19/20th-century German aviation pioneer

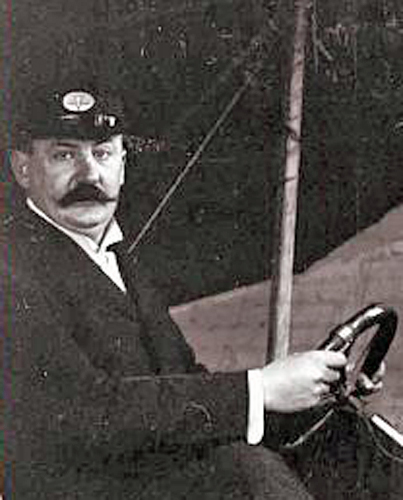
Jatho, c. 1907

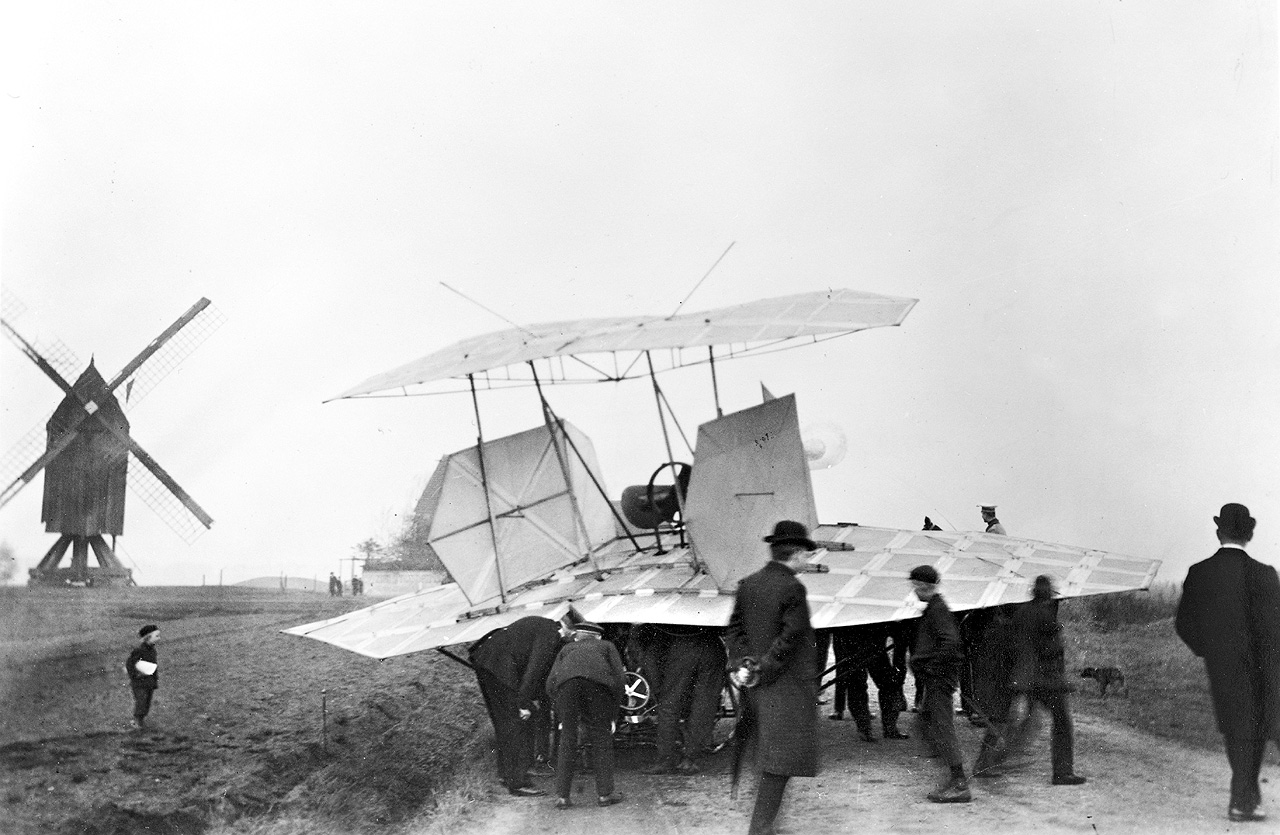
Jatho biplane 1907 at Vahrenwalder Heide

Karl Jatho (German pronunciation: [ˈkaʁl ˈjaːto]; 3 February 1873 – 8 December 1933) was a German inventor and aviation pioneer, performer and public servant of the city of Hanover.

== Achievements and claims to precedence over the Wright brothers ==
From August through November 1903, Jatho made progressively longer hops (flights) in a pusher triplane, and then a biplane, at Vahrenwalder Heide outside of Hanover. His first flight was only 18 metres (59 ft) distance at about 1 metre (3 ft 3 in) altitude. Sources differ whether his aircraft was controlled. The earliest contemporary source suggesting that it was controlled, a newspaper article from Hannoverscher Courier dating 1 August 1907, states that Jatho "has been working on controllable air vehicles for 12 years by now", however a legal document dated 19 November 1902 (an official decline by legal authorities to attend a legal test examination that Jatho had offered to them) appears to describe a design that still lacked a controlling mechanism. 30 years after his first flight tests, four eyewitnesses gave a legal testimony certified by a civil law notary in 1933 to having observed his August 1903 flight and that the given data was correct.

According to local historian Wolfgang Leonhardt quoting from Jatho's notes as well as NDR Fernsehen journalist Gunter Hartung, by November 1903 Jatho had managed to achieve a continuous flight of 60 metres (200 ft) at 2.5 metres (8 ft 2 in) altitude, a month prior to the 17 December 1903 pioneer flights of the Wright brothers spanning distances of 37, 53, 61 and 260 metres (121, 174, 200 and 853 ft) at about 3 metres (9.8 ft) altitude.

Jatho eventually gave up, noting "In spite of many efforts, (I) cannot make longer or higher flights. Motor weak." With a later machine, Jatho would make successful flights in 1909: 60 metres (200 ft) at about 3–4 metres (9.8–13.1 ft) altitude. He also founded a flying school and an aircraft factory, but did not have much success.

== Later assessments of claims and recreation attempts ==
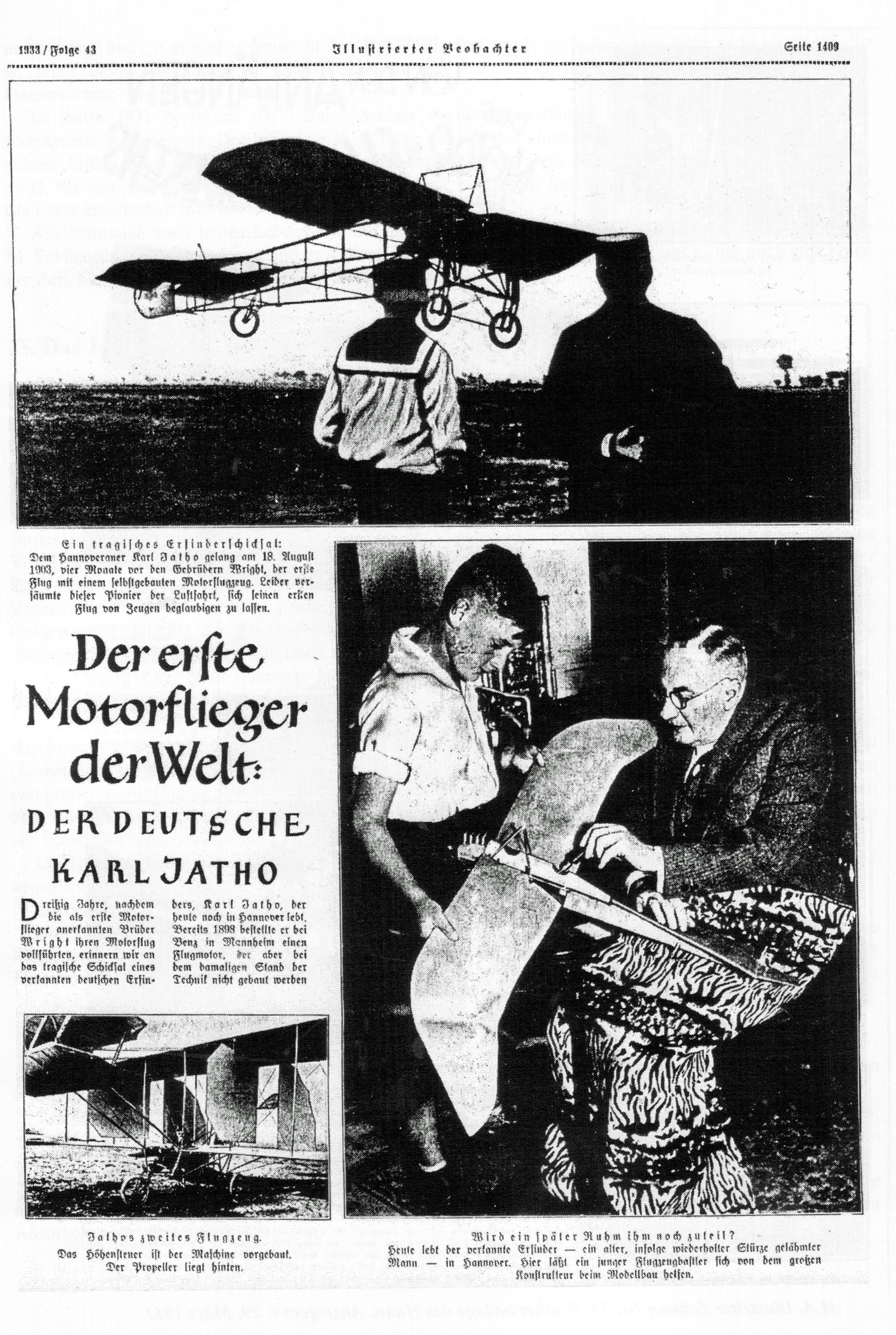
Article about Jatho from the Illustrierter Beobachter, a Nazi propaganda magazine

Although in Germany some enthusiasts credit him with making the first airplane flight, according to modern researchers such as Leonhardt and Lohmann (interviewed for the 2006 NDR Fernsehen documentary Sorry Mister Wright and the 2009 documentary Made in Hannover – German Aviation Pioneer Karl Jatho took off ahead of Orville Wright), Jatho's personal claim to a place in the history books of aviation on grounds of significant pioneer motorized flights of 18 metres (59 ft) in August and 60 metres (200 ft) in November 1903 prior to the Brothers Wright is tarnished by the fact that he took 30 years to have it legally certified by original eyewitness accounts.

In the summer of 1933, Jatho's former assistant Werner Hegge attempted to give practical proof by a flight demonstration with an exact replica of Jatho's original machine, but according to the 9 October 1933 issue of the local Hannoversche Kurier newspaper, the weather did not allow for a safe start on the scheduled date. From 1936 onwards, Hegge's replica became a public exhibit at the German Aeronautical Collection Berlin, where it was destroyed during WWII.

In September 2006, a local initiative of aviation history researchers and replica builders led by Harald Lohmann attempted another recreation with a new replica in order to bolster credence to Jatho's original claims, but again, adverse weather conditions prevented a successful start, although the replica did achieve successful ground speed that in theory would have allowed for a lift off had it not been for the strong winds on the day of the test. The team decided to wait for better weather conditions, but the legal owner of their replica, Flughafen Hannover-Langenhagen GmbH (owner of Hannover Airport where their test had taken place) that had sponsored the building of the replica, did not allow for further tests, as the airport owner instead preferred to make it a permanent exhibit at its World of Aviation (Welt der Luftfahrt) exhibition located at the airport.

== See also ==
- Early flying machines
