= Leutershausen =

- Town
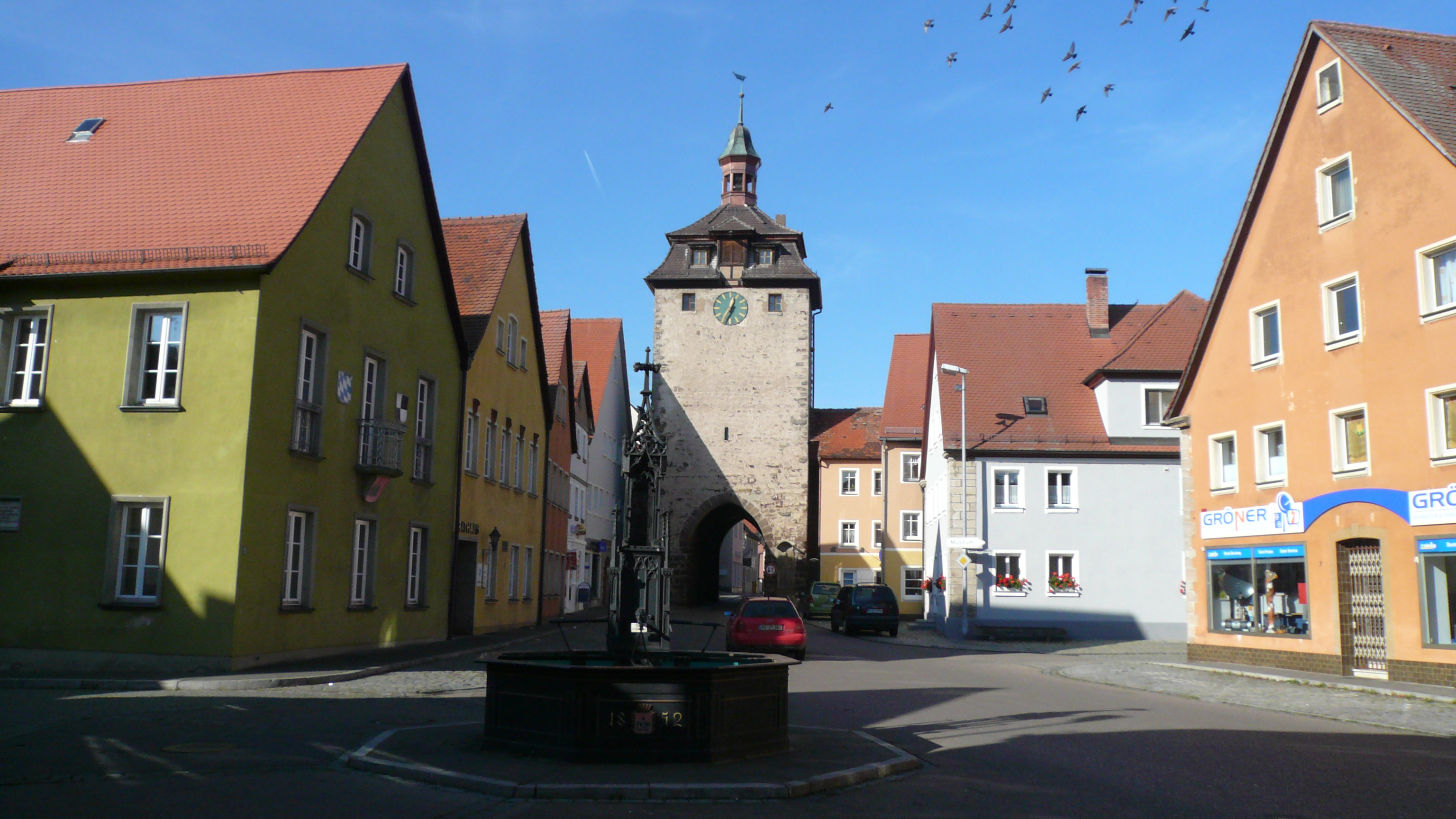
- Leutershausen, market place with the historic town gate

- Coat of arms

- Location of Leutershausen within Ansbach district
- Interactive map of Leutershausen
- Location within Germany Location within Bavaria
- Coordinates: 49°17′N 10°25′E
- Country: Germany
- State: Bavaria
- Admin. region: Mittelfranken
- District: Ansbach
- Subdivisions: 49 Ortschaften

Government
  - Mayor (2020–26): Markus Liebich

Area
  - Total: 84.07 km^{2} (32.46 sq mi)
- Elevation: 426 m (1,398 ft)

Population (2025-12-31)
  - Total: 5,606
  - Density: 66.68/km^{2} (172.7/sq mi)
- Time zone: UTC+01:00 (CET)
  - Summer (DST): UTC+02:00 (CEST)
- Postal codes: 91578
- Dialling codes: 09823
- Vehicle registration: AN
- Website: www.leutershausen.de

Leutershausen (German pronunciation: [lɔʏtɐsˈhaʊzn̩]) is a town in the district of Ansbach, in Bavaria, Germany. It is situated on the river Altmühl, 12 km west of Ansbach.

== History ==
Leutershausen was probably founded by Frankish settlers around 800. For the first time it is referred to in a privilege of Emperor Otto III as "Liuthereshusunin" in 1000.

On the 19th of April, 1945, the village was almost completely destroyed by Allied fighter-bombers.

== Sport ==
Leutershausen has a sportsclub, called TV 1862 Leutershausen. As said in the name it was founded in 1862 and has since organised sport events at the local stadium and provides training in seven different disciplines, the biggest being football and athletics. Furthermore, there are table tennis, tennis, gymnastics, triathlon and ball game departments. In June 2012 there was a big celebration weekend due to the 150th anniversary of the TV Leutershausen including the traditional Maikränzchen athletics competition and Public Viewing of the 2012 Euros.

== Sights ==
- St. Peter's Church
- Historic citywall
- Historic County Court Building
- Gustave Whitehead Museum
- Gustave Whitehead Memorial
- Museum of local history
- Leutershausen has restored one of its pre-war synagogues.

former County Court Building, since 2023 "Gustav Weisskopf Museum Pioniere der Lüfte" aviation museum

== International relations ==
Since 2000 Leutershausen is twinned with the Hungarian town of Szendrő.

== Famous people ==
- Gustave Whitehead, born Gustav Weisskopf, German-American aviation pioneer
- Christopher McNaughton, German basketball player, playing for the German national team
- Paula Kissinger (née Stern), mother of American Secretary of State and Nobel Prize recipient Henry Kissinger

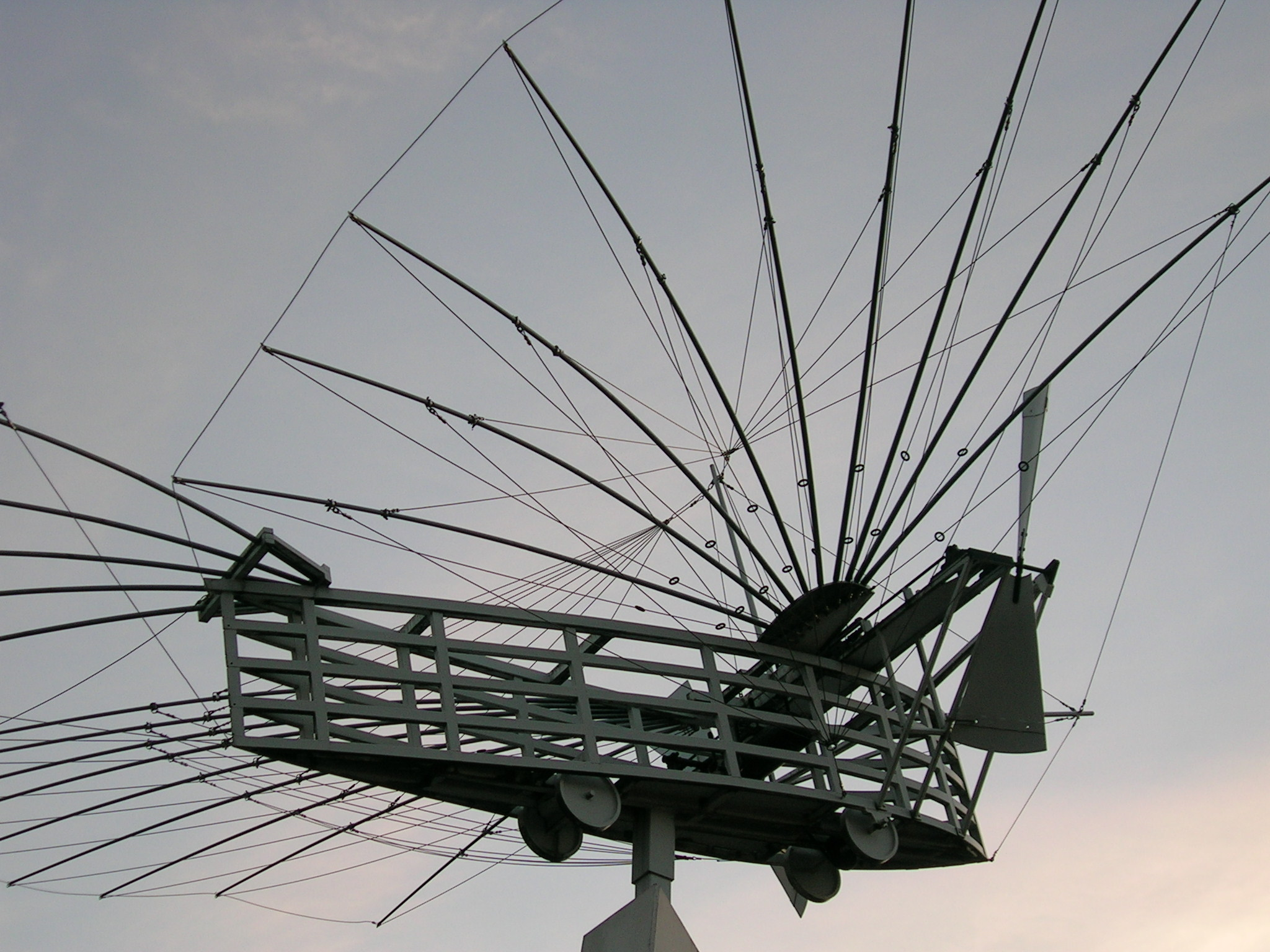
Gustave Whitehead Memorial
