= October 1903 =

Month of 1903

<<	October 1903					>>
Su	Mo	Tu	We	Th	Fr	Sa
				1	2	3
4	5	6	7	8	9	10
11	12	13	14	15	16	17
18	19	20	21	22	23	24
25	26	27	28	29	30	31

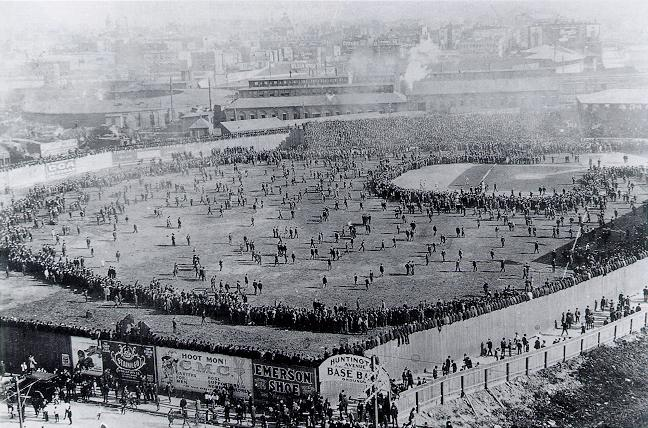
1903 World Series game at the Huntington Avenue Grounds in Boston, Massachusetts

The following events occurred in October 1903:

== October 1, 1903 (Thursday) ==
- Reinhold Burger received a German patent for an isolating vessel for everyday use.
- The first known car crash in South Africa occurred in Maitland, Cape Town, when a driver entered a level crossing and found the opposite gate closed. The Johannesburg express train ran into the car at full speed. The driver sustained only minor injuries, and his passenger was thrown clear.
- The 1903 World Series, the first modern World Series, began between the Boston Americans (the team that would later be known as the Boston Red Sox) and the Pittsburgh Pirates.
- Born:
  - George Coulouris, English actor; in Manchester, Lancashire, England (d. 1989)
  - Mary Katherine Herbert, World War II Special Operations Executive agent (d. 1983)
  - Vladimir Horowitz, American pianist; in Kyiv, Russian Empire (d. 1989)
  - Richard Loo, American actor; in Maui, Territory of Hawaii (d. 1983)
  - Yoshiyuki Tsuruta, Japanese Olympic champion swimmer; in Ishiki, Kagoshima, Kagoshima Prefecture, Japan (d. 1986)
  - Pierre Veyron, French Grand Prix motor racing driver; in Berc, Lozère, France (d. 1970)
- Died: Francis Augustus Wright, 68, English-Australian merchant sailor, gold miner and politician

== October 2, 1903 (Friday) ==
- The Mürzsteg Agreement, a joint proposal of Tsar Nicholas II of Russia and Franz Joseph I of Austria for reforms in Macedonia, was signed at the Mürzsteg Hunting Lodge in Mürzsteg, Styria, Austria-Hungary.
- 30-year-old Wong Yak Chong, the owner of a laundry in Roslindale, was shot and killed on Harrison Avenue in Chinatown, Boston, Massachusetts. Chong was a member of the Hip Sing Tong. Two Chinese men were arrested for Chong's shooting, one of whom was wearing a chain mail shirt and carrying a hatchet. Chong's killing was reported to be the first-ever murder in Boston's Chinese community, but over the next several days Boston newspapers presented the residents of Chinatown as a threatening foreign element in the city's fabric.
- Born:
  - Michele Mara, Italian cyclist; in Busto Arsizio, Lombardy, Italy (d. 1986)
  - Lajos Maszlay, Hungarian Olympic fencer; in Budapest, Austria-Hungary (d. 1979)
- Died: Friedrich Lippmann, 64, German art historian and collector

== October 3, 1903 (Saturday) ==
- In Kidderminster, England, 50-year-old Mary Swinbourne was murdered on Saturday night. A cowman discovered her body the next morning, stabbed and slashed in a manner reminiscent of the victims of the Whitechapel murders. A man with whom she had been hop-picking would be tried and acquitted of her murder.
- Four people were killed and five injured by the explosion of a cooker at the Corning Distilling Company in Peoria, Illinois.
- In New York, William Nelson, a 24-year-old General Electric employee, was killed when he fell off a new motorized bicycle he had invented.
- American author Richard Henry Savage, a veteran of the Spanish–American War, was run over by a delivery wagon at Sixth Avenue and 42nd Street in New York City. He would die of his injuries on October 11.
- While sailing from Menominee, Michigan to Egg Harbor, Wisconsin, the SS Erie L. Hackley capsized during a squall on Green Bay, killing eleven people. The steamer Sheboygan rescued eight survivors the following morning.
- Born:
  - William Berke, American film director; in Milwaukee, Wisconsin (d. 1958)
  - Sigurd Eek, Norwegian footballer; in Gjerpen, Norway (d. 1977)
  - Wim Tap, Dutch Olympic footballer; in The Hague, Netherlands (d. 1979)
- Died:
  - Benedetto Junck, 51, Italian composer
  - George Washington Scott, 74, Confederate States Army officer and businessman
  - Orland Smith, 78, American railroad executive and Union Army colonel

== October 4, 1903 (Sunday) ==
- Pope Pius X issued the encyclical E supremi.
- A sailor was fatally attacked by three sharks after falling overboard from a steamer in Havana Harbor, Cuba.
- Born:
  - Bona Arsenault, Canadian historian, genealogist and politician, member of the Canadian Parliament; in Bonaventure, Quebec, Canada (d. 1993)
  - John Vincent Atanasoff, American physicist and computer engineer; in Hamilton, New York (d. 1995)
  - Ilio Bosi, Italian communist politician and trade unionist; in Ferrara, Italy (d. 1995)
  - Medard Boss, Swiss psychoanalytic psychiatrist; in St. Gallen, Switzerland (d. 1990)
  - Pierre Garbay, French Army general; in Gray, Haute-Saône, France (d. 1980)
  - Ernst Kaltenbrunner, Austrian SS official, major perpetrator of the Holocaust; in Ried im Innkreis, Upper Austria, Austria-Hungary (d. 1946, executed by hanging)
  - Cyril Stanley Smith, British metallurgist and historian of science; in Birmingham, England (d. 1992)
- Died:
  - Hermann Cremer, 68, German Protestant theologian
  - Otto Weininger, 23, Austrian-Jewish author, shot himself to death.

== October 5, 1903 (Monday) ==
- The American cargo ship Benjamin Sewall was severely damaged by a typhoon in the Pacific Ocean near Taiwan. Captain J H Hoelstad gave the order to abandon ship. The ship's complement departed in two lifeboats, one commanded by Captain Hoelstad and the other by Chief Mate Joseph Morris.
- Born:
  - M. King Hubbert, American geologist and geophysicist; in San Saba, Texas (d. 1989)
  - Ermanno Roveri, Italian actor; in Milan, Italy (d. 1968)
- Died:
  - William Daldy, 86–87, sailor and New Zealand politician
  - Bradley Tyler Johnson, 74, Confederate brigadier general
  - William Henry McCluskey, 64, Irish soldier and a survivor of the sinking of HMS Birkenhead, was murdered while working as a security guard for De Beers at Bultfontein, South Africa.

== October 6, 1903 (Tuesday) ==
- The High Court of Australia sat for the first time.
- The Benjamin Sewall lifeboat commanded by Captain Hoelstad landed safely on the South Cape of Taiwan.
- The tunnel hole-through of the Mount Washington Transit Tunnel in Pittsburgh, Pennsylvania, took place at 5:50 p.m., when the northern and southern tunnels under construction met in the center of Mount Washington. The tunnel would open on November 30, 1904.
- Born:
  - Antonio Cárdenas Rodríguez, Mexican World War II aviator; in General Cepeda, Coahuila, Mexico (d. 1969)
  - Renato Cattaneo, Italian footballer and manager; in Alessandria, Italy (d. 1973)
  - Ernest Walton, Irish physicist, recipient of the Nobel Prize in Physics; in Dungarvan, County Waterford, Ireland (d. 1995)
- Died: Wilson S. Bissell, 55, American politician, United States Postmaster General

== October 7, 1903 (Wednesday) ==
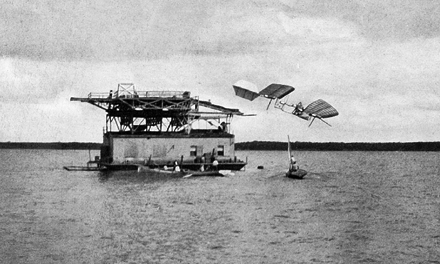
1903: Unsuccessful test flight of Langley Aerodrome

- The Aerodrome A, a piloted aircraft designed by Secretary of the Smithsonian Institution Samuel Langley, made its first test flight from a houseboat moored near Widewater, Virginia. The aircraft, piloted by Langley's assistant, Charles M. Manly, fell into the river at a forty-five-degree angle immediately after launch. Langley unrealistically placed sole blame for the failure on the launching device, without taking into account the aircraft's design flaws. Manly would make another unsuccessful test flight on December 8.
- The dispersal of a tropical storm along the Virginia Capes caused heavy rains and flooding along the entire East Coast of the United States for the next several days.
- Born:
  - Edward Chichester, 6th Marquess of Donegall, British journalist (d. 1975)
  - Herbert List, German photographer; in Hamburg, Germany (d. 1975)
- Died: Rudolf Lipschitz, 71, German mathematician

== October 8, 1903 (Thursday) ==
- A Japanese police boat from Taiwan, sent to Botel Tobago island the previous day, returned with two survivors of the Chief Mate's lifeboat from the Benjamin Sewall, a Russian seaman and a Filipino seaman. They reported that the islanders had surrounded the lifeboat, stripped its occupants of their clothes and belongings and overturned the boat, leaving the group clinging to it in the water. Most of the group dropped off one by one and drowned. Some of the survivors swam toward the island, where the Russian and Filipino men were captured and enslaved by the islanders, who forced them to chop and carry wood, still naked. They were rescued by the Japanese police. Three Japanese seamen also reached the island and hid in the mountains; they were found alive on October 14. The other seven occupants of the boat drowned.
- The Irish National Theatre Society presented the world premiere of John Millington Synge's one-act play In the Shadow of the Glen at the Molesworth Hall in Dublin, Ireland.
- The Uruguayan gunboat General Rivera was destroyed and sunk by an internal explosion at Montevideo, Uruguay. Among the sailors killed was the gunboat's commander, who was burned to death.
- In Columbus, Georgia, Superintendent of Public Works Robert L. Johnson and three workers were killed in the cave-in of a 20-foot (6.1 m) deep trench.
- Born:
  - Georgy Geshev, Bulgarian chess master; in Sofia, Principality of Bulgaria, Ottoman Empire (d. 1937)
  - Mikro (pseudonym for Christoffel Hermanus Kühn), South African author and poet; in Williston, Northern Cape, South Africa (d. 1968)
  - Ferenc Nagy, 40th Prime Minister of Hungary; in Bisse, Austria-Hungary (d. 1979)
  - Colette Peignot, French author and poet, also known by the pseudonyms Laure and Claude Araxe; in Meudon, France (d. 1938)
  - Elizabeth Wyn Wood, Canadian sculptor; in Orillia, Ontario, Canada (d. 1966)
- Died: Joseph Fisher, 60, Union Army soldier, Medal of Honor recipient

== October 9, 1903 (Friday) ==
- Irishman Paddy McCarthy and Italian Abelardo Robassio fought the first professional boxing match in Argentina at the rooms of El Gladiador magazine in Buenos Aires. McCarthy won by knockout in the fourth round.
- An editorial in The New York Times, commenting on the failure of the Langley Aerodrome two days earlier, stated, "It might be assumed that the flying machine which will really fly might be evolved by the combined and continuous efforts of mathematicians and mechanicians in from one million to ten million years."
- The Wright brothers began assembly of the 1903 Wright Flyer at Kill Devil Hill, North Carolina.

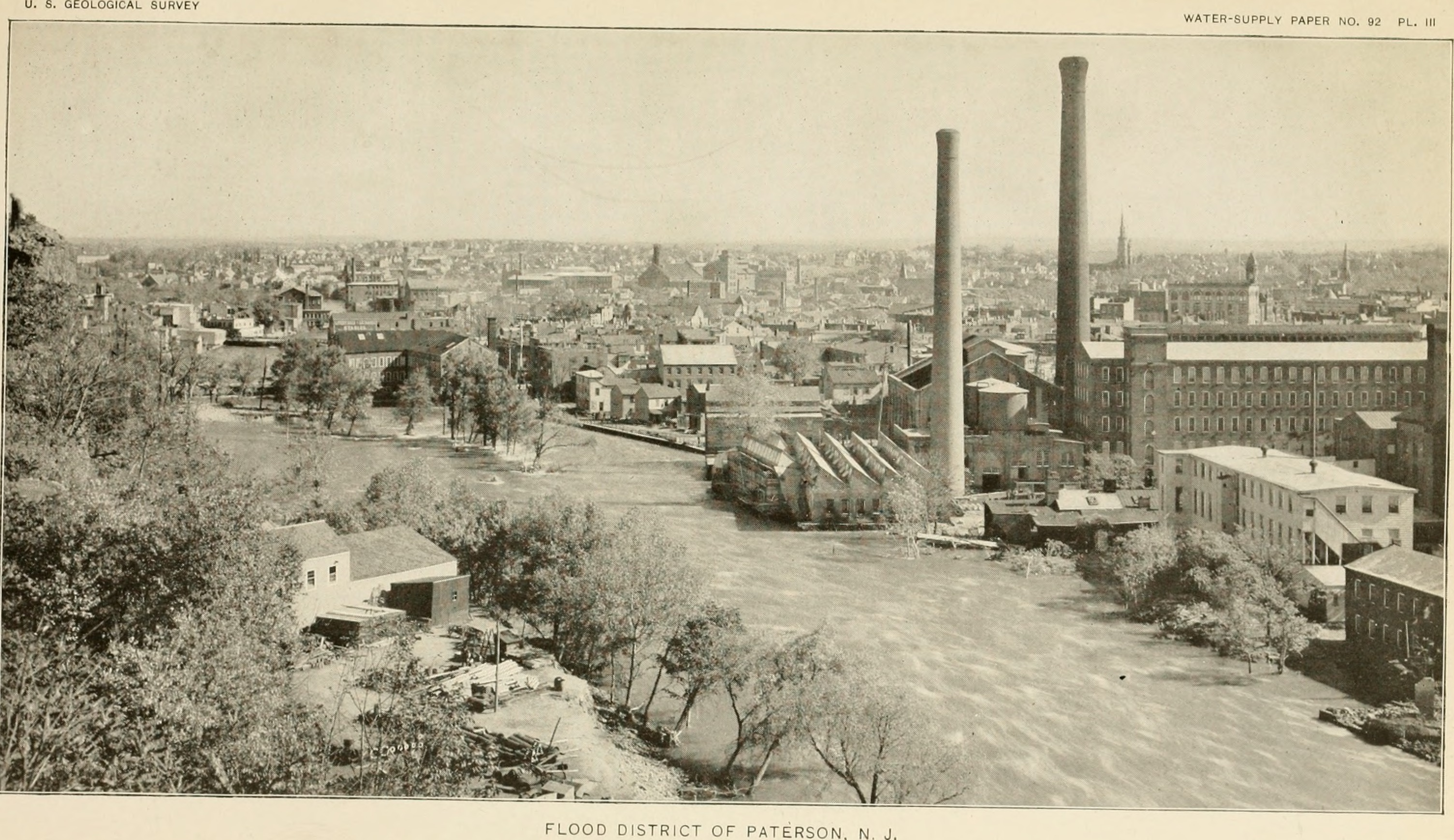
Flood district of Paterson, New Jersey

- October 1903 floods:
  - The slow-moving remnants of a tropical storm triggered the 1903 Passaic Flood in North Jersey, which lasted through October 11. 11.4 inches (290 mm) of rain fell within 24 hours on Paterson, New Jersey, which received over 15 inches (380 mm) of rain during the entire event. The Passaic River crested at 17.5 feet (5.3 m) at Little Falls, New Jersey. Bridges and dams along the Passaic and Ramapo Rivers were destroyed, including a 27-foot (8.2 m) dam at Pompton Lakes, New Jersey. The flood, the most severe in the region since the American Colonial Period, caused $7 million in damage. The Edison Manufacturing Company produced a short documentary film, Flood Scene in Paterson, N.J., shot a few days after the flood.
  - By the evening of October 9, nearly 1 foot (0.30 m) of rain had fallen on New York City in a 30-hour period. Brooklyn was flooded, forcing residents to retreat to the second floors of their buildings and interrupting streetcar service. New York City's Chief Engineer expressed the opinion that "climatic changes are going on which will make a rainfall from 3 to 5 inches an hour a thing of ordinary occurrence".
- The 27-ton gasoline boat Admiral capsized in a squall on San Francisco Bay, drowning an engineer and a passenger.
- J. E. Dolloff, one of two water suppliers in Monroe, Washington, began laying pipe to a new house. S. A. Buck, Dolloff's competitor, to whom the Monroe City Council had granted the water franchise, attached a hose to a fire plug across the street and blasted Dolloff and worker James Frazier out of the trench in which they were working. Dolloff swore out a warrant for Buck's arrest, but Buck doused the work crew two more times before his trial at 2 p.m. The "water war" in Monroe would continue in one form or another until 1923, when the town finally set up its own municipal water system.
- Born:
  - André Mourlon, French Olympic sprinter; in the 11th arrondissement of Paris, France (d. 1970)
  - Walter O'Malley, American baseball executive; in The Bronx, New York City (d. 1979)
  - Karel Steklý, Czech film director; in Prague, Bohemia, Austria-Hungary (d. 1987)
- Died: Camille du Locle, 71, French theater manager and librettist

== October 10, 1903 (Saturday) ==
- The Women's Social and Political Union was founded at the home of Emmeline Pankhurst in Manchester, England.
- American showman and kite expert Samuel Franklin Cody made an unsuccessful attempt to cross the English Channel from Dover to Calais in a collapsible boat pulled by a kite. He would try again on November 4 and succeed in making the crossing in the opposite direction (Calais to Dover) on November 7.
- The schooner barge Ocean Belle, with a crew of five, was wrecked in thick fog off Virginia Beach, Virginia. Surfman W. N. Capps of the U.S. Life-Saving Service Virginia Beach Life-Saving Station saved two men from drowning, and would be awarded the Gold Lifesaving Medal on January 15, 1904.
- Born:
  - Carlos Alves, Portuguese Olympic footballer; in Lisbon, Portugal (d. 1970)
  - Bei Shizhang, Chinese biologist and educator; in Zhenhai District, Zhejiang, China (d. 2009)
  - Lee Blair, American jazz banjoist and guitarist; in Savannah, Georgia (d. 1966)
  - Prince Charles, Count of Flanders; in Brussels, Belgium (d. 1983)
  - Vernon Duke (born Vladimir Dukelsky), American composer and songwriter; in Parafianovo, Pskov Governorate, Russian Empire (d. 1969)
  - John Eldridge Jr., United States naval aviator; in Buckingham, Virginia (d. 1942, killed in action in the Solomon Islands)
  - Ferdinand Le Drogo, French professional road bicycle racer; in Pontivy, Brittany, France (d. 1976)
- Died: Jacob Thurmann Ihlen, 70, Norwegian barrister and politician

== October 11, 1903 (Sunday) ==
- Police and immigration officials raided Boston's Chinatown, arresting every Asian male who could not produce the registration papers required under the Geary Act. Of the 250 to 300 men arrested, 50 would be deported to China; the rest were released within a few days.
- In Chapel Hill, North Carolina, Orville Wright wrote in his diary entry for this day: "We spent whole days indoors, on account of rain and water above camp." The October 1903 floods delayed the Wright brothers' assembly of the Wright Flyer.
- Rural mail carrier John Barr of Pennville, Indiana, died at the age of 21 from injuries he had recently sustained in an American football game.
- In Benton Township, Keokuk County, Iowa, 49-year-old farmer William F. Lewis died in bed after becoming ill the previous day. His widow, Belle Lewis, was prosecuted for his murder by laudanum poisoning, but was acquitted in February 1904.
- On a Blackfoot Indian reservation in Two Medicine, Montana, James Little Plume killed seven people while drunk, including an infant, two other children, and his own wife.
- A parachute jump from a balloon in San Francisco's Golden Gate Park caused two deaths. Aeronaut William H. Beals fell from his parachute within 40 feet (12 m) of the ground and died almost instantly. 17-year-old Madge Henney, leaning out of a streetcar to see Beals' descent, struck her head on an iron pole and was killed.
- Born:
  - John Cranford Adams, American educator and academic administrator, president of Hofstra University; in Boston, Massachusetts (d. 1986)
  - Rolando Aguilar, Mexican film director and screenwriter; in San Miguel de Allende, Guanajuato, Mexico (d. 1984)
  - Giulio Cerreti, Italian journalist and politician; in Sesto Fiorentino, Province of Florence, Italy (d. 1985)
  - Kazimierz Kordylewski, Polish astronomer; in Poznań, Poland (d. 1981)
  - Hans Söhnker, German film actor; in Kiel, Germany (d. 1981)
  - Karl Streibel, Nazi concentration camp commandant; in Neustadt, Upper Silesia, German Empire (d. 1986)
- Died:
  - William S. Herndon, 67, member of the United States House of Representatives from Texas
  - Richard Henry Savage, 57, American military officer and author, died of injuries from a pedestrian accident.

== October 12, 1903 (Monday) ==
- Discovery Expedition: A party of twelve men with four sledges, led by Robert Falcon Scott, set out from RRS Discovery for a journey westward up into Victoria Land. The party would later be reduced to three when the support party turned back.
- Wilhelm II, German Emperor, pardoned Moritz Lewy, who had been convicted of perjury in connection with the Konitz affair.
- The Federation of Labor mounted a protest parade in San Juan, Puerto Rico, which included a United States flag draped in mourning. Forty marchers were arrested, seven of whom received six-month prison sentences.
- A Missouri Pacific Railroad freight train ran into a Frisco freight train in the Kansas City, Missouri, switch yards, overturning a freight car onto a crowd of men. Three men were killed and three others injured.
- Born:
  - Serge Brignoni, Swiss avant-garde painter and sculptor; in Chiasso, Switzerland (d. 2002)
  - Dutch Holland (born Robert Clyde Holland), American Major League Baseball outfielder; in Middlesex, North Carolina (d. 1967)
  - Walter Jurmann, Austrian popular music and film score composer; in Vienna, Austria-Hungary (d. 1971)
  - Hervé Marc, French Olympic footballer; in Douai, Nord, France (d. 1946)
  - Cy Williams (born Berton Caswell Williams), National Football League tackle; in Canoe, Alabama (d. 1965)
- Died:
  - Olaus Alvestad, 37, Norwegian educator and newspaper editor
  - Erhard Frederiksen, 60, Danish agronomist and sugar manufacturer

== October 13, 1903 (Tuesday) ==
- The 1903 News of the World Match Play golf tournament began at Sunningdale Golf Club in Berkshire, England. It would continue through October 15.

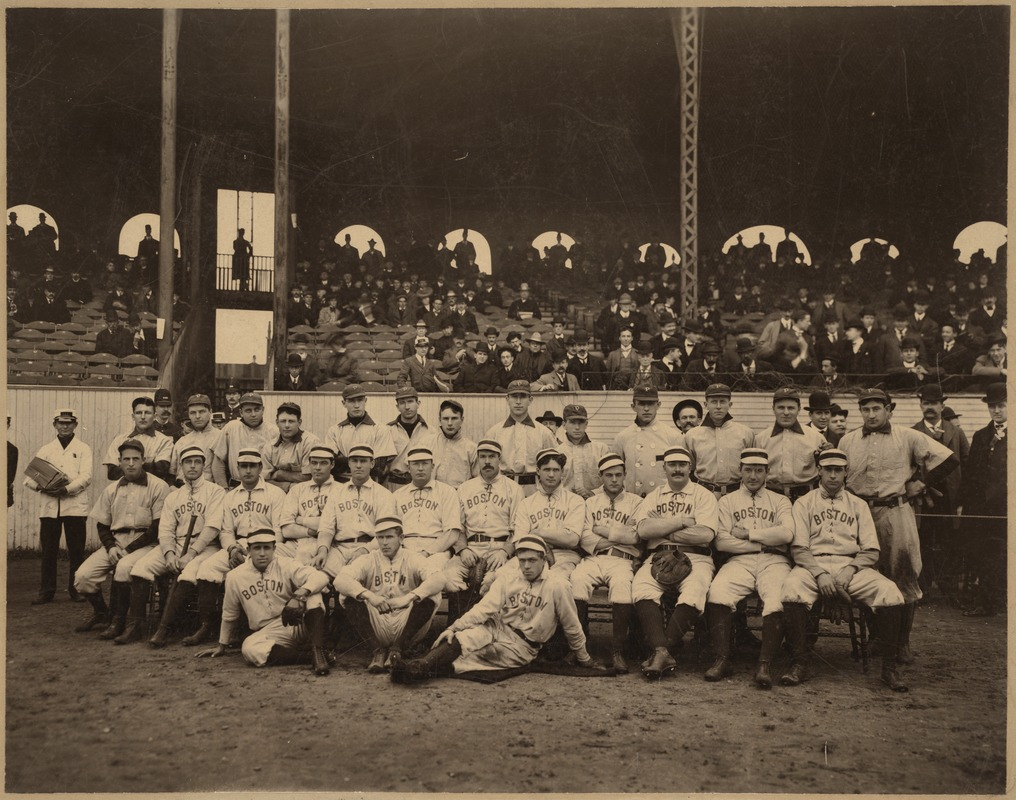
The Pittsburgh Pirates (top) and Boston Americans (bottom) prior to the eighth and deciding game of the 1903 World Series

- The Boston Americans won the 1903 World Series, defeating the Pittsburgh Pirates 5 games to 3.
- In West Rochester, Vermont, Ephraim O. Root was beaten to death with a club in his barn. Joseph Bean would be convicted of second-degree murder in Root's death in January 1904, but Governor of Vermont Charles W. Gates would pardon him on December 30, 1916 due to exculpatory evidence. As of 2013, the identity of the actual murderer was unknown.
- The operetta Babes in Toyland, with music by Victor Herbert, premiered on Broadway. It would run for 192 performances and form the basis for many later productions and adaptations.
- Born:
  - Jens Bjerre Jacobsen, Danish composer and organist; in Aarhus, Denmark (d. 1986)
  - Takiji Kobayashi, Japanese author of proletarian literature; in Shimo Kawazoe, Ōdate, Akita Prefecture, Japan (d. 1933 from police torture)
- Died:
  - George Alexander, 89, Scottish-born Canadian politician, member of the Senate of Canada
  - Sir George Frederick Duffey, 60, Irish physician, President of the Royal College of Physicians of Ireland
  - Herbert J. Ellis, 38, English banjo, mandolin and guitar player and composer
  - John Joseph Kain, 62, American Roman Catholic priest, Archbishop of St. Louis
  - Morgan B. Williams, 72, Welsh American coal industry executive and politician, member of the United States House of Representatives from Pennsylvania

== October 14, 1903 (Wednesday) ==
- The yacht Kia Ora, belonging to Horace Edgar Buckridge, a veteran of the Second Boer War and former member of the Discovery Expedition, was launched in New Zealand. Buckridge intended to sail the yacht around the world to London but would die at sea on December 7; his sailing companion, Sowden, would return to New Zealand alone.
- In London, Lord Lansdowne and Paul Cambon signed an international arbitration treaty between France and the United Kingdom.
- Born:
  - José Luccioni, French racing driver and operatic tenor; in Bastia, Corsica, France (d. 1978)
  - Charles McCallister, American Olympic water polo player; in Madison, South Dakota (d. 1997)
- Died:
  - Henry L. Mitchell, 72, American lawyer and judge, 16th Governor of Florida
  - Peppino Turco, 57, Italian songwriter ("Funiculì, Funiculà")

== October 15, 1903 (Thursday) ==
- By a vote of 19 to 10, the Australian Senate rejected Tumut, New South Wales, in favor of Bombala, New South Wales, as the future location of Australia's federal capital. The capital would ultimately be located in the new city of Canberra.
- The 1903 News of the World Match Play concluded, with James Braid defeating Ted Ray in the final.
- In the presence of thousands of people, including government officials and veterans of the American Civil War, 9-year-old William Tecumseh Sherman Thorndyke, grandson of William Tecumseh Sherman, unveiled the General William Tecumseh Sherman Monument in Washington, D.C. During his remarks at the ceremony, U.S. President Theodore Roosevelt commented, "I trust we shall soon have a proper statue of Abraham Lincoln, to whom more than to any other one man this nation owes its salvation."
- A Lexington County, South Carolina, jury acquitted former lieutenant governor James H. Tillman of murder in the January 15 shooting of newspaper editor Narciso Gener Gonzales on the grounds of self-defense. The press condemned the verdict, and Tillman retired in disgrace from public life.
- At a county fair in Washington, three men – George Dubery, Ben Michaels and Fred A. Rodgers – were arrested for kidnapping a 14-year-old African American, forcing him to eat mud and exhibiting him disguised as a "wild girl" captured in Cuba.
- Born:
  - George Amy, American film editor; in Brooklyn, New York City (d. 1986)
  - Erik Anker, Norwegian Olympic champion sailor and businessperson; in Berg, Østfold, Norway (d. 1994)
  - Otto Bettmann, founder of the Bettmann Archive; in Leipzig, Germany (d. 1998)
  - Claire Luce, American actress, dancer and singer; in Syracuse, New York (d. 1989)
- Died: Lawrence Sprague Babbitt, 64, United States Army colonel, father of Edwin Burr Babbitt

== October 16, 1903 (Friday) ==
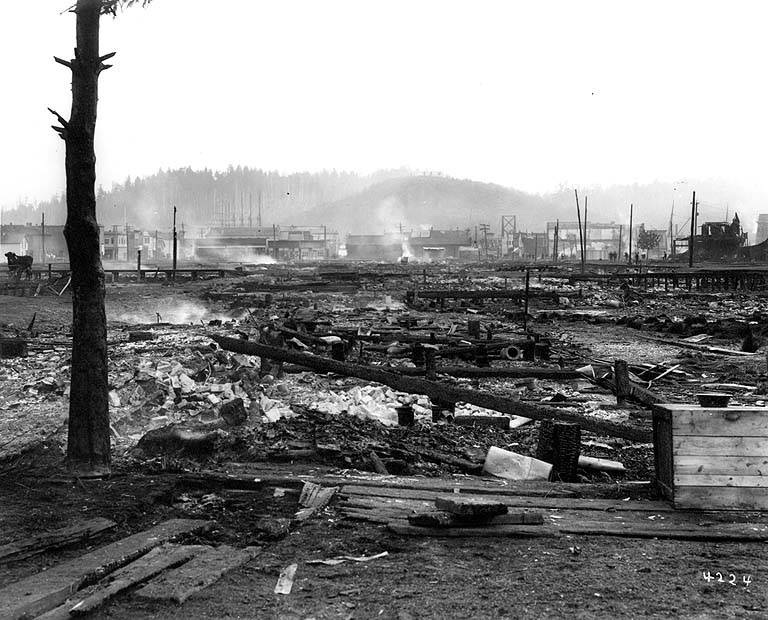
October 17, 1903: Aftermath of the previous day's fire in Aberdeen, Washington

- In the mill town of Aberdeen, Washington, a resident of the Arctic Hotel accidentally started a fire while making breakfast in his room. The fire quickly spread due to the town being constructed largely of wood; even the sidewalks were wooden, often laid over areas filled in with sawdust. The fire killed the hotel resident and two other people and destroyed about 20 acres of the city, including 140 buildings.
- Born:
  - Rex Bell (born George Francis Beldam), American actor and politician, Lieutenant Governor of Nevada; in Chicago, Illinois (d. 1962)
  - Leo Brewster, United States District Judge; in Fort Worth, Texas (d. 1979)
  - Cécile de Brunhoff (born Cécile Sabouraud), French storyteller and pianist, co-creator of Babar the Elephant; in Paris, France (d. 2003)
  - Hamilton Luske, American animator and film director (Walt Disney Productions); in Chicago, Illinois (d. 1968)
  - Big Joe Williams (born Joseph Lee Williams), American Delta blues guitarist, singer and songwriter; in Crawford, Mississippi (d. 1982)
- Died: William Quarrier, 74, Scottish shoe retailer and philanthropist

== October 17, 1903 (Saturday) ==
- Two trains carrying workers on their way to repair bridges destroyed in the Passaic Flood collided in dense morning fog on the Belvidere Division of the Pennsylvania Railroad, killing 17 men and injuring 34. According to The New York Times, "The men killed were negroes, Italians, and Hungarians." Due to the language barrier, the immigrant survivors threw stones at railroad workers who were attempting to rescue them with cutting tools, mistaking them for killers and delaying rescue efforts by over an hour.
- Seward Park, the first municipally-built playground in the United States, opened on the Lower East Side of Manhattan, New York City.
- In West St. Paul, Minnesota, 14-year-old John Nelson sustained a fatal skull fracture when he was kicked in the head during a football game.
- Born:
  - Andrei Grechko, Soviet general, Marshal of the Soviet Union; in Don Host Oblast, Russian Empire (d. 1976)
  - Leo Huberman, American socialist economist; in Newark, New Jersey (d. 1968)
  - Casey Robinson, American screenwriter, film director and producer; in Logan, Utah (d. 1979)
  - Nathanael West (born Nathan Weinstein), American author and screenwriter; in New York City (d. 1940, traffic collision)

== October 18, 1903 (Sunday) ==
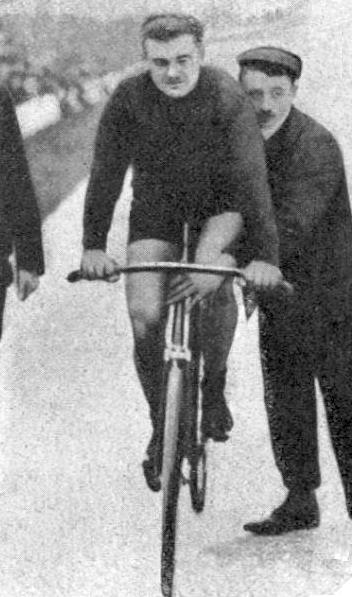
Paul Dangla sets new record

- At the Parc des Princes in Paris, French cyclist Paul Dangla set a new hour record behind a motorcycle on the track with a distance of 84.577 kilometres (52.554 mi), beating the previous record held by Tommy Hall of England.
- City Marshal George Martin of the Tulare Police Department in California was shot in the abdomen and killed while attempting to arrest an unruly saloon keeper during a water bond burning celebration.
- Born:
  - Zygmunt Wilhelm Birnbaum, Polish-American mathematician and statistician; in Lemberg, Austria-Hungary (d. 2000)
  - Lina Radke (born Karoline Batschauer), German Olympic champion middle-distance runner; in Karlsruhe, Baden-Württemberg, Germany (d. 1983)
- Died:
  - John Callcott Horsley RA, 86, English painter, designer of the first Christmas card
  - Leonidas Hubbard, 31, American journalist and explorer, died of starvation and exhaustion on an expedition for Outing magazine.

== October 19, 1903 (Monday) ==
- In Pittsburgh, Pennsylvania, a traveler crane collapsed on the Wabash Bridge, which was under construction over the Monongahela River. Ten workers were killed.
- The SS South Portland struck a rock in heavy fog near Cape Blanco, Oregon, and sank in 45 minutes. Eight passengers, two stowaways, and nine crewmen died, five of them from exposure on life rafts. Captain James B. McIntyre, the commander of the South Portland, boarded the first lifeboat with only a few men and left the ship half an hour before it sank. McIntyre was found criminally negligent, and his license was revoked on November 23.
- Born:
  - Jean Delsarte, French mathematician; in Fourmies, Nord, France (d. 1968)
  - Otto Furrer, Swiss Olympic cross-country skier; in Zermatt, Switzerland (d. 1951 in mountaineering accident on the Matterhorn)
  - Vittorio Giannini, American neo-romantic composer; in Philadelphia, Pennsylvania (d. 1966)
  - Fulvio Palmieri, Italian screenwriter; in Rome, Italy (d. 1966)
- Died: Peter Turney, 76, American soldier, jurist and politician, Governor of Tennessee

== October 20, 1903 (Tuesday) ==
- Anna Dvořák, the daughter of Czech composer Antonín Dvořák, married Dr. Josef Sobotka.
- An international tribunal issued the resolution of the Alaska boundary dispute between Canada and the United States, which took effect despite the Canadian delegates' refusal to sign it. Anti-British feeling swept through Canada due to the country's perceived betrayal by the British delegate to the tribunal, Lord Alverstone, Lord Chief Justice of England, who voted in favor of the U.S. claim. This event may have contributed to Canadians' increasing desire for autonomy from the United Kingdom as the 20th century progressed.
- Saint Louis University football quarterback John Withnell was kicked in the spine during practice, sustaining a neck injury. Withnell would die on October 22 at the age of 17 after surgery at St. Anthony's Hospital.
- Born:
  - Alida Bolten, Dutch Olympic swimmer; in Amsterdam, Netherlands (d. 1984)
  - Archie Campbell, American Major League Baseball pitcher; in Maplewood, New Jersey (d. 1989)
  - Guglielmo Del Bimbo, Italian Olympic rower; in Livorno, Province of Livorno, Italy (d. 1973)
  - Irineo Leguisamo, Uruguayan jockey; in Arerunguá, Salto Department, Uruguay (d. 1985)
  - John Davis Lodge, American actor, politician and diplomat, 79th Governor of Connecticut; in Washington, D.C. (d. 1985)
- Died:
  - James Adams VC, 63, Irish Anglican chaplain
  - Thomas Vincent Welch, 53, American politician, died of typhoid fever.

== October 21, 1903 (Wednesday) ==
- In Völklingen, Prussia, a young woman performing at a menagerie was squeezed to death by a boa constrictor. The crowd thought that her screams and struggling were part of the show, but attendants attacked the snake, which released the performer, who was already dead.
- The Cabinet of Italy resigned due to the failing health of Giuseppe Zanardelli, the Prime Minister of Italy. Zanardelli would die on December 26.
- William F. Connelly, 17-year-old left halfback of the Elmira Free Academy high school football team in Elmira, New York, missed a punt in practice and strained himself, leading to peritonitis. He would die of his injuries on October 25; Elmira Free Academy would cancel the rest of its football season.
- In Annapolis, Maryland, right guard Robert E. Lewin of the Baltimore Medical College football team died of apparent heart failure during a game against Navy.
- The boiler of a West Virginia Central Railroad freight locomotive exploded in a yard in Elkins, West Virginia, killing at least four people, one of whom, Mrs. Kate Babbett, was struck by a piece of iron in her home 500 feet (150 m) from the explosion.
- Samuel E. Morss, 50, owner and editor of the Indianapolis Sentinel and former U.S. consul general in Paris, fell 30 feet (9.1 m) to his death from his third-floor office window onto the sidewalk on Illinois Street in Indianapolis, Indiana. The fall was believed to be accidental.
- Born: Albert Vollrat, Estonian wrestler and football coach; in Tallinn, Estonia (d. 1978)

== October 22, 1903 (Thursday) ==
- The October 22 issue of The Independent featured an article by American astronomer Simon Newcomb entitled "The Outlook for the Flying Machine". In it, Newcomb wrote, "The mathematician of to-day admits that he can neither square the circle, duplicate the cube or trisect the angle. May not our mechanicians, in like manner, be ultimately forced to admit that aerial flight is one of that great class of problems with which man can never cope, and give up all attempts to grapple with it? I do not claim that this is a necessary conclusion from any past experience... Quite likely the twentieth century is destined to see the natural forces which will enable us to fly from continent to continent with a speed far exceeding that of the bird. But when we inquire whether aerial flight is possible in the present state of our knowledge; whether, which such materials as we possess, a combination of steel, cloth and wire can be made which, moved by the power of electricity or steam, shall form a successful flying machine, the outlook may be altogether different." The Wright brothers would make their first successful flights in the Wright Flyer on December 17 at Kitty Hawk, North Carolina. In later years Newcomb's views would sometimes be distorted and presented out of context to suggest that he had thought the problem of heavier-than-air flight was certain to remain unsolved.
- Due to an epidemic of yellow fever in San Antonio, Texas, Governor S. W. T. Lanham issued a proclamation quarantining the city, effective from October 22 until further notice. The proclamation forbade railway ticket agents in San Antonio from selling tickets to points within Texas, although passengers could travel to points outside the state.
- Born:
  - George Beadle, American geneticist, recipient of the Nobel Prize in Physiology or Medicine, President of the University of Chicago; in Wahoo, Nebraska (d. 1989)
  - Zlatyu Boyadzhiev, Bulgarian painter; in Brezovo, Principality of Bulgaria, Ottoman Empire (d. 1976)
  - Curly Howard (born Jerome Lester Horwitz), American comedian and actor (The Three Stooges); in Bensonhurst, Brooklyn, New York City (d. 1952)
- Died:
  - William Edward Hartpole Lecky OM PC FBA, 65, Irish historian, member of the House of Commons of the United Kingdom
  - Joe Yingling, 36, American Major League Baseball pitcher

== October 23, 1903 (Friday) ==
- Born:
  - Juan Aguilera, Chilean footballer; in Santiago, Chile (d. 1979)
  - Friedel Berges, German Olympic swimmer; in Darmstadt, Hesse, Germany (d. 1969)
  - Patrick Cogan, Irish politician (d. 1977)
  - The French Angel (born Maurice Tillet), French professional wrestler; in St. Petersburg or Ural Mountains, Russian Empire (d. 1954)
  - Thaddeus B. Hurd, American architect and historian; in Clyde, Ohio (d. 1989)
  - Werner Klingler, German film director and actor; in Stuttgart, Germany (d. 1972)
  - Hugo K. Sievers, Chilean scientist; in Rengo, Chile (d. 1971)
  - Richard Thomalla, German SS commander and war criminal; in Annahof, Upper Silesia, German Empire (d. 1945, executed by NKVD)
- Died:
  - Francis Ellingwood Abbot, 66, American philosopher and theologian, committed suicide by drug overdose.
  - Robert William Wilcox, 48, Native Hawaiian soldier and politician, delegate to the United States Congress for the Territory of Hawaii

== October 24, 1903 (Saturday) ==
- Ten workers, including seven Italians, were killed in a ceiling collapse during construction of the Fort George, Manhattan subway tunnel in New York City.
- Evelyn Nesbit returned to New York City by ship from Europe, her passage arranged by friends whom she had told about Harry Kendall Thaw's attack on her in Austria during the summer.
- Born:
  - Pramathesh Barua, Indian actor, screenwriter and director; in Gauripur, Goalpara district, Assam, British India (d. 1951)
  - Raymond Flacher, French Olympic fencer; in Paris, France (d. 1969)
  - Charlotte Perriand, French architect and designer; in Paris, France (d. 1999)
  - Melvin Purvis, American lawman and FBI agent; in Timmonsville, South Carolina (d. 1960 from gunshot wound to head)
- Died:
  - Samson Fox, 65, English engineer, industrialist and philanthropist
  - Ulrich Köhler, 64, German archeologist

== October 25, 1903 (Sunday) ==
- Novice balloonist Claude Ware, a soldier in the 64th Coast Artillery of the United States Army, was severely burned during a balloon ascension in San Francisco when he crashed into electric wires. Witnesses considered his survival remarkable. Ware had volunteered to make the ascent as a benefit performance for the family of aeronaut William Beals, who had been killed on October 11.
- At 3:45 p.m., the 179-ton fishing steamer Rainier was stranded and wrecked in Icy Strait near Juneau, Alaska. All 25 crewmen were saved, but the vessel was a total loss.
- Born:
  - Katharine Byron, American politician, member of the United States House of Representatives from Maryland; in Detroit, Michigan (d. 1976)
  - Piet van der Horst, Dutch Olympic racing cyclist; in Klundert, North Brabant, Netherlands (d. 1983)
  - Michael Dov Weissmandl, Hungarian Orthodox Jewish rabbi; in Debrecen, Austria-Hungary (d. 1957)
- Died:
  - Robert Henry Thurston, 64, American engineer
  - Albert Dresden Vandam, 60, English journalist and writer

== October 26, 1903 (Monday) ==
- Sagatel Sagouni, a mining engineer and president of the Armenian Revolutionary Society, was assassinated in Nunhead, London, England. Sagouni, who carried a revolver for self-defense, was shot four times on the doorstep of his lodgings; he was able to draw his revolver after the third shot, but was then shot in the heart.
- The New Amsterdam Theatre opened in the Theater District, Manhattan, with American actor Nat Goodwin starring as Nick Bottom in A Midsummer Night's Dream by William Shakespeare.
- SS William F. Sauber sank off Whitefish Point in Lake Superior at 3 a.m. after foundering in heavy seas. Captain W. E. Morris and oiler Frank Robinson drowned. The rest of the crew were rescued by the steamer Yale.
- In a speech to the House of Commons of Canada, Sir Wilfrid Laurier, the Prime Minister of Canada, said in reference to the resolution of the Alaska boundary dispute: "So long as Canada is a dependency of the Crown the present powers are insufficient. We must ask the Motherland for an extension to enable us to deal with similar questions in future in our own fashion according to the best light we have."
- At a City Council meeting in Lafayette, Indiana, where there was a smallpox epidemic, Councilman Washburn accused Dr. Guy P. Levering, the city health officer, of being negligent in his duties and of failing to enforce the quarantine ordinance properly. Washburn, who was himself a physician, said that a boy had come to him to be vaccinated who was already suffering from the illness, and who had infected several other people in his neighborhood. The Council appointed Dr. Whalen to serve as deputy health officer in the absence of Dr. Levering, who was in New York.
- Died:
  - Victorin de Joncières (born Félix-Ludger Rossignol), 64, French composer and music critic
  - Sir Herbert Oakeley, 73, English composer
  - Maurice Rollinat, 56, French poet and musician

== October 27, 1903 (Tuesday) ==
- In Allentown, Pennsylvania, Catharine Bechtel found the body of her 21-year-old daughter, Mabel H. Bechtel, in an underground alley next to the row home where the family lived. Mrs. Bechtel stated that she had seen two men carrying an object from a carriage into the alley early that morning. Mabel Bechtel was involved in a love triangle with two suitors: Alois Eckstein, favored by her family because he was well-off, and David Weisenberger, to whom her family objected partly because he was Jewish. Blood evidence showed that Mabel had been murdered in her own bedroom, placing her family under suspicion.
- U.S. President Theodore Roosevelt celebrated his 45th birthday with an 18-course dinner. Congratulatory letters and telegrams arrived at the White House from throughout the United States.
- According to an October 31 report in The Cincinnati Enquirer, Major League Baseball pitcher Rube Waddell, who was in Chicago starring in the melodrama Stain of Guilt, visited another theater where lions were on display and punched one of them in the jaw, provoking it into biting Waddell's left hand.
- Hunter Will Lankford was reportedly shot and killed during a fight between three white hunters and a group of Choctaws north of Boswell, Indian Territory. A Choctaw was shot and wounded.
- In Los Angeles, California, American boxers Jack Johnson and Sam McVey fought in a rematch of their February bout. Johnson won after 20 rounds, retaining the World Colored Heavyweight Championship title.
- Born:
  - Karl Gall, Austrian motorcycle racer; in Vienna, Austria-Hungary (d. 1939 from racing crash injuries and pneumonia)
  - E. Pendleton Herring, American political scientist; in Baltimore, Maryland (d. 2004)
  - Jonas Jonsson, Swedish Olympic sport shooter; in Hanebo, Bollnäs Municipality, Sweden (d. 1996)
- Died: Morris M. Estee, 69, American lawyer and politician

== October 28, 1903 (Wednesday) ==
- Born:
  - John Chamberlain, American historian, journalist and critic; in New Haven, Connecticut (d. 1995)
  - Abba P. Lerner, Russian-born British economist; in Bessarabia, Russian Empire (d. 1982)
  - Hugh Trevor (born Hugh Edwin Trevor-Thomas), American actor; in Yonkers, New York City (d. 1933 from complications following appendectomy)
  - Evelyn Waugh, English writer and novelist; in West Hampstead, London, England (d. 1966)
- Died: Emma Booth-Tucker (born Emma Moss Booth), 43, Salvation Army officer, daughter of William Booth, died in a railway accident in Missouri.

== October 29, 1903 (Thursday) ==
- Thomas Bechtel, the brother of Mabel Bechtel, who was being held during the investigation of her murder, committed suicide in a cell at the Allentown, Pennsylvania, Central Police Station. Catharine Bechtel, Mabel's mother, would be acquitted of involvement in her daughter's murder on January 23, 1904.
- In Clayton County, Iowa, farmhands discovered the skeleton of 57-year-old Justus Herwig in a burning haystack. Herwig had apparently been bludgeoned and robbed, with the fire set to destroy evidence. As of 2014 the murder remained unsolved.
- American vaudeville performer Lillian Burkhart, having recently divorced fellow actor Charles Dickson, married Los Angeles businessman George Goldsmith. Burkhart's marriage would not become publicly known until April 1904.
- Born:
  - Vivian Ellis, English musical comedy composer and lyricist; in Hampstead, London, England (d. 1996)
  - Yvonne Georgi, German dancer, choreographer and ballet mistress; in Leipzig, Germany (d. 1975)
  - Mieczysław Jastrun, Polish poet and essayist; in Korolivka, Borshchiv Raion, Austria-Hungary (d. 1983)
  - Erwin Linder, German actor; in Weinheim, Rhein-Neckar-Kreis, Baden-Württemberg, Germany (d. 1968)
  - Arturo Tabera Araoz, Spanish Roman Catholic cardinal; in El Barco de Ávila, Spain (d. 1975)
- Died: Charles A'Court, 84, British Liberal Party politician

== October 30, 1903 (Friday) ==
- George I of Greece was announced to have been named an Honorary Admiral in the British Royal Navy. The official appointment would occur the following day.
- Hugo von Hofmannsthal's drama Elektra, which he would later adapt into the libretto of the opera of the same name with music by Richard Strauss, received its world premiere in Berlin, Germany.
- In Philadelphia, Pennsylvania, fire destroyed a grain elevator and a four-story mill, killing one man, injuring five others and causing over $200,000 in damage.
- John R. Houghton, a high school football player from South Bend, Indiana, died of blood poisoning due to an injury he sustained three weeks earlier during a practice game.
- An eastbound Atchison, Topeka and Santa Fe Railway train was wrecked on a bridge over the Apishapa River, 38 miles (61 km) east of Pueblo, Colorado. 30 people were injured. The wreck was believed to have been caused by criminals removing spikes from the rails in the hope of stealing valuables from the train.
- In San Diego, California, former Iowa Congressman Benjamin T. Frederick was painting the roof of his house when he fell 20 feet (6.1 m) onto a picket fence and was impaled beneath the shoulder. Frederick would die on November 3.
- Born:
  - Krunoslav Draganović, Bosnian Croat Roman Catholic priest, Ustaše lieutenant-colonel; in Matići, Austria-Hungary (d. 1983)
  - Archduchess Helena of Austria, in Linz, Upper Austria, Austria-Hungary (d. 1924, six days after her daughter's birth)
- Died:
  - Sarah Knox-Goodrich (born Sarah Louise Browning), 78, American women's rights activist
  - Ozaki Kōyō (born Ozaki Tokutarō), 35, Japanese author and poet

== October 31, 1903 (Saturday) ==
- A large sunspot group reached the central meridian of the Sun. This sunspot group was associated with a powerful magnetic storm which caused auroral displays and disrupted telegraph systems across the Earth.
- Gerhart Hauptmann's drama Rose Bernd received its world premiere in Berlin, Germany.
- Queen's Park F.C. defeated Celtic F.C. 1–0 in the first match at the new Hampden Park football stadium in Glasgow, Scotland.

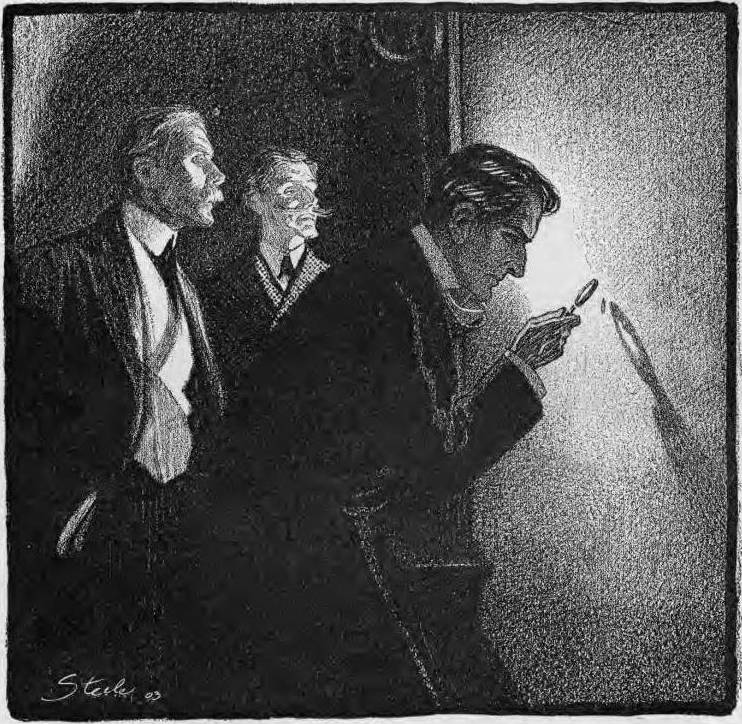
Sherlock Holmes examines a fingerprint in "The Adventure of the Norwood Builder"

- The Sherlock Holmes short story "The Adventure of the Norwood Builder" by Sir Arthur Conan Doyle was published for the first time in Collier's in the United States.
- American college football coach Pop Warner used the hidden ball trick during the second half kickoff of a game between Warner's Carlisle Indians team and Harvard. Carlisle scored a touchdown on the play, but Harvard won the game by a score of 12-11.
- Daniel Meany, a 19-year-old student at Athol High School in Athol, Massachusetts, died of a lung injury sustained when he was struck by a football during a game a week earlier.

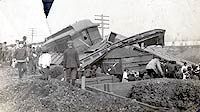
Purdue Wreck

- The Purdue Wreck in Indianapolis, Indiana, killed or mortally injured 17 people, including 14 members of the 1903 Purdue Boilermakers football team. At about 10:20 AM, a special railroad train chartered to carry players and fans from Lafayette, Indiana to Indianapolis for the annual football game against the Indiana Hoosiers crashed into a coal train while traveling through the railroad yards surrounding Indianapolis. Over 50 people were seriously injured. Purdue canceled the remainder of its football schedule for the year. One survivor of the crash, Purdue fullback Harry G. Leslie, would later be elected Governor of Indiana.
- Seven people were killed or mortally wounded in a battle between a white posse and a group of Oglala near Lightning Creek in Converse County, Wyoming. The dead included Sheriff William Miller and Deputy Sheriff Louis Falkenburg, both of the Weston County, Wyoming Sheriff's Office, and five Oglala, one of them an 11-year-old boy. A later historian referred to the event as the "last blood-spilling fight" between whites and Native Americans in Wyoming.
- Born:
  - Eric Ball, British brass band composer, arranger and conductor; in Kingswood, South Gloucestershire, England (d. 1989)
  - Bertrand de Jouvenel, French philosopher, political economist and futurist; in Paris, France (d. 1987)
  - María Teresa León, Spanish writer, activist and cultural ambassador; in Logroño, Spain (d. 1988)
  - Chris Mackintosh, Scottish rugby union internationalist, bobsledder and Olympic skier and long jumper; in Heidelberg, Baden-Württemberg, Germany (d. 1974)
  - Baptist Reinmann, German tax officer and Olympic footballer; in Herzogenaurach, Bavaria, Germany (d. 1980)
  - Joan Robinson (born Joan Violet Maurice), English economist; in Camberley, Surrey, England (d. 1983)
  - Ian Smith, Scottish rugby union player; in Melbourne, Victoria, Australia (d. 1972)
