= Charles Wharton Stork =

American poet

Stork, circa 1930

Charles Wharton Stork (12 February 1881 – 22 May 1971) was an American literary author, poet, and translator.

== Early life and education ==
Stork was born in Philadelphia on February 12, 1881 to Theophilus Baker and Hannah (Wharton) Stork. He graduated from Haverford College and Harvard University.

On August 5, 1908, he married Elisabeth von Pausinger, daughter of Franz Xaver von Pausinger, artist, of Salzburg, Austria. They had a daughter, Rosalie (Stork) Regen, and three sons, Francis Wharton, George Frederick, and Carl Alexander. In 1939, Stork was a survivor of the sinking of the SS Athenia in the Atlantic Ocean.

== Career ==
Stork taught in the Department of English at the University of Pennsylvania.

He wrote poems such as Beauty's Burden, Death - Divination and The Silent Folk. He translated the hymn "We Worship Thee, Almighty Lord" by Johan Olof Wallin, and some of the songs of Carl Michael Bellman. He is known to have disliked modernist literature.

His translations of the Swedish poet Gustaf Fröding were harshly criticized in reviews by Svea Bernhard and Ernst W. Olson but generally praised in an article by Axel J. Uppvall, who along with Olson had also rendered Fröding's poems into English.

Stork and his British contemporary, C. D. Locock, published several volumes of Swedish poetry in translation. Among the authors they covered were Gustaf Fröding, Erik Axel Karlfeldt, Birger Sjöberg, and August Strindberg.

== Death ==
Stork died in Philadelphia on May 22, 1971.

== Works ==
- Day Dreams of Greece, 1909
- The Queen of Orplede, 1910
- Sea and Bay: A Poem of New England, 1916
- Alcibiades, 1967

== Translations ==
- The Master of Palmyra, dramatic poem, 1914
- Gustaf Fröding: Selected Poems Translated from the Swedish, (New York: Macmillan, 1916)
- Anthology of Swedish Lyrics, 1750-1915 (New York: The American-Scandinavian Foundation, 1917) (including some of Carl Michael Bellman Fredman's Epistles, and Fredman's Songs)
- The Lyrical Poems of Hugo Von Hofmannsthal, 1918
- Sweden’s Laureate: Selected Poems of Verner Von Heidenstam, 1919
- The Charles Men, Pts. 1-2, historical fiction, 1920
- Modern Swedish masterpieces, short stories, 1923
- The Dragon and the Foreign Devils, non-fiction, 1928
- Martin Birck’s Youth, novel, 1930
- Short Stories of Hjalmar Söderberg, 1935
- Arcadia Borealis, poems of Erik Axel Karlfeldt, 1938
- The Tales of Ensign Stål, poems of J. L. Runeberg, 1938
- Anthology of Norwegian Lyrics, 1942
- A Second Book of Danish Verse, 1947
