= Les Monts-Verts =

- Commune
- Location of Les Monts-Verts
- Location within France Location within Occitanie
- Coordinates: 44°51′31″N 3°12′21″E
- Country: France
- Region: Occitania
- Department: Lozère
- Arrondissement: Mende
- Canton: Peyre en Aubrac
- Intercommunality: Hautes Terres de l'Aubrac

Government
  - Mayor (2024–2026): Elian Constant
- Area^{1}: 29.13 km^{2} (11.25 sq mi)
- Elevation: 1,100 m (3,600 ft)
- Highest elevation: 1,164 m (3,819 ft)
- Lowest elevation: 916 m (3,005 ft)
- Population (2023): 313
  - Density: 10.7/km^{2} (27.8/sq mi)
- Time zone: UTC+01:00 (CET)
  - Summer (DST): UTC+02:00 (CEST)
- INSEE/Postal code: 48012 /48200
- ^{1} French Land Register data, which excludes lakes, ponds, glaciers > 1 km^{2} (0.386 sq mi or 247 acres) and river estuaries.

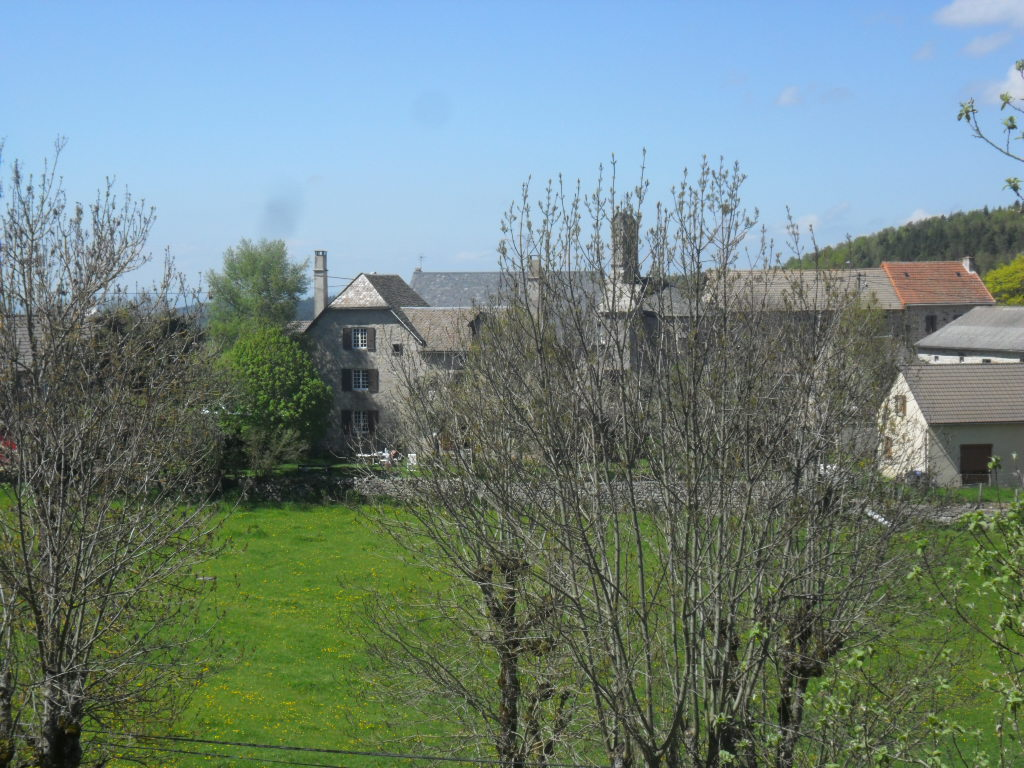
Town of the former commune of Arcomie

Les Monts-Verts (French pronunciation: [le mɔ̃ vɛʁ]; Occitan: Los Monts Verds) is a commune in the Lozère département in southern France. It was created in 1973 by the merger of three former communes: Arcomie, Le Bacon and Berc.

== See also ==
- Communes of the Lozère department
