= Robert Lang (actor) =

English actor (1934–2004)

- Born: 24 September 1934; Bristol, England
- Died: 6 November 2004 (aged 70); Sutton, England
- Years active: 1948–2004
- Spouse: Ann Bell (m. 1971)
- Children: 2

Robert Lang (24 September 1934 – 6 November 2004) was an English actor.

== Early life ==
Lang was born in Bristol, the son of Richard Lionel Lang and Lily Violet (née Ballard). He was educated at Fairfield Grammar School and St Simon’s Church School.

== Career ==
Lang's television credits include Out of the Unknown ("Deathday", 1971), That Was The Week That Was, Thriller (1 episode, 1974), The New Avengers ("The Last of the Cybernauts?", 1976), 1990, Raffles - The Last Laugh (1977), Rumpole of the Bailey (1979), Tales of the Unexpected (1979), King Lear (1983), Confessional (1989), Prince Caspian (1989), Under the Hammer (1994), Rasputin (1996), A Dance to the Music of Time (1997), The Forsyte Saga (2002), an episode of Midsomer Murders ("Destroying Angel", 2001), Our Mutual Friend (1998), and Heartbeat (2002). He also appeared in The Return of the Borrowers, as Mr Platter in 1993.

Lang's films include Interlude (1968), Dance of Death (1969), A Walk with Love and Death (1969), The House That Dripped Blood (1970), Savage Messiah (1972), The Mackintosh Man (1973), Night Watch (1973), Shout at the Devil (1976), Rogue Male (1976), The Medusa Touch (1978), The First Great Train Robbery (1978), Runners (1983), Hawks (1988), Four Weddings and a Funeral (1994) and Wilde (1997).

He played the Squire in Cider with Rosie (1998), and his final film appearance was as Mr Osbourne in Mrs. Palfrey at the Claremont (2005), screened a few months after his death from cancer in November 2004 at the age of 70.
