= Mürzsteg Hunting Lodge =

- Jagdschloss Mürzsteg
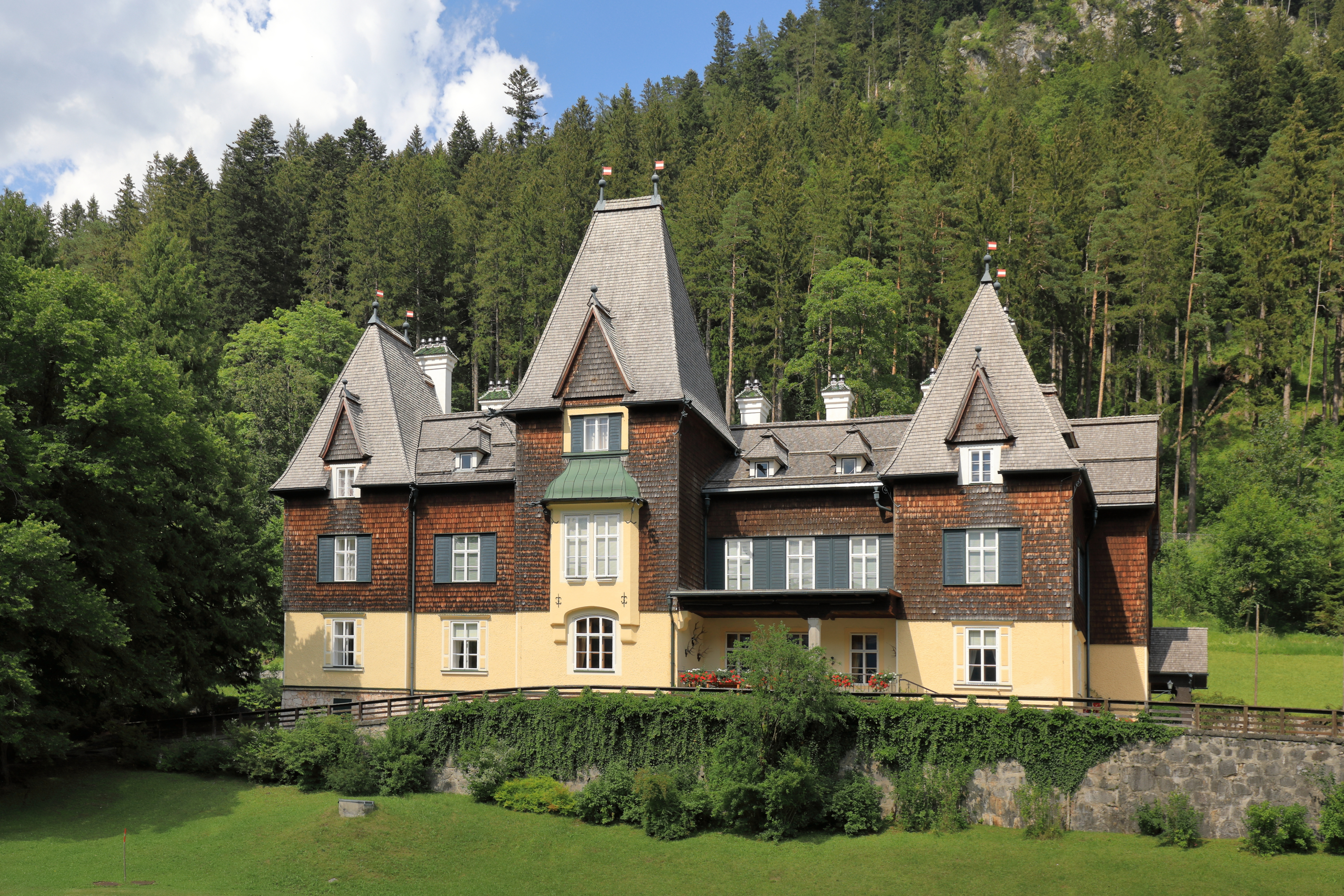
- Interactive map of the Mürzsteg Hunting Lodge area

General information
- Status: Summer home of the President of Austria
- Type: Hunting lodge
- Architectural style: Swiss
- Classification: 9656
- Location: Mürzsteg, Austria
- Coordinates: 47.677056°N 15.492083°E
- Construction started: 1869
- Completed: 1869
- Owner: Republic of Austria

Design and construction
- Architects: August Schwendenwein; Johann Romano von Ringe

The Mürzsteg Hunting Lodge is a small lodge in Mürzsteg, Styria which has served as the summer residence of the president of Austria since 1947.

== History ==
Franz Joseph I built a small lodge in the imperial hunting grounds in Neuberg an der Mürz in 1869 using his own funds. The plans for the lodge, which was built in a Swiss style, came from August Schwendenwein von Lanauberg and his partner, the court architect Johann Romano von Ringe. The lodge soon proved to be too small, and was expanded in two phases, first in 1879 and then again in 1903.

In 1883 a riding trail was established for Empress Elisabeth between Kuhhörndl and Hocheck. Elisabeth was a good and enthusiastic rider, but did not take part in the hunting activities at the lodge. Three years later in 1886, the park around the hunting lodge was established and water pipes were built into the house.

The hunting lodge was established not for appearances but for the local hunting groups. It was only after the last expansion that the lodge became a political hub. Czar Nicholas II was a guest of the emperor at the lodge in 1903. The two leaders signed the Mürzsteg Agreement there on October 3, 1903, concerning the future of the Balkans.

The lodge, which was Habsburg private property, was seized after World War I and was taken up by the Austrian Republic. A small museum was furnished in the official rooms, with some mementos of the Emperor as a hunter. The other rooms were rented out to summer guests.

During World War II the hunting lodge remained mostly empty. Toward the end of the war, Ferenc Szálasi, the leader of the Arrow Cross Party, hid treasures in the lodge in order to keep them from the advancing Red Army. The treasure included the Holy Crown of Hungary, as well as royal garments, scepters, an orb, and a sword. The cellar of the lodge stored the Holy Dexter, the preserved right hand of Stephen I of Hungary. Szálasi himself fled further west.

Today the hunting lodge is owned by the Republic of Austria. Since 1947 it has served as a summer resort for the sitting Austrian president. The lodge has been continuously renovated, though the official rooms have remained essentially unchanged. The Burghauptmannschaft of Austria now manages the lodge. According to the campaign promises of Heinz Fischer from 2004, the lodge should soon be sold, which has in any case not yet happened. Many foreign guests, including the Secretary-General of the United Nations Ban Ki-moon, have been received at the lodge.

== Construction ==
The lodge has an upper floor which is disguised as a wooden-shingled roof. It has three third-floor doors with steep tops. The interior furnishing is simple and humble, with the exception of some works from Rudolf von Alt and Franz von Pausinger.

== Literature (in German) ==
- Herwig Ebner: Burgen und Schlösser Mürztal und Leoben, 1965
- Anna Maria Sigmund: Das Haus Habsburg/Habsburgs Häuser, 1995
- Georg Clam Martinic: Österreichisches Burgenlexikon, 1992
- Gabriele Praschl-Bichler: So lebten die Habsburger, 2000
- Gerhard Stenzel: Von Schloß zu Schloß in Österreich, 1976
- Franz Preitler: Entlang der Mürz, 2013

== Links (in German) ==
- „Jagdschloss Mürzsteg“ – Presentation from the Mürzsteg municipality with several images
- Entry about Mürzsteg Hunting Lodge at Burgen-Austria (Castles Austria)
- Wilhelm II: The first trip to Mürzsteg – Both heirs Friedrich Wilhelm von Preußen and Rudolf von Habsburg, 1882
