= Dance of Death (1969 film) =

1969 British film by Glen Byam Shaw

The Dance of Death
- Directed by: David Giles
- Screenplay by: C. D. Locock (translation)
- Based on: The Dance of Death by August Strindberg
- Produced by: John Brabourne
- Starring: Laurence Olivier; Geraldine McEwan; Robert Lang
- Cinematography: Geoffrey Unsworth
- Edited by: Reginald Mills
- Music by: Anthony Bowles
- Distributed by: Paramount Pictures
- Release dates: August 1969 (UK); 13 July 1979 (New York, US)
- Running time: 149 minutes
- Country: United Kingdom
- Language: English

The Dance of Death is a 1969 film version of the 1900 play The Dance of Death by August Strindberg as presented by the National Theatre Company. It stars Laurence Olivier and Geraldine McEwan. The play was directed by Glen Byam Shaw, and the film version was directed by David Giles. Olivier reprised the role of Edgar, Geraldine reprised her role of Alice, but Robert Stephens, who played Kurt, was replaced by Robert Lang.

Previous filmed National Theatre productions include Uncle Vanya (1963) and Othello (1965). Both of these are available on DVD; however, as of 2017, The Dance of Death has never been released on DVD or video.

== Plot ==
An egocentric artillery Captain and his venomous wife engage in savage unremitting battles in their isolated island fortress off the coast of Sweden at the turn of the century. Alice, a former actress who sacrificed her career for secluded military life with Edgar, reveals on the occasion of their 25th wedding anniversary, the veritable hell their marriage has been. Edgar, an aging schizophrenic who refuses to acknowledge his severe illness, struggles to sustain his ferocity and arrogance with an animal disregard for other people. Sensing that Alice, together with her cousin and would-be lover, Kurt, may ally against him, retaliates with vicious force. Alice lures Kurt into the illusion of sharing a passionate assignation and recruits him in a plot to destroy Edgar.

== Cast ==
- Laurence Olivier as Edgar
- Geraldine McEwan as Alice
- Robert Lang as Kurt
- Janina Faye as Judith
- Malcolm Reynolds as Allan
- Peter Penry-Jones as a Lieutenant
- Maggie Riley as Karen
- Carolyn Jones (British actress) as Jenny
- Jeanne Watts as Old Woman
- Frederick Pyne as sentry
- Barry James as sentry
- David Ryall as sentry

== Reception ==
The Monthly Film Bulletin wrote: "No one who sees the National Theatre's Dance of Death for the first time in this form will find it easy to believe that it derives from a superbly controlled and absorbing theatrical experience, and even those who saw the original production may find it hard to adjust to the enormous magnification it has undergone. It is surely perverse to take a performance pitched in purely theatrical proportions and to record it, virtually without adaptation or modulation, for a medium which depends on intimacy and subtlety for its effect. The result, inevitably, is distorted, unbalanced, hopelessly 'out of true'. ... Its impact in the cinema is stunning in the worst sense – the mind boggles at its effect in a drawing room. Huge close-ups reveal the smallest mechanics and calculations of every performance (and the stilted inadequacy of some of the support). Microphones amplify each word with no apparent attempt at balance so that everyone seems to be shouting his head off – particularly disastrous in the case of Olivier, who uses a staccato military bark that shatters the eardrums. And yet all the time one is frustratedly aware that a marvellous film lurks in Strindberg's original."

The Radio Times Guide to Films gave the film 2/5 stars, writing: "One of Sir Laurence Olivier's last stage performances is captured on film in this static version of the National Theatre production of August Strindberg's classic play. ... As a record of Olivier's mesmerising stagecraft, it's a must. As a film, though, it's a torpid bore, with the camera placed in one position throughout the angst-ridden action."

Leslie Halliwell said: "Too-literal film transcription of an applauded theatrical production, with the camera anchored firmly in the middle of the stalls."

Variety wrote: "It may be briefly described as a tour de force and a hard sell. ... It's done with great theatrical skill. The right serious-minded film buffs will enjoy its merits. But the run-of-mill film fans will moan, Hold! Enough! "
