= Charles Dealtry Locock =

British literary scholar, editor and translator

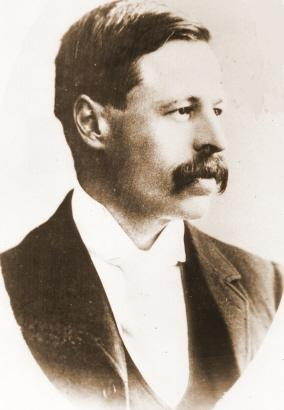
Charles Dealtry Locock

Charles Dealtry Locock (27 September 1862 – 13 May 1946) was a British literary scholar, editor and translator, who wrote on a wide array of subjects, including chess, billiards and croquet. He translated numerous Swedish plays and books of poetry.

== Life and career ==
Charles Dealtry Locock was born September 27, 1862, in Brighton, England. He was educated at Winchester College and Oxford University and then published several works on the romantic poet Percy Bysshe Shelley. He was a skilled chess player, winning the British Amateur Championship in 1887 and writing extensively on the game. From 1904 until 1915 he was the editor of the Croquet Association Gazette. Locock translated several Swedish authors, including the poets Esaias Tegnér and Gustaf Fröding and the playwright August Strindberg. His translation of the Strindberg play "The Dance of Death" was used in the 1969 film adaptation starring Laurence Olivier. He died May 13, 1946, in London.

C. D. Locock and his American contemporary, Charles Wharton Stork, published several volumes of Swedish poetry in translation. Among the authors they covered were Gustaf Fröding, Erik Axel Karlfeldt, Birger Sjöberg and August Strindberg.

== Selected works ==
- Side and Screw 1901
- Modern Croquet Tactics 1907
- Olympian Echoes 1908
- The Poems of Percy Bysshe Shelley 1911
- 120 Chess Problems and Puzzles 1912

== Selected translations ==
- Thirty-two passages from the Iliad 1922
- Thirty-two passages from the Odyssey 1923
- Fritiof's Saga by Esaias Tegnér 1924
- Guitar and Concertina by Gustaf Fröding 1925
- Modern Swedish Poetry Pt. 1 1929
- Easter and other plays by August Strindberg 1929
- Lucky Peter's Travels and other plays by August Strindberg 1930
- Master Olof and other plays by August Strindberg 1931
- Modern Swedish Poetry Pt. 2 1936
