= Passaic Flood =

The Passaic Flood in Northern New Jersey, in the Passaic river valley, began on October 9, 1903, and lasted through October 11. Slow-moving remnants of a tropical storm triggered the flood. 11.4 inches (290 mm) of rain fell within 24 hours on Paterson, New Jersey, which received over 15 inches (380 mm) of rain during the entire event. The Passaic River crested at 17.5 feet (5.3 m) at Little Falls, New Jersey. At the height of the flood, the Passaic river, which ordinarily carries 12,000 cubic feet of water per second, carried about 37,500 cubic feet of water per second. Other than the Passaic, three northern basin tributaries, the Ramapo, Wanaque, and Pequannock also experienced extreme flooding. The Rockaway and the Whippany rivers experienced less flooding. Bridges and dams along the Passaic and Ramapo Rivers were destroyed, including a 27-foot (8.2 m) dam at Pompton Lakes, New Jersey. Flooding encompassed 25 percent of Wallington, 20 percent of Passaic and 10.3 miles of Paterson streets. Additionally, 1,200 Paterson residents were displaced due to the flood. The flood, the most severe in the region since the American Colonial Period, caused $7 million in damage (equivalent to $250.8 million in 2025). The Edison Manufacturing Company produced a short documentary film, Flood Scene in Paterson, N.J., shot a few days after the flood. The flood still ranks as New Jersey's worst. It followed a similar course to the Passaic flood of 1902 that had occurred the prior year. The flood occurred on the Passaic floodplain, which was the site of an ancient lake. This massive lake formed 25,000 years ago after a glacier that covered northern New Jersey retreated. Water collected in this basin and a lake resided there for 2,000 years. At its largest, this lake was 30 miles long and 15 miles wide. The lake eventually drained through Great Notch, but this point has a high elevation so the lake took a long time to drain. The lake did not drain at a more efficient, lower-elevation point because the northward retreat of the Wisconsin glacier blocked the earlier, lower-elevation, drainage point. The slow drainage of the lake allowed time for a floodplain to form, increasing the flooding risk that continues today.
