= Mürzsteg =

- Former municipality
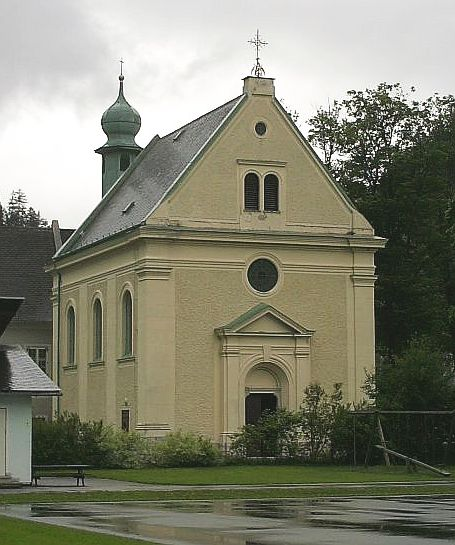
- Mürzsteg parish church

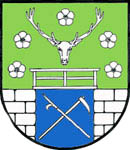
- Coat of arms

- Location within Austria
- Coordinates: 47°40′30″N 15°29′32″E
- Country: Austria
- State: Styria
- District: Bruck-Mürzzuschlag

Area
  - Total: 108.58 km^{2} (41.92 sq mi)
- Elevation: 782 m (2,566 ft)

Population (1 January 2016)
  - Total: 594
  - Density: 5.47/km^{2} (14.2/sq mi)
- Time zone: UTC+1 (CET)
  - Summer (DST): UTC+2 (CEST)
- Postal code: 8693
- Area code: 03859
- Vehicle registration: MZ
- Website: www.muerzsteg.at

Mürzsteg is a former municipality in the district of Bruck-Mürzzuschlag in the Austrian state of Styria. Since the 2015 Styria municipal structural reform, it is part of the municipality Neuberg an der Mürz.

== Culture and sightseeing ==
=== Museums ===
- Holzknechtmuseum

=== Buildings ===
- Mürzsteg Hunting Lodge: Originally a lodge of the Emperor of Austria, now a summer residence of the President of Austria. Not publicly accessible.

== Population ==
Historical population
Year	Pop.	±%
1869	1,398	—
1880	1,270	−9.2%
1890	1,317	+3.7%
1900	1,166	−11.5%
1910	1,125	−3.5%
1923	936	−16.8%
1934	943	+0.7%
1939	879	−6.8%
1951	1,099	+25.0%
1961	993	−9.6%
1971	813	−18.1%
1981	634	−22.0%
1991	652	+2.8%
2001	554	−15.0%
