= William Henry McCluskey =

William Henry McCluskey (18 June 1839 – 5 October 1903) was an Irish soldier and survivor of HMS Birkenhead after it was wrecked in 1852.

McCluskey was born in Armagh. In 1843 he emigrated with his parents to a farm near Cape Town. By the age of thirteen he had joined the Cape Mounted Rifles and was in this capacity aboard HMS Birkenhead, his unit being sent to fight in the war in the eastern province. According to an account of the incident:

"When the ship went down he swiftly got away from the wreck and being a powerful swimmer he struck out for the shore and after a time managed to join another soldier holding on to a floating spar. The waves threw them on to the rocks where they rested for a while then made for the shore which they reached bruised and bleeding. After recovery he was sent to serve in the Kaffir wars."

After the wars, he worked unsuccessfully in the gold and diamond fields. In 1877, he was commandeered into the Diamond Field Horse, where he gained the rank of sergeant. His last military action was as a member of the Beaconsfield Town Arms during the siege of Kimberley.

Retiring from the military, McCluskey worked for De Beers as a security guard, at Bultfontein. Here he was beaten to death in October 1903. Michael Mongale was found guilty of his murder but escaped the death penalty due to insanity, instead serving life.
