= Berc =

- Part of Les Monts-Verts
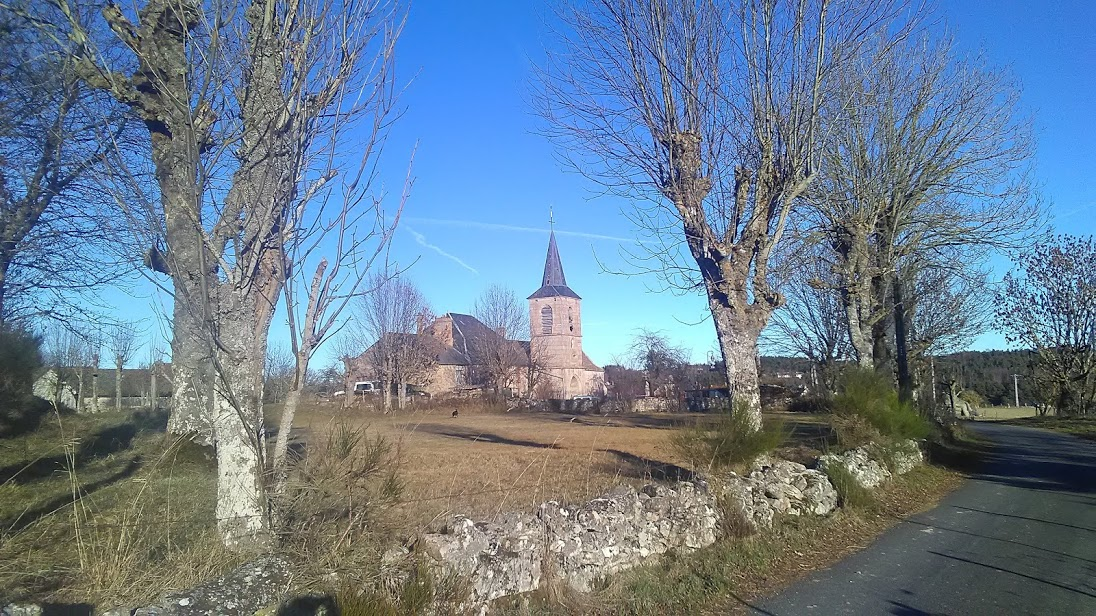
- Église Sainte-Marie de Berc
- Location of Berc
- Location within France Location within Occitanie
- Coordinates: 44°51′31″N 3°12′21″E
- Country: France
- Region: Occitania
- Department: Lozère
- Arrondissement: Mende
- Commune: Les Monts-Verts
- Elevation: 1,101 m (3,612 ft)
- Population (1968): 144
- Time zone: UTC+01:00 (CET)
  - Summer (DST): UTC+02:00 (CEST)
- Postal code: 48200
- Website: www.mairielesmontsverts.fr

Berc is a small village in the south of France. It is located in the department of Lozère, in the Massif Central, on the border with the department of Cantal, at an altitude of 1,101 metres (3,612 ft). In 1968 there were 144 inhabitants.

An independent commune until 1 January 1973, Berc now forms the new commune of Les Monts-Verts with the villages of Arcomie and Le Bacon.

== History ==
Berc was created in 1877 from the communes of Arcomie, La Fage-Saint-Julien and Termes. On 1 January 1973, it merged with two communes, Arcomie and Le Bacon, to form the new commune named Les Monts-Verts.

The town was known at the beginning of the twentieth century for its artisanal production of sabots.

== Local culture and heritage ==
=== Places and monuments ===
- Église Sainte-Marie de Berc.
- Cross near the church of Sainte-Marie.
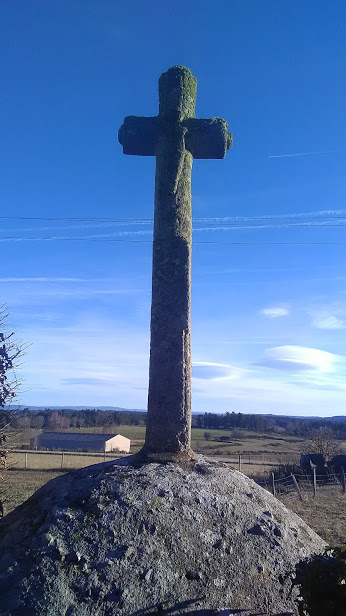
Ancient cross.

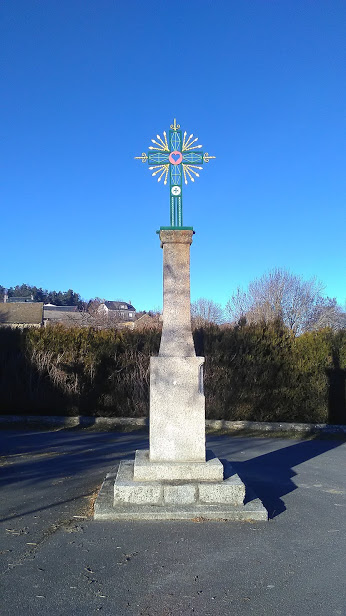
Modern cross.

=== Personalities ===
- Pierre Veyron (1903-1970), Grand Prix motor racing driver, was born in Berc. Bugatti Automobiles named one of its models, the Bugatti Veyron, after him.

== See also ==
- Les Monts-Verts
