= Flying Machines Which Do Not Fly =

1903 New York Times editorial

"Flying Machines Which Do Not Fly" is an editorial published in the New York Times on October 9, 1903. The article incorrectly predicted it would take one million to ten million years for humanity to develop an operating flying machine. It was written in response to Samuel Langley's failed airplane experiment two days prior. Sixty-nine days after the article's publication, American brothers Orville and Wilbur Wright successfully achieved the first heavier-than-air flight on December 17, 1903, at Kitty Hawk, North Carolina.

== Background ==
By the beginning of the twentieth century, popular opinion regarded air travel as impossible. Contemporary engineers and scientists were also pessimistic about flight. Notable critics included Simon Newcomb, Lord Kelvin, and the chief engineer of the US Navy, George W. Melville, the latter of whom described flying machines as "wholly unwarranted, if not absurd". After five years of preparations, aviation pioneer Samuel Langley was ready to test out his Aerodrome on October 7, 1903. Piloted by Charles Manly, the aircraft failed to fly and dropped into the Potomac River immediately after launch.

== Article ==
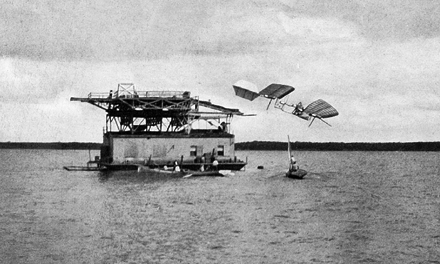
First failure of Samuel Langley's manned Aerodrome, Potomac River, October 7, 1903

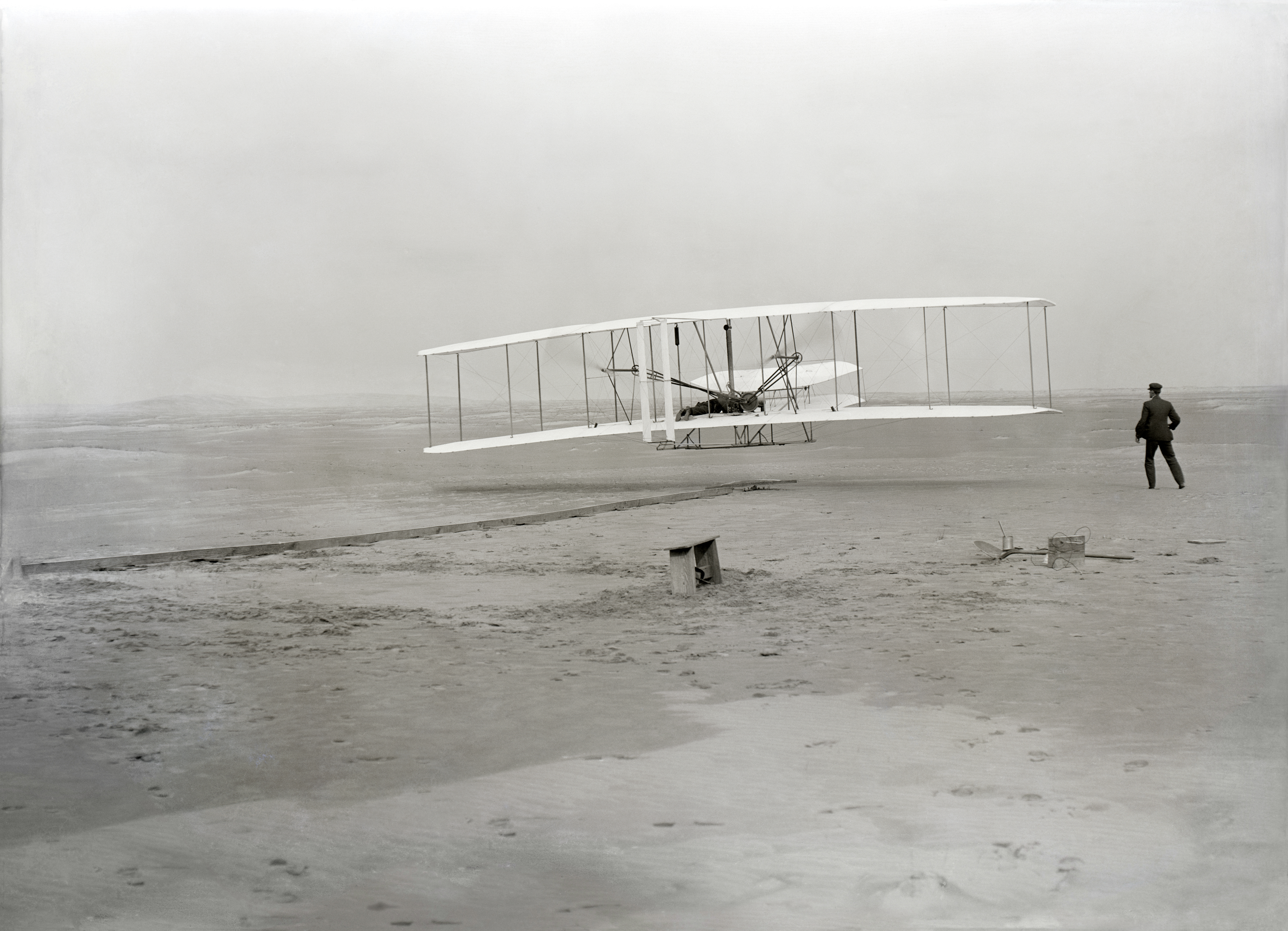
Seconds into the Wright brothers' successful airplane flight, near Kitty Hawk, North Carolina, on December 17, 1903

The failure of the Aerodrome resulted in public ridicule of Langley. Two days after the failed experiment, the editorial "Flying Machines Which Do Not Fly" was published in the New York Times. It opined:

[It] might be assumed that the flying machine which will really fly might be evolved by the combined and continuous efforts of mathematicians and mechanicians in from one million to ten million years... No doubt the problem has attractions for those it interests, but to the ordinary man it would seem as if effort might be employed more profitably.

On the same day as the published article, Orville Wright wrote in his diary, "We started assembly today", in reference to the first airplane that he and his brother, Wilbur, would fly shortly thereafter. On December 8, 1903 Langley made a final attempt to fly his Aerodrome. Once again, the experiment failed and official support for Langley's project was withdrawn. Another New York Times editorial commented:

We hope that Professor Langley will not put his substantial greatness as a scientist in further peril by continuing to waste his time and money for further airship experiments. Life is short, and he is capable of services to humanity incomparably greater than can expected to result from trying to fly ...

On December 17, 1903, the Wright brothers disproved the New York Times—and many other doubters—with the successful flight of their airplane.

== Legacy ==
Astronaut Dave Williams regards the article as "perhaps the most infamous bad prediction of all time". Political scientist P. W. Singer notes the article as his favorite example of a "completely and utterly wrong" prediction.

American President George W. Bush referenced the New York Times article during the centennial celebration of the Wright brothers' historic flight in December 2003.

== See also ==
- Claims to the first powered flight
- List of The New York Times controversies
