= Mürzsteg Agreement =

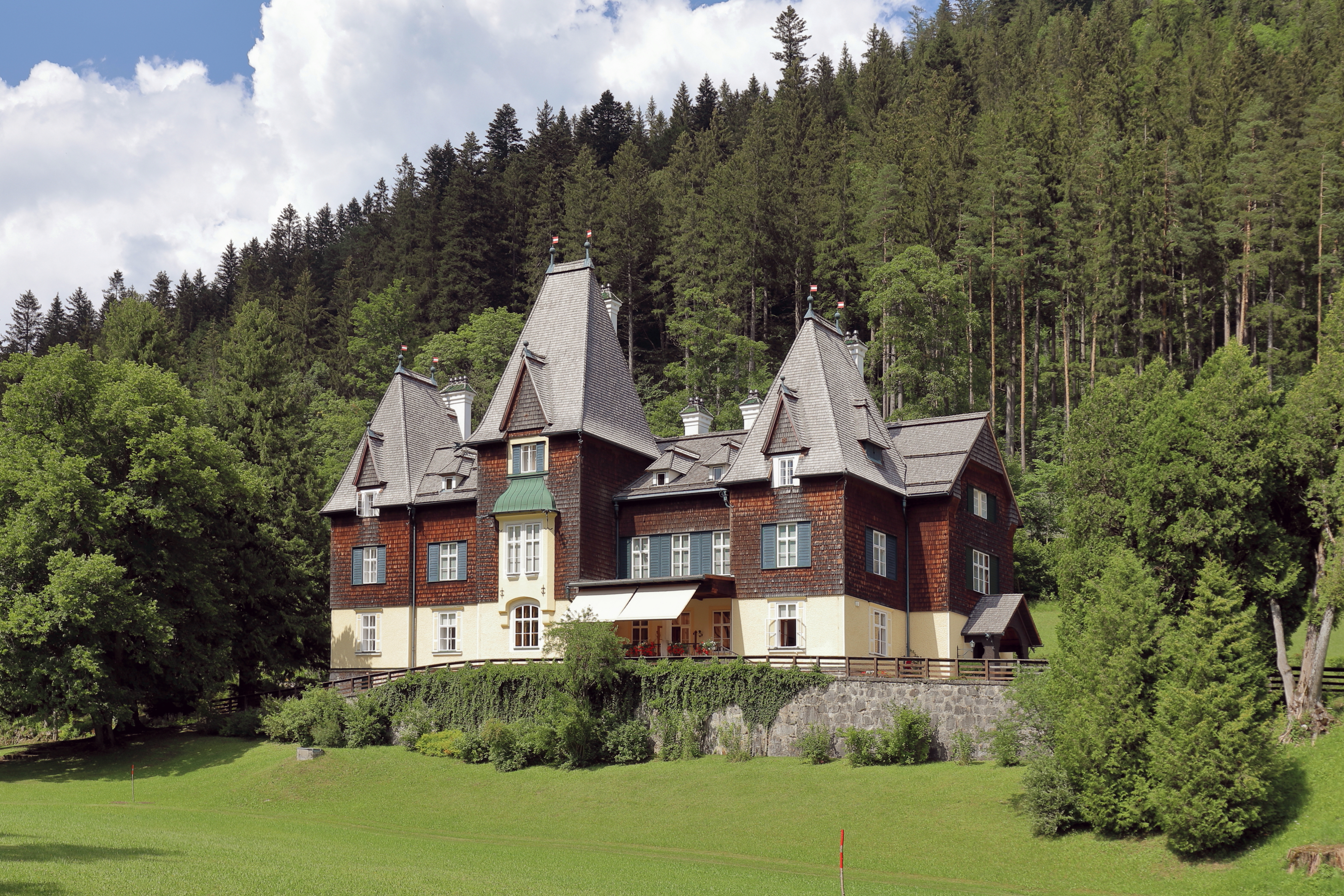
The Austrian Jagdschloss Mürzsteg (Mürzsteg Hunting Lodge), where the agreement was signed.

The Mürzsteg Agreement, signed 2 October 1903 at the Mürzsteg Hunting Lodge, was a joint memorandum of Russia and the Austro-Hungarian Empire transmitted to the Ottoman Empire, which proposed a series of political reforms in the vilayets of Thessaloniki, Kosovo and Monastir. The purpose of these reforms was to maintain the integrity of the Ottoman state, threatened by the IMRO-led Ilinden–Preobrazhenie Uprising, and to procure greater rights for Christians living under it. The Ottoman Empire agreed to the proposed reforms on 24 November.

In the spring of 1902, Bulgaria, an Ottoman vassal state which was interested in acquiring Macedonia, signed a military convention with Russia. Late in the fall, Russia, supported by the United Kingdom and France, proposed political reforms for the Macedonian vilayets to the Ottomans. On 8 December, Ottoman sultan Abdul Hamid II signed a decree implementing most of the reforms. In February 1903, the new Russian foreign minister Vladimir Lamsdorf visited Vienna and signed the so-called "Vienna Program" on Macedonian reforms. The program was substantially the same as the Ottoman decree of December. The immediate cause of a new agreement at Mürzsteg was the Ilinden–Preobrazhenie Uprising that broke out on 2 August. With its quick suppression, the Vienna Program lay dead.

In September Tsar Nicholas II of Russia visited the Emperor Francis Joseph of Austria-Hungary at the latter's castle in Mürzsteg, Austria. The two rulers put their signatures to a new memorandum which was substantially identical to the Vienna Program and called for the appointment of one Russian and one Austro-Hungarian civil agent to oversee the reform of the administration, judiciary and local gendarmerie in the Macedonian vilayets. In all these institutions Christians were to take part. After Abdul Hamid accepted the proposal in November, Russia appointed one N. Demerik as its agent, and Austria chose one G. Müller. They began their work under Hüseyin Hilmi Pasha, the Inspector-General of Macedonia, in early 1904. Under the Mürzsteg program, each Great Power appointed an advisory official to the Ottoman official in charge of reforming the gendarmerie in each province. Austria-Hungary appointed an advisor to the sanjak of Üsküp, Russia to the sanjak of Thessaloniki, France to the sanjak of Siroz and Britain to the sanjak of Drama.

After defeat in the Russo-Japanese War (1904–05), Russia lost much of her influence in the Balkans. Austria-Hungary refused to back judicial reforms in 1907 and Ottoman officials resisted financial reforms. In 1908, the sultan approved the construction of a railway from Mitrovica to Thessaloniki, which favoured Austria-Hungary and was in violation of the Mürzsteg Agreement. The agreement was officially cancelled when the Ottoman government received permission to shut down the Commission for International Financial Control in Macedonia in May 1909.

== Sources ==
- Akhund, Nadine (2009). "Muslim Representation in the Three Ottoman vilayets of Macedonia: Administration and Military Power (1878–1908)". Journal of Muslim Minority Affairs. 29 (4): 443–54. doi:10.1080/13602000903411358. S2CID 144536694.
- Brooks, Julian (2014). Managing Macedonia: British Statecraft, Intervention, and 'Proto-peacekeeping' in Ottoman Macedonia, 1902–1905 (PhD thesis). Simon Fraser University.
- Gerd, Lora (2014). Russian Policy in the Orthodox East: The Patriarchate of Constantinople (1878–1914). De Gruyter.
- Helmreich, E. C.; Black, C. E. (1937). "The Russo-Bulgarian Military Convention of 1902". Journal of Modern History. 9 (4): 471–82. doi:10.1086/243466. S2CID 143540184.
