= Franz Xaver von Pausinger =

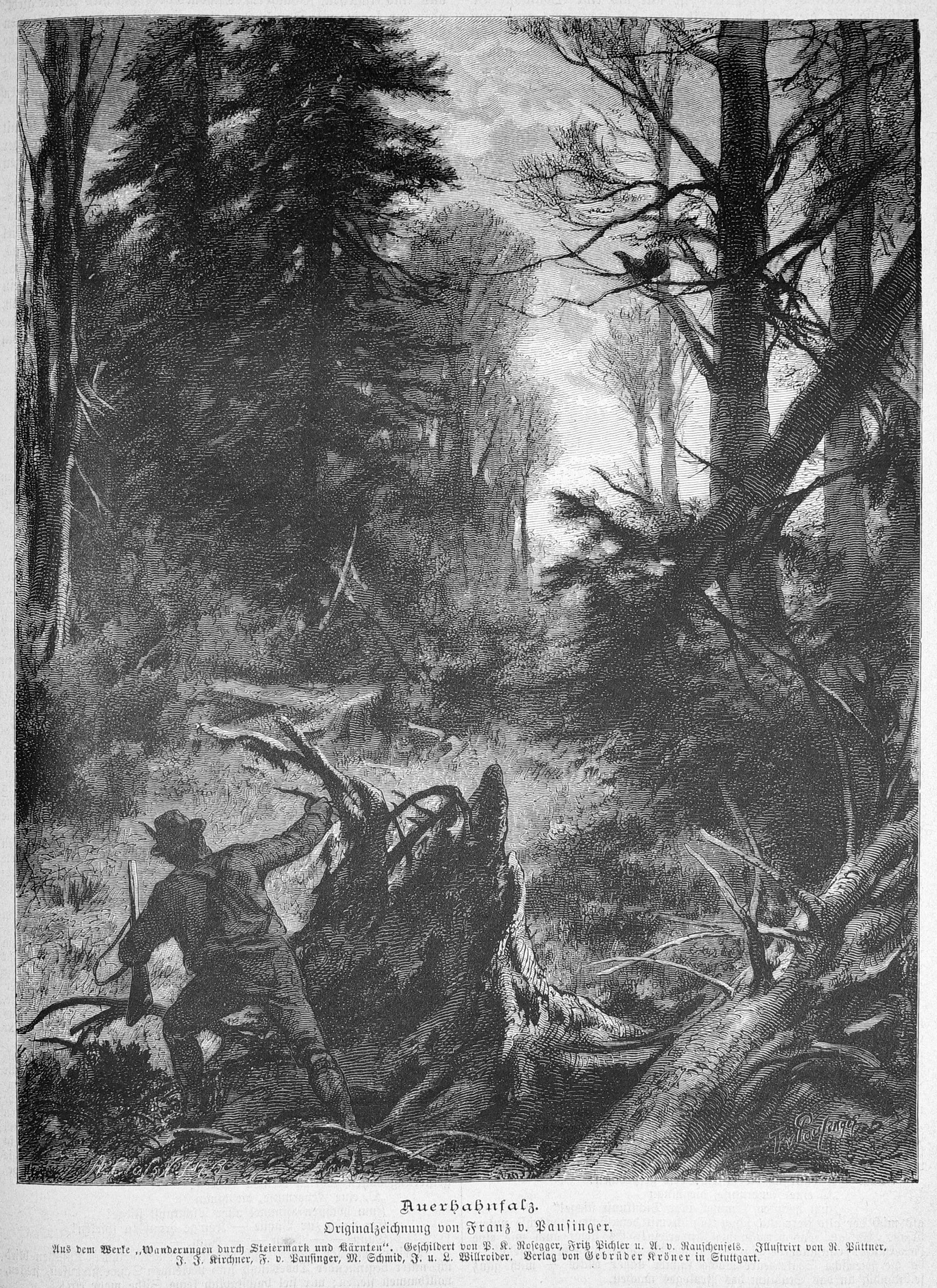
Auerhahnbalz (Courting of the Wood Grouse)

Franz Xaver von Pausinger (10 February 1839 – 7 April 1915) was an Austrian landscape and animal painter. He was born and died in Salzburg.

== Background ==
Franz Xaver von Pausinger spent his childhood in Schloss Frein in Frankenburg am Hausruck. He attended the Volksschule there and later the Realschule in Salzburg. He was trained as an academic painter in Karlsruhe and Zürich.

After gaining fame as an illustrator, he accompanied Crown Prince Rudolf of Austria on a trip to the East. He was also occupied as an illustrator in Vienna and Munich. He lived in Salzburg, with a home and studio in Schloss Elsenheim.

He married Rosalia Hinterhuber, the daughter of a pharmacist. He was buried in a grave of honor at the Salzburger Kommunalfriedhof. In 1915, the Salzburg street Pausingerstraße was named after him. In 1920 the Pausingergasse in Penzing was also named after him. Substantial parts of his legacy are owned by the Salzburg Museum and the Austrian National Library.

== Literature (in German) ==
- A. Rohrmoser: "Pausinger, Franz August von". In: Österreichisches Biographisches Lexikon 1815–1950 (ÖBL). Vol. 7, Austrian Academy of Sciences, Vienna 1978, ISBN 3-7001-0187-2, p. 357.
- Nikolaus Schaffer: Franz von Pausinger - ein Anachronismus? Salzburger Museumsblätter, 76. Jahrgang, Nr. 6, Juli 2015.
- Marlies Dornig: "My whole concept of the world has changed". Der Tier- und Jagdmaler Franz von Pausinger auf neuen künstlerischen Wegen anlässlich der Orientreise des Kronprinzen Rudolf von 1881, Univ. Diss., Wien 2016.
