= List of Fredman's Epistles =

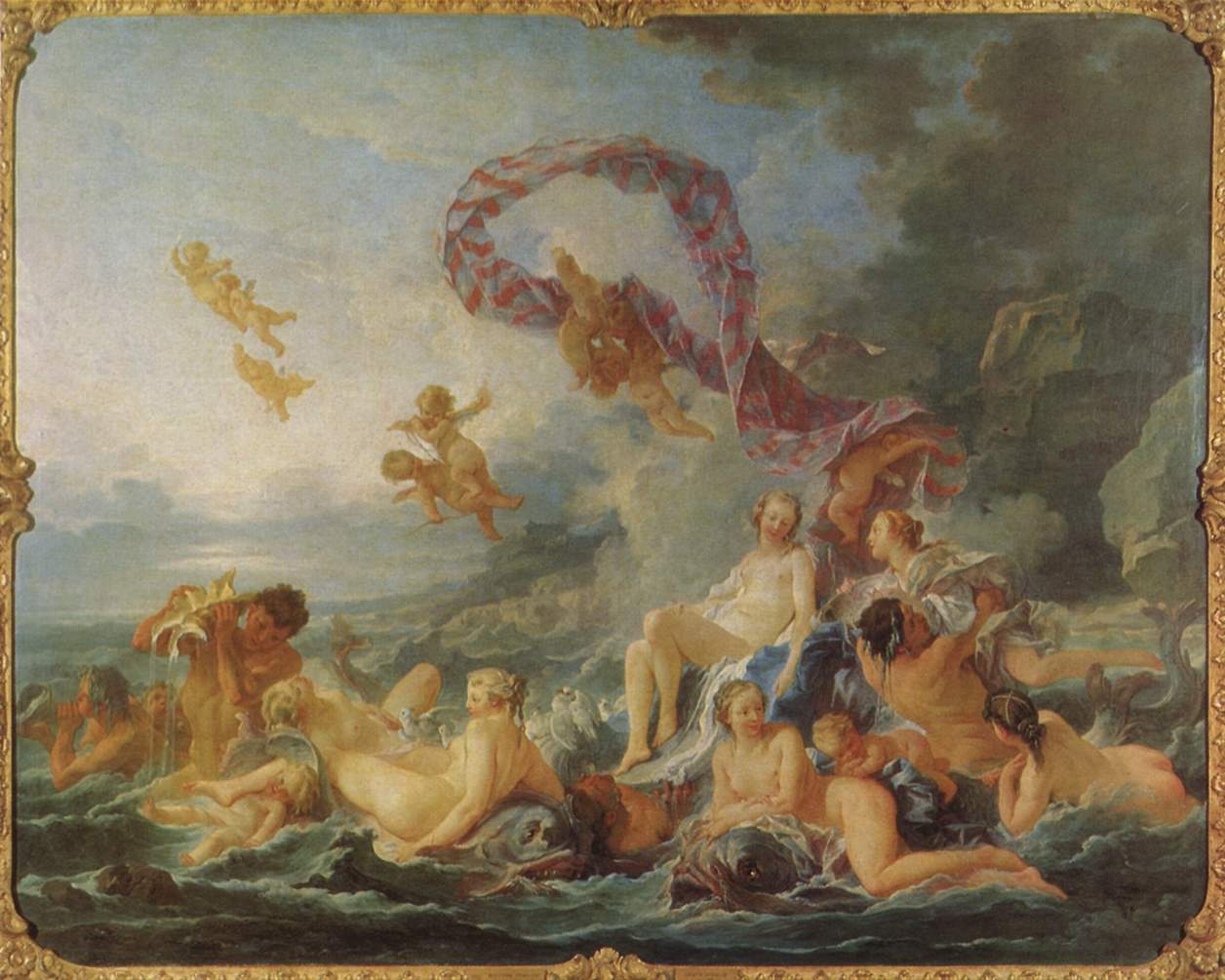
François Boucher's 1740 painting Triumph of Venus, the Rococo influence on Carl Michael Bellman's Fredman's Epistles, written from 1760 onwards and published in 1790

Fredman's Epistles is a collection of 82 songs by the dominant figure in Swedish 18th century song, Carl Michael Bellman, first published in 1790. It was created over a period of twenty years from 1768 onwards. A companion volume, Fredman's Songs was published the following year.

The songs in Fredman's Epistles vary widely in style and effect, from Rococo-themed pastorale with a cast of gods and demigods from classical antiquity to laments for the effects of Brännvin-drinking; lively tavern-scenes, apparent improvisations skilfully crafted. The lyrics describe a gallery of fictional and semi-fictional characters and events taking place in Stockholm of that era, based on the lives of actual people Bellman was aware of. Jean Fredman, an alcoholic former watchmaker, is the central character and fictional narrator. Ulla Winblad, based on one of Bellman's friends, is the chief of the fictional "nymphs", half goddess, half prostitute, of the demimonde characters of Fredman's Epistles. Many of the songs have remained culturally significant in Scandinavia, especially in Sweden.

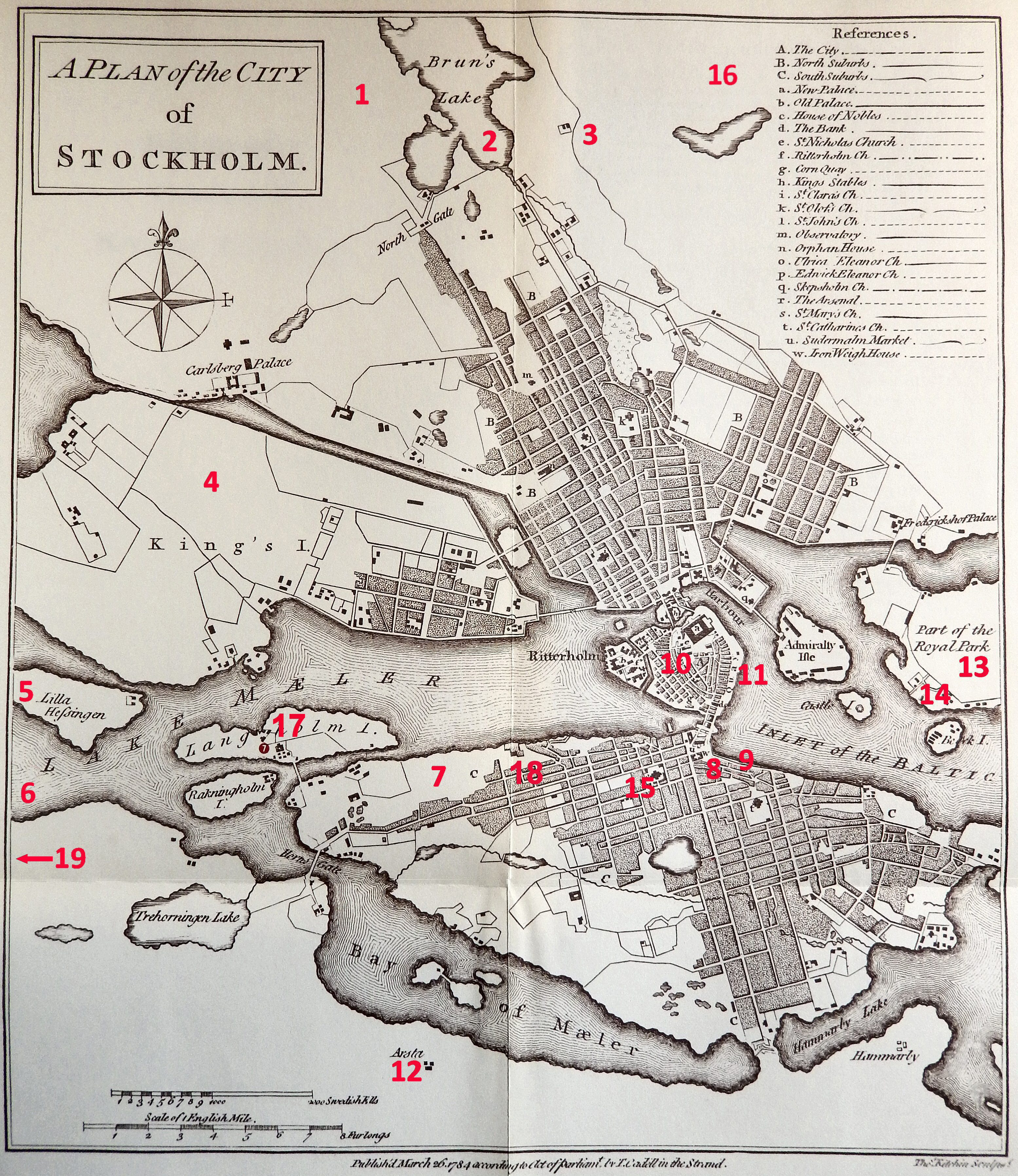
Map of Bellman's Stockholm, places of interest for his Fredman's Epistles and Songs on map from William Coxe's Travels into Poland, Russia, Sweden, and Denmark, 1784. 1 Haga park (S. 64) – 2 Brunnsviken – 3 Första Torpet (Ep. 80) – 4 Kungsholmen – 5 Hessingen (Ep. 48) – 6 Lake Mälaren (Ep. 48) – 7 Södermalm – 8 Urvädersgränd – 9 Lokatten tavern (Ep. 11, Ep. 59, Ep. 77), Bruna Dörren tavern (Ep. 24, Ep. 38) – 10 Gamla stan (Ep. 5, Ep. 9, Ep. 23, Ep. 28, Ep. 79) – 11 Skeppsbron Quay (Ep. 33) – 12 Årsta Castle – 13 Djurgården Park – (Ep. 25, Ep. 51, Ep. 82) – 14 Gröna Lund (Ep. 12, Ep. 62) – 15 Bellman's birthplace – 16 Fiskartorpet (Ep. 71) – 17 Lilla Sjötullen (Bellmanmuseet) (Ep. 48) – 18 Bensvarvars tavern (Ep. 40) 19 Rostock tavern (Ep. 45)

They are widely sung and recorded, by amateur choirs and professional singers alike. The Orphei Drängar are a choir named for a phrase in Epistle 14, and set up to perform Bellman's works; they give concerts around the world. Several professional solo singers in the Swedish ballad tradition largely made their name in the 1960s singing Bellman, while accompanying themselves in Bellmanesque style with a guitar. They were the members of the "Storks" artistic community ("Vispråmen Storken") in Stockholm, and they include Fred Åkerström (1937–1985) with his albums Fred sjunger Bellman, Glimmande nymf and Vila vid denna källa, and Cornelis Vreeswijk with his albums Spring mot Ulla, spring! and Movitz! Movitz!. Other singers such as Sven-Bertil Taube and William Clauson used the less authentic accompaniment of an ensemble; Clauson was also the first to release a recording of Bellman in English, alongside his Swedish recordings. Singers from other traditions sometimes sing Bellman; for example, the folk singer Sofia Karlsson and the popular musician Cajsa Grytt. Over 500 recordings of Bellman's Fredman's Epistles or Fredman's Songs have been placed on YouTube.

Among the best known of Fredman's Epistles are: No. 2, Nå skruva Fiolen, No. 3, Fader Berg i hornet stöter, No. 7, Fram med basfiolen, knäpp och skruva, No. 12, Gråt Fader Berg och spela, No. 23, Ach du min Moder!, described as "the to-be-or-not-to-be of Swedish literature"; No. 28, I går såg jag ditt barn, min Fröja, No. 33, Stolta Stad!, No. 35, Bröderna fara väl vilse ibland; No. 36, Vår Ulla låg i sängen och sov, a poem of "immeasurable artistry, balance, and subtlety of effect"; No. 40, Ge rum i Bröllops-gåln din hund!, "one of the wildest weddings in Swedish literature"; No. 48, Solen glimmar blank och trind; No. 63, Fader Bergström; No. 71, Ulla! min Ulla! säj får jag dig bjuda; No. 72, Glimmande nymf; No. 80, Liksom en Herdinna, högtids klädd; No. 81, Märk hur vår skugga; and No. 82, the last, Hvila vid denna källa.

== List of Fredman's Epistles ==
Each of the 82 epistles is listed here with its number and its original descriptive title or dedication. The contemporary Gustavian age cast of characters is listed under "Mortals"; the classical and Nordic gods and demigods (and in one Epistle, a cast of Old Testament heroes) are listed under "Immortals".

Epistles
Number	First line	Dedication	Theme	Mortals	Immortals	Location, notes
1	Gutår, båd natt och dag	Til Cajsa Stina	Drink	Cajsa Stina, Jergen Puckel, Benjamin Schwalbe, Eric Bergström, Anders Wingmark, broder Berg, Christian Samuel Bredström		
2	Nå skruva Fiolen	Til Fader Berg, rörande Fiolen	Tavern, Fiddle	Fader Berg, Fredman	Bacchus	
3	Fader Berg i hornet stöter	Til en och hvar af Systrarna, men enkannerligen till Ulla Winblad	Wine, Women, Song, Horn	Fader Berg, Jergen Puckel, Ulla Winblad	Charon, Paris, Helen, Freya	Introduces Ulla Winblad
4	Hej Musikanter ge Valdthornen väder	Enkannerligen till Anna Stina	Wine, Women, Song	Anna Stina	Bacchus, Freya	
5	Käre bröder, så låtom oss supa i frid	Til de trogne Bröder på Terra Nova i Gaffelgränden	Drink, Companions		Bacchus	Terra Nova Tavern in Gaffelgränden by Skeppsbron
6	Käraste Bröder Systrar och Vänner	Til de Galimater på hinsidon den Konungsliga Djurgårdenom	Wine, Women, Song	Ulla Winblad		Djurgården
7	Fram med basfiolen, knäpp och skruva	Som synes vara en Elegie, skriven vid Ulla Winblads säng, sent om aftonen	Muse	Ulla Winblad, Fader Berg	Freya	
8	Dörrarna öpna, Fiolerna klara!	Til Corporal Mollberg	Wine, Women, Song	Mollberg		Introduces Mollberg
9	Käraste Bröder, Systrar och Vänner	Till gumman på Thermopolium Boreale	Wine, Women, Song	Fader Berg, Jergen Puckel, Jungfru Lona	Bacchus	
10	Systrar hören min musik	Klingar väl vid flöjttraver	Wine, Women, Song		Bacchus, Cupid	
11	Hej! sade Fredman hvar gång han hörde Valdthorn börja skråla	Til Bröderne och Systrarna på Lokatten	Wine, Women, Song	Ulla Winblad	Cupid	Lokatten (Lynx Tavern); Begins "Portugal, Spanien,/ Stora Britannien"
12	Gråt Fader Berg och spela	Elegi öfver slagsmålet på Gröna Lund	Drink, violence	Jergen Puckel		Gröna Lund (The Greenwood Tavern)
13	Nå ä nu alla församlade här	Till Brodern Bredström	Drink, Companions	Bredström brothers, Anders Wingmark, Benjamin Schwalbe, Jergen Puckel	Cupid	
14	Hör J Orphei Drängar	Till poeten Wetz	Drink, Companions	"Orpheus's servants"	Apollo, Bacchus, Cupid, Venus/Freya	
15	Käraste min Theophile	Enkannerligen til Theophilum Skomakar-Gesäll, under dess förföljelse skrifven til tröst och hugsvalelse	Drink, Companions	Theophile	Bacchus	
16	Fader Bergström fingra ditt Oboe, blås	Enkannerligen til de Birfilare på den Konungsliga Djurgården	Drink, Companions	Fader Bergström, Cajsa		Djurgården
17	Systrar och Vänner	Til Syster Lisa	Drink, Companions	Lisa, Jergen Puckel		
18	Gubbarna satt sig at dricka	Til Gubbarna på Terra Nova i Gaffelgränden vid Skeppsbron	Drink, Companions	Jergen Puckel, Benjamin		Terra Nova Tavern in Gaffelgränden by Skeppsbron
19	Trumslagarn kommer, flickor god dag!	Til Systrarna på den Konungsliga Djurgården	Wine, Women, Song	Fader Berg		Djurgården
20	Står du och gråter?	Til Fader Berg och Jergen Puckel	Dance	Fader Berg, Jergen Puckel	Bacchus	
21	Skyarna tjockna	Varutinnan han 1:0 avmålar natten med dess nöjen, 2:0 tyckes liksom för ögonen ställa ett slags aequilibrium emellan vinets och kärlekens styrka, men omsider ljusligen uppenbarar övervikten	Wine, Women, Song	Fader Berg		
22	Glasen darra mellan knogen	Til de Nybyggare på Gröna Lund	Drink			Gröna Lund (The Greenwood Tavern)
23	Ack du min Moder!	Som är ett soliloquium, då Fredman låg vid krogen Kryp-in, gent emot bankohuset, en sommarnatt år 1768	Drink	Fredman		Krogen Kryp-In (The Crawl-in Tavern), Järntorget 85, Gamla stan
24	Kära Syster!	Till kära mor på Bruna Dörren	Drink		Bacchus	Bruna Dörren (The Brown Door Tavern)
25	Blåsen nu alla	Som är ett försök till en pastoral i bacchanalisk smak, skriven vid Ulla Winblads överfart till Djurgården	Pastorale	Ulla Winblad	Neptune, Venus/Freya, Zephyrs, water nymphs, Tritons, Palaemon	Water crossing to Djurgården
26	Hvar står Fiolen?	Rörande mutter Berg och angående Lotta i Kolmätargränden och vad som passerat	Drink, Violence	mutter Berg, Lotta		
27	Gubben är gammal, urverket dras	Som är dess sista tankar	Drink, Death	Movitz	Bacchus, Freya	
28	I går såg jag ditt barn, min Fröja	Om ett anställt försåt emot Ulla Winblad	Muse	Ulla Winblad	Freya, Themis	Yxsmedsgränd
29	Movitz tag dina pinnar	Till de förnäma	Loss	Movitz	Freya	
30	Drick ur ditt glas, se Döden på dig väntar	Till fader Movitz, under dess sjukdom, lungsoten. Elegi	Drink, Death	Movitz	Bacchus, Freya	
31	Se Movitz, hvi står du och gråter	Över Movitz, då han blev uppiskad på gatan, för det kvinten sprang på basfiolen, en sommarafton 1769	Violence	Movitz		
32	Kors! utan glas, du ser ut, din Canalje	Till fader Movitz, varutinnan han liknar honom vid ett skepp	Drink	Movitz		
33	Was ist das? / Stolta Stad!	1:0 Om fader Movitz' överfart till Djurgården och 2:0 om den dygdiga Susanna	Life	Movitz		Djurgården
34	Ack hvad för en usel koja!	Till Movitz, när elden var lös i hans kvarter uti Kolmätargränden	Disaster	Movitz	Charon, Themis	Kolmätargränden
35	Bröderna fara väl vilse ibland	Angående sin sköna och hennes obeständighet	Loss	Movitz	Freya	
36	Vår Ulla låg i sängen och sov	Rörande Ulla Winblads flykt	Muse	Ulla Winblad	Apollo, Astrild, Bacchus, Freya	
37	Mollberg, stå stilla, stå stilla vid grind	Till Mollberg på post vid Kungsträdgården	Music, Life	Mollberg, Bergström	Flora, Orpheus	Kungsträdgården
38	Undan ur vägen	Rörande Mollbergs paradering vid korporal Bomans grav	Death	Mollberg, Christian Wingmark, Corporal Boman		
39	Storm och böljor tystna ren	Öfver Bergströmskans Porträt på Liljans krog				
40	Ge rum i Bröllops-gåln din hund!	Angående bröllopet hos Bensvarvars	Wine, Women, Song	Movitz		A chaotic wedding at Bensvarvars
41	Mollberg satt i paulun	Vid et tilfälle då Christian Wingmark miste sin nattkappa i Slagsmålet med Mollberg	Drink, Violence	Christian Wingmark, Mollberg		
42	Ren Calas jag spår och tror	Rörande Kortspelet på Klubben	Cards	Mollberg, mor Wingmark, Ulla Winblad		The club, Mälaren
43	Värm mer Öl och Bröd	Til Ulla Winblad, skrifven vid et ömt tilfälle	Muse	Ulla Winblad	Astrild	The birthing-room
44	Movitz helt allena	Öfver Bredströmskans och Movitz melancholi	Wine, Women, Song	Movitz	Astrild, Bacchus, Chloris, Freya	
45	Tjenare Mollberg, hur är det fatt?	Till fader Mollberg rörande hans harpa	Drink, Violence	Mollberg	Apollo, Bacchus, Maecenas, Venus	
46	Undan ur vägen, ge rum för Courirn	Huru Mollberg skal bjuda til begrafning efter Mutter på Krogen Wismar, och om hans avfärd ifrån Sterbhuset		Mollberg		Wismar Tavern
47	Kommer intet Mollberg? Jo nyss på stund	Angående Mollbergs återkomst til Sterbhuset på Krogen Wismar		Mollberg		Wismar Tavern
48	Solen glimmar blank och trind	Hvaruti afmålas Ulla Winblads hemresa från Hessingen i Mälaren en sommarmorgon 1769	Pastorale	Ulla Winblad, Movitz	Neptune	Lake Mälaren back to Stockholm
49	Mamsell Ulla, märk Mamsell	Angående Landstigningen vid Klubben i Mälaren en sommar-afton 1769	Pastorale	Ulla Winblad, Mollberg	Bacchus	The club, Mälaren
50	Phoebus förnyar	Om des sista Ögnekast på Ulla Winblad vid Hännes återfart ifrån Djurgården	Pastorale, Rococo	Ulla Winblad, Movitz	Jupiter, Neptune, Pan, Cupids, Freya	Return from Djurgården
51	Movitz blåste en Concert	Angående Concerten på Tre Byttor	Wine, Women, Song	Movitz, Ulla Winblad, Wingmark, Bergström, Berg	Eol, Neptune, Orpheus	Tre Byttor Tavern
52	Movitz, mitt hjerta blöder!	Til Movitz när hans Fästmö dog. Elegie	Death	Movitz, his wife Charlotte	Cupid, Freya	
53	Vid et stop Öl och några Supar	Angående Slagsmålet nedanför Danto-Bommen hos T. en höstnatt	Drink, Violence			Near the Danto Barrier
54	Aldrig en Iris på dessa bleka fält	På St. Cathrina Kyrkogård		Corporal Boman, Movitz	Flora	St. Catherine's Churchyard
55	Så ser Han ut midt bland de strålar	Rörande Movitz Kägelspel hos Faggens vid Hammarby-Tull en sommar afton 1770		Mollberg	Faggens Tavern by Hammarby Toll	
56	Se Mollberg med svart Råck och Flor	Angående Mor Maja på Förgylda Bägaren		Mollberg, Movitz	Astrild, Clotho, Freya	Golden Beaker Tavern
57	Allting är rigtigt clareradt och gjordt	Om Barnsölet		Mollberg		
58	Hjertat mig klämmer	Öfver Kilberg, Bacchi man och Ordens Officiant i Templet			Charon	
59	Hurra Courage, Bagage! God dag Bröder!	Til Lo-Katten	Drinking		Freya	Lokatten (Lynx Tavern)
60	Sitter du ännu och ljuger	Til Bränvins-Advocaten Fader Kulkus om något som passerat		Cajsa Wingmark	Freya, Themis	
61	Kära Mor!	Til K. Mor på Fyrkanten		Movitz		Fyrkanten Tavern
62	Movitz Valdthornet proberar	Angående sista Balen på Gröna Lund		Movitz, Christian Wingmark	Bible: David and Goliath, Ahasuerus, Esther, Noah	Gröna Lund pleasure gardens
63	Fader Bergström, stäm up och klinga	Diktad midt i veckan	Dance, Drinking	Fader Bergström, Fredman		
64	Fäll dina ögon och skäms nu din tåssa	Rörande sista Balen hos Frömans i Horns-Kroken		Movitz	Freya	Horns-Kroken Tavern
65	Movitz med flor om armen, hålt!	Om Styrmans-Dottren Gretgens död på Fabriken		Movitz, Gretgen	Charon, Freya	
66	Se hvar Movitz sitter där	Til Movitz Målare		Movitz	Freya, Astrild	
67	Fader Movitz, Bror!	Til Mutter på Tuppen	Wine, Women, Song	Movitz	Freya	Tuppen (The Cock Tavern)
68	Movitz, i afton står Baln	Angående sista balen på Grönlund	Wine, Women, Song	Movitz, madam Wingmark	Bacchus, Chloris	Grönlund Tavern
69	Se Dansmästarn Mollberg, Bröder	Om Mollberg Dansmästare	Dance, Life	Mollberg, Ulla Winblad		
70	Movitz vik mössan högt öfver öra	Om något som passerade i Artilleri-Lägret Anno 1773		Movitz, Ulla Winblad		
71	Ulla! min Ulla! säj får jag dig bjuda	Till Ulla i fönstret på Fiskartorpet	Pastorale	Ulla Winblad		Fiskartorpet
72	Glimmande Nymf! blixtrande öga!	Lämnad vid Cajsa Lisas säng, sent om en afton	Muse	Cajsa Lisa	Freya, Jupiter	
73	Fan i Fauteuillerna! stolarna kullra	Angående Jergen som förskref sig til Fan	Drink, Life	Movitz		
74	Min Son!	Om Bergströmskans Porträt		Movitz		
75	Skratta mina barn och vänner	Til sin Rival Fader Movitz, på Cajsa Lisas Namnsdag		Movitz, Cajsa Lisa		
76	Se Hans Jergen hur han sig bockar	Til Mutter på Wismar, rörande Hans Jergen, då han blev utpiskad ifrån Balen		Hans Jergen		Wismar Tavern
77	Klang mina Flickor! se skyarna glimma	Angående Jungfru Sophia på Lokatten och om något som passerat		Fredman, Mollberg	Bacchus	Lokatten (Lynx Tavern)
78	Knapt Jeppe hant ur gluggen gå in	som är et Fägne-Spel på Fader Didriks Namnsdag år 1780				
79	Charon i Luren tutar	Afsked til Matronorna, synnerligen til Mor Maja Myra i Solgränden vid Stortorget, Anno 1785	Death	Mor Maja Myra	Charon, Eolus	Solgränden by Stortorget
80	Liksom en Herdinna, högtids klädd	Angående Ulla Winblads Lustresa til Första Torpet, utom Kattrumps Tullen	Pastorale	Ulla Winblad, Mollberg	Flora, Jupiter	Första Torpet, outside Kattrump Tollgate
81	Märk hur vår skugga, märk Movitz Mon Frère!	Til Grälmakar Löfberg i Sterbhuset vid Danto bommen	Death	Grälmakar Löfberg, Movitz	Charon	Sterbhuset by Danto Barrier
82	Hvila vid denna källa	Eller Oförmodade Afsked, förkunnadt vid Ulla Winblads Frukost en sommar-morgon i det gröna	Pastorale	Ulla Winblad, Fredman	Bacchus, Clotho, Charon, Eolus, Freya	

== Sources ==
- Bellman, Carl Michael (1790). Fredmans epistlar. Stockholm: By Royal Privilege.
- Britten Austin, Paul (1967). The Life and Songs of Carl Michael Bellman: Genius of the Swedish Rococo. New York: Allhem, Malmö American-Scandinavian Foundation. ISBN 978-3-932759-00-0.
- Britten Austin, Paul (1999) [1990]. Fredman's Epistles and Songs. Stockholm: Proprius.
- Burman, Carina (2019). Bellman. Biografin [Bellman. The Biography]. Stockholm: Albert Bonniers Förlag. ISBN 978-9100141790.
- Hassler, Göran; Dahl, Peter (illus.) (1989). Bellman – en antologi [Bellman – an anthology]. En bok för alla. ISBN 91-7448-742-6. (contains the most popular Epistles and Songs, in Swedish, with sheet music)
- Hassler, Göran; Dahl, Peter (illus.) (1989a). Bellman II – en antologi [Bellman – an anthology]. En bok för alla. ISBN 91-7448-837-6. (contains the most popular Epistles and Songs, in Swedish, with sheet music)
- Kleveland, Åse; Ehrén, Svenolov (1984). Fredmans epistlar & sånger [The songs and epistles of Fredman]. Stockholm: Informationsförlaget. ISBN 91-7736-059-1. (with facsimiles of sheet music from first editions in 1790, 1791)
- Lönnroth, Lars (2005). Ljuva karneval! : om Carl Michael Bellmans diktning [Lovely Carnival! : about Carl Michael Bellman's Verse]. Stockholm: Bonniers. ISBN 978-91-0-057245-7. OCLC 61881374.
- Massengale, James Rhea (1979). The Musical-Poetic Method of Carl Michael Bellman. Stockholm: Almqvist & Wiksell International. ISBN 91-554-0849-4.
- Matz, Edvard (2004). Carl Michael Bellman – Nymfer och friskt kalas [Carl Michael Bellman – Nymphs and splendid feasts]. Lund: Historiska Media. ISBN 91-89442-97-0.
