= Värm mer Öl och Bröd =

Song by the 18th century Swedish bard Carl Michael Bellman

- Art song
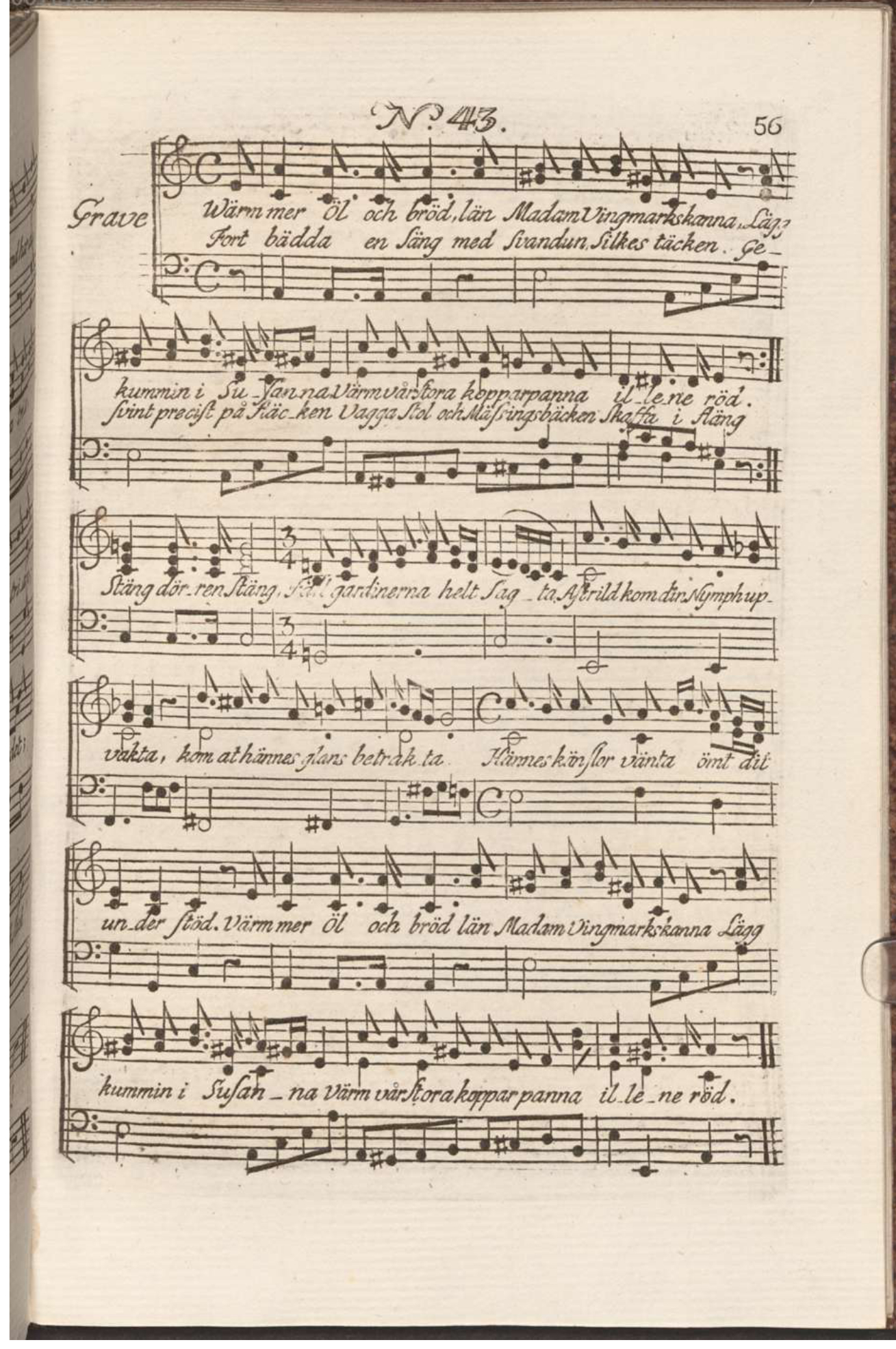
- First page of sheet music
- English: Warm more Beer and Bread
- Written: 14 November 1771
- Text: poem by Carl Michael Bellman
- Language: Swedish
- Dedication: Ulla Winblad
- Published: 1790 in Fredman's Epistles
- Scoring: voice and cittern

Värm mer Öl och Bröd (Warm more Beer and Bread) is epistle No. 43 in the Swedish poet and performer Carl Michael Bellman's 1790 song collection, Fredman's Epistles. The epistle, dated 14 November 1771, is subtitled "Till Ulla Winblad, skrifven vid et ömt tilfälle" ("To Ulla Winblad, written at a sensitive occasion"). The source of the melody has not been traced.

The song details the preparations for Ulla Winblad's childbirth. It ends with the famous and ambiguous line "Masken dold i blomman bådar blommans död" ("The worm hidden in the flower bodes the flower's death"). The epistle is unusual, too, in being quiet and delicate rather than full of noisy humour. It has been described as among the most radical and innovative of Bellman's songs.

== Context ==
Carl Michael Bellman is a central figure in the Swedish ballad tradition and a powerful influence in Swedish music, known for his 1790 Fredman's Epistles and his 1791 Fredman's Songs. A solo entertainer, he played the cittern, accompanying himself as he performed his songs at the royal court.

Jean Fredman (1712 or 1713–1767) was a real watchmaker of Bellman's Stockholm. The fictional Fredman, alive after 1767, but without employment, is the supposed narrator in Bellman's epistles and songs. The epistles, written and performed in different styles, from drinking songs and laments to pastorales, paint a complex picture of the life of the city during the 18th century. A frequent theme is the demimonde, with Fredman's cheerfully drunk Order of Bacchus, a loose company of ragged men who favour strong drink and prostitutes. At the same time as depicting this realist side of life, Bellman creates a rococo picture, full of classical allusion, following the French post-Baroque poets. The women, including the beautiful Ulla Winblad, are "nymphs", while Neptune's festive troop of followers and sea-creatures sport in Stockholm's waters. The juxtaposition of elegant and low life is humorous, sometimes burlesque, but always graceful and sympathetic. The songs are "most ingeniously" set to their music, which is nearly always borrowed and skilfully adapted.

== Song ==
=== Music ===
Melody of Epistle 43
An untraced melody in 4/4 time

The song is mainly in 4/4 time, with a section in 3/4 time. The musicologist James Massengale notes that bars 9 to 12 resemble epistle No. 1's ("Sant va dä, ingen dricker") bars 11 to 14 (the pattern recurring also in epistle No. 59, "Hurra Courage, Bagage! God dag Bröder!"). The source of the melody has not been traced. It has 2 verses, each consisting of 15 lines. The rhyming pattern is ABBBA-CDDDCC-EEEA. The song is dated 14 November 1771.

=== Lyrics ===
The song, subtitled "Till Ulla Winblad, skrifven vid et ömt tilfälle" ("To Ulla Winblad, written at a sensitive occasion"), describes the preparations for childbirth. The epistle was most likely inspired by the "real" Ulla Winblad, Maria Kristina Kiellström, who had a stillbirth in 1769.

First stanza
Swedish

Värm mer Öl och Bröd,
Län Madam Wingmarks kanna,
Lägg Kummin i, Susanna,
Värm vår stora Kopparpanna
Illene röd.
Fort bädda en Säng,
Med Svandun, Silkes-täcken;
Gesvindt, precist på fläcken,
Vagga, Stol och Mässings-bäcken,
Skaffa i fläng;
Stäng dörren, stäng;
Fäll gardinerna helt sakta;
Astrild kom, din Nymph upvakta,
Kom och Hännes glans betrakta,
Hännes känslor vänta ömt ditt understöd.

Prose translation

Warm more Beer and Bread,
Borrow Madam Wingmark's jug,
Add Cumin, Susanna,
Heat our large copper pan
Glowing red.
Quickly make a Bed,
With Swan-down, Silk quilts;
Rapidly, just here,
Cradle, Chair and Brass Basin,
Bring in a hurry;
Close the door, close it;
Lower the blinds really slowly;
Astrild come, watch over your Nymph,
Come and see her splendour,
Her feelings delicately await your support.

== Reception and legacy ==
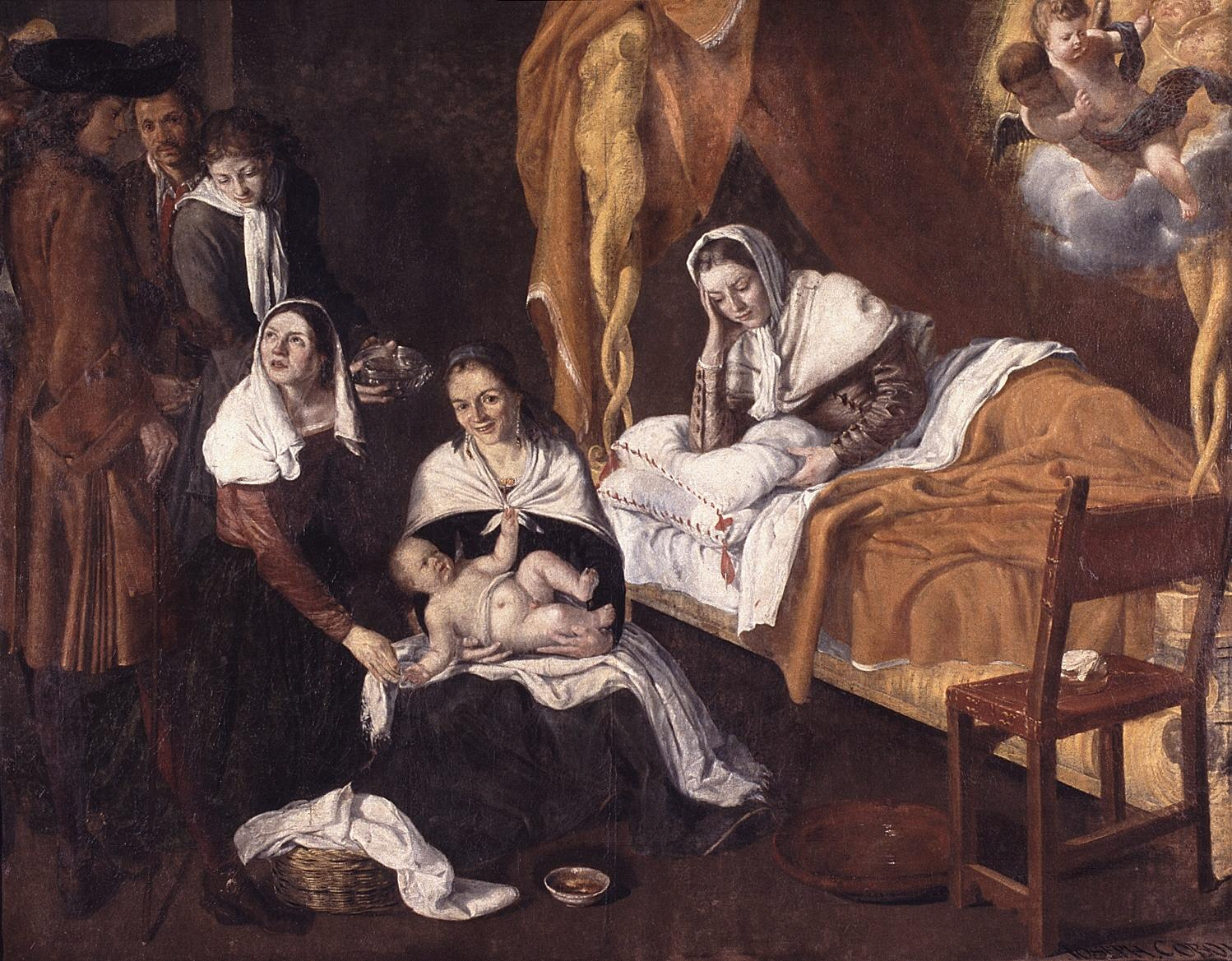
Childbirth at home in the 18th century. 1718 painting by José Ignacio Cobo y Guzmán

The Bellman interpreter Thord Lindé writes that the preparations for childbirth form an unusual theme for a song, certainly unique in Bellman's work. In unhygienic 18th century Stockholm, childbirth was a risky event, both for mother and baby. In Lindé's view, the epistle "weaves together birth and death in a very beautiful, sensitive, and gripping way". Carina Burman comments in her biography that pregnancy and childbirth appear in various places in Bellman's work, most poetically in epistle No. 43 with Ulla Winblad in the birthing-bed; in the most burlesque detail in his 1783 book-length poem Bacchi Tempel, "where Ulla after Movitz's death is to give birth to a new little Movitz". She notes the grim reality of the semi-prostitution among tavern women; if they became pregnant, the best they could hope for was for the child to be given board and lodging by a midwife, and for the father to make a one-off payment in support.

Jennie Nell, writing for the Bellman Society, describes epistles 35 ("Bröderna fara väl vilse ibland") and 43 as undoubtedly the most radical and innovative of Bellman's songs. They were, she states, often chosen by female singers in the 20th century, picking up on Fredman's "perplexed and troubled" voice. Tim Berndtsson, writing on Populär poesi, comments that despite Bellman's reputation for humour, some of the best-known epistles like No. 35, No. 43, and No. 81 "Märk hur vår skugga" do not lend themselves to cheap humour. Instead, writes Berndtsson, they have an aesthetic beauty which has stood the test of time.

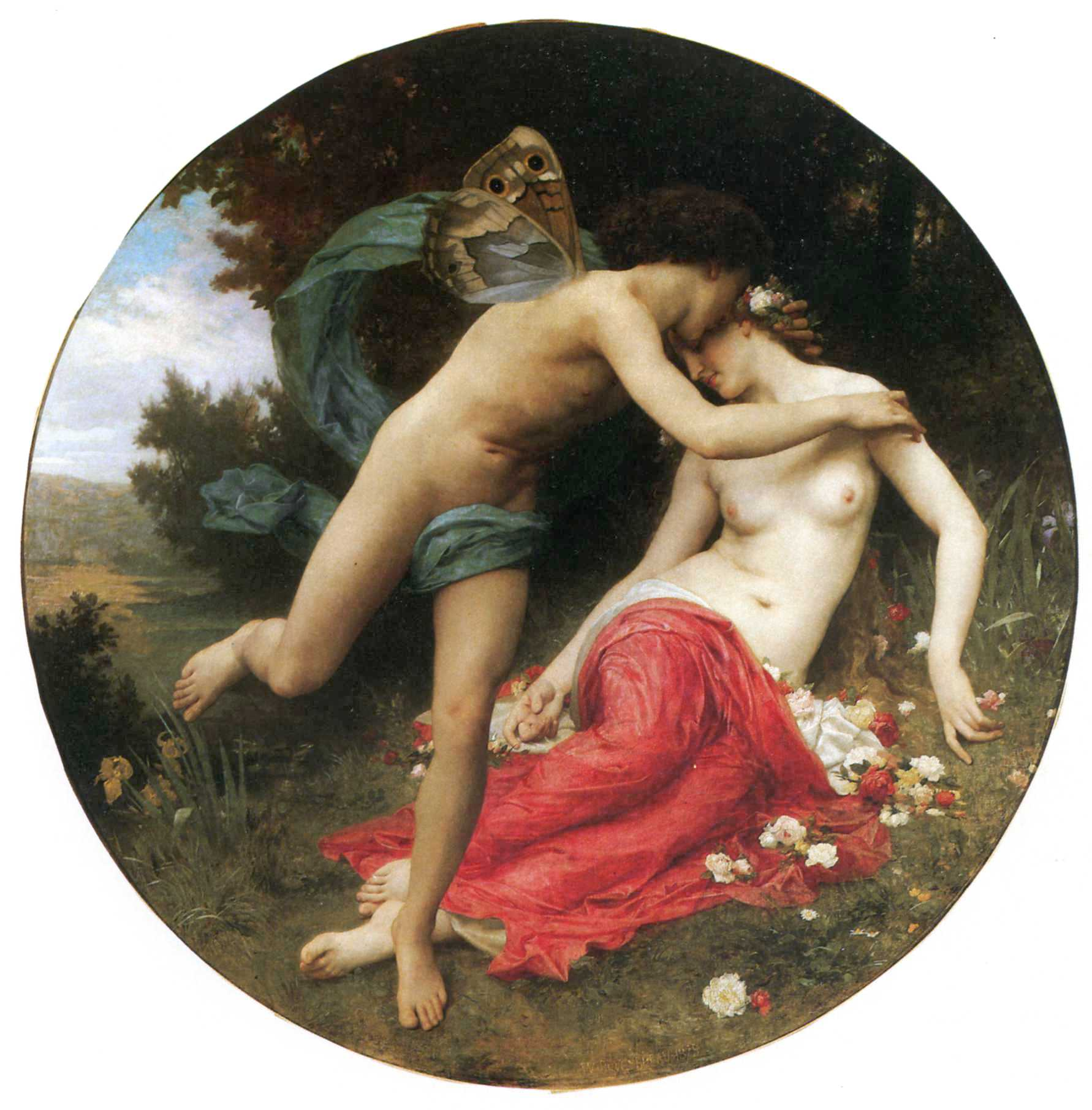
Fertile beauty: Zephyrus with the nymph Chloris surrounded by flowers, by William-Adolphe Bouguereau, 1875

Johan Stenström writes that most of the epistles are full of noise, whether it is the sound of busy taverns or all the noises of nature with bulls roaring, horses neighing, and dogs barking, while in No. 42, the only winter epistle, "wolves howl everywhere"; and the pagan gods join in, with Jove shaking the world with his thunder in epistle 80, "Liksom en Herdinna, högtids klädd". Epistle No. 43 is one of the quietest of the epistles, since like the erotic No. 72, "Glimmande Nymf!", its subject "demands silence and concentration".

The epistle ends with the famous line "Masken dold i blomman bådar blommans död" (The worm hidden in the flower bodes the flower's death"). The line has a double entendre; the scholar of literature Lennart Breitholtz stated that the worm here was a phallic symbol, and that the flower had the same metaphorical meaning as the "blomsterskål" (lit: "bowl of flowers") which Chloris may show Movitz in the next epistle, No. 44, if he "Drives in Bacchus's furrows / Up to Fröja's myrtle gate" (Note: Fröja is the Norse goddess of love, equivalent to the classical Venus/Aphrodite.) and wisely follows the advice to "Drink no more than you can hold". Burman states that the epistle's bleak ending is a description of birth, "which simultaneously becomes a description both of orgasm – the little death – and real death", without the usual exhortations to love and drunkenness. Bellman was here following in a tradition of ambiguous endings to poems, such as Israel Holmström's erotically humorous epigrams.

Epistle No. 43 has been recorded by Cornelis Vreeswijk on his 1971 album Spring mot Ulla, Spring!; by Fred Åkerström on his 1977 album Vila vid denna källa; and by the actor Mikael Samuelson on his 1990 album Sjunger Fredmans Epistlar.

== See also ==
- The Sick Rose

== Sources ==
- Bellman, Carl Michael (1790). Fredmans epistlar. Stockholm: By Royal Privilege.
- Britten Austin, Paul (1967). The Life and Songs of Carl Michael Bellman: Genius of the Swedish Rococo. New York: Allhem, Malmö American-Scandinavian Foundation. ISBN 978-3-932759-00-0.
- Burman, Carina (2019). Bellman. Biografin [Bellman: The Biography] (in Swedish). Stockholm: Albert Bonniers Förlag. ISBN 978-9100141790.
- Hassler, Göran; Dahl, Peter (illus.) (1989). Bellman – en antologi [Bellman – an anthology]. En bok för alla. ISBN 91-7448-742-6. (contains the most popular Epistles and Songs, in Swedish, with sheet music)
- Massengale, James Rhea (1979). The Musical-Poetic Method of Carl Michael Bellman. Stockholm: Almqvist & Wiksell International. ISBN 91-554-0849-4.
