= Fjäriln vingad syns på Haga =

Song by Carl Michael Bellman

"Fjäril'n vingad syns på Haga"
- Art song by Carl Michael Bellman
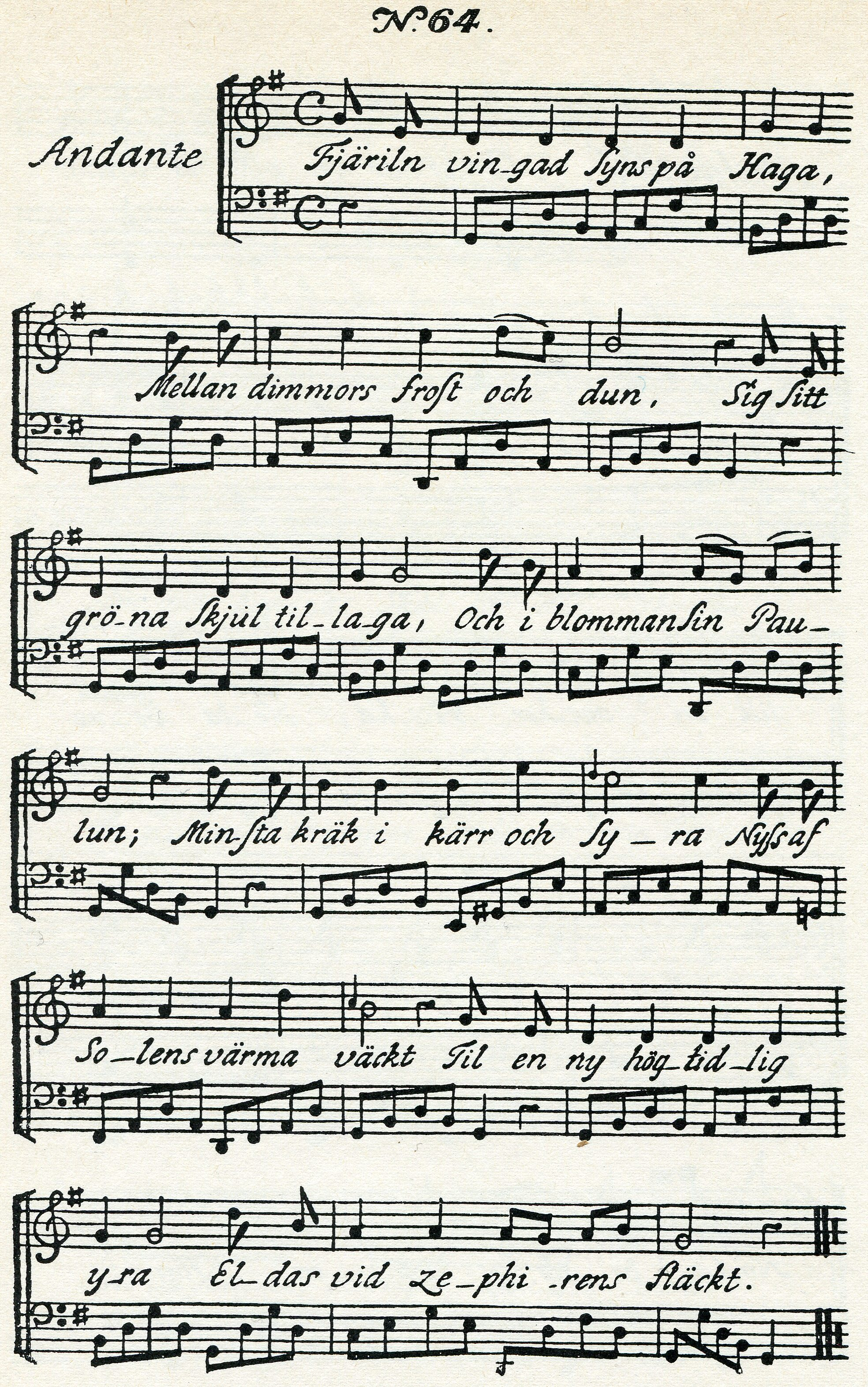
- First page of sheet music for 1791 edition
- English: The butterfly wingèd's seen in Haga
- Written: 1770 or 1771
- Text: Carl Michael Bellman
- Language: Swedish
- Published: 1791 in Fredman's Songs
- Scoring: voice and cittern

Fjäril'n vingad syns på Haga (The butterfly wingèd's seen in Haga) is one of Carl Michael Bellman's collection of songs called Fredmans sånger, published in 1791, where it is No. 64. The song describes Haga Park, the attractive natural setting of King Gustav III's never-completed Haga Palace just north of Stockholm. An earlier version of the song was a verse petition to obtain a job for Bellman's wife. The composition is one of the most popular of Bellman's songs, being known by many Swedes by heart. It has been recorded many times from 1904 onwards, and translated into English verse at least four times.

== Context ==
Carl Michael Bellman is a central figure in the Swedish ballad tradition and a powerful influence in Swedish music, known for his 1790 Fredman's Epistles and his 1791 Fredman's Songs. A solo entertainer, he played the cittern, accompanying himself as he performed his songs at the royal court.

Jean Fredman (1712 or 1713–1767) was a real watchmaker of Bellman's Stockholm. The fictional Fredman, alive after 1767, but without employment, is the supposed narrator in Bellman's epistles and songs. The epistles, written and performed in different styles, from drinking songs and laments to pastorales, paint a complex picture of the life of the city during the 18th century. A frequent theme is the demimonde, with Fredman's cheerfully drunk Order of Bacchus, a loose company of ragged men who favour strong drink and prostitutes. At the same time as depicting this realist side of life, Bellman creates a rococo picture, full of classical allusion, following the French post-Baroque poets. The women, including the beautiful Ulla Winblad, are "nymphs", while Neptune's festive troop of followers and sea-creatures sport in Stockholm's waters. The juxtaposition of elegant and low life is humorous, sometimes burlesque, but always graceful and sympathetic. The songs are "most ingeniously" set to their music, which is nearly always borrowed and skilfully adapted.

== Song ==
=== Music and verse form ===
Melody of Fredman's Song 64
Bellman's Andante tune for Fjäriln vingad

Fjäriln vingad is in 4/4 time and is marked Andante. The rhyming pattern is the alternating ABAB-CDCD. Richard Engländer writes that unlike in Bellman's parody songs, the melody is of his own composition.

=== Lyrics ===
The song, Bellman's best known, is dedicated to Captain Adolf Ulrik Kirstein, who at the time was Bellman's landlord in Klarabergsgatan, Stockholm. Bellman's biographer Lars Lönnroth states that it was originally a verse petition to baron Gustaf Mauritz Armfelt to get a job for Bellman's wife Lovisa in Haga Palace, and describes the composition as a "royalistic praise text". It was written in 1770 or 1771. The later version of the song omits the Lovisa petition, and describes Haga Park, the attractive natural setting of King Gustav III's never-completed Haga Palace just north of Stockholm.

Versions of the first stanza of song 64
Carl Michael Bellman, 1791

Fjäriln vingad syns på Haga
mellan dimmors frost och dun
sig sitt gröna skjul tillaga
och i blomman sin paulun.
Minsta kräk i kärr och syra,
nyss av solens värma väckt,
till en ny högtidlig yra
eldas vid sefirens fläkt.

Henry Grafton Chapman, 1904

O, a butterfly at Haga,
In the frosty mist was seen,
As it sought a flow'ry parlor,
Where to make its nest of green.
Thus the tiniest of creatures
With the sun's bright warmth awakes
To a new-found day of rapture,
In the wind its joy it takes.

Charles Wharton Stork, 1917

Butterflies to Haga faring,
When the frosts and fogs are spent,
Find the woods their home preparing,
Flower-enwrought their pleasure-tent.
Insects from their winter trances
Newly wakened by the sun
O'er the marsh hold festal dances
And along the dock-leaves run.

Hendrik Willem van Loon, 1939

Butterflies at Haga soaring,
Through the fog and dewy mists,
Find the trees welcome outpouring,
And the flow'rs in faithful tryst.
Ev'ry insect, long been sleeping,
By the sun's new warmth now wakes;
While the spring's bright flame comes sweeping,
And the earth new beauty takes.

Paul Britten Austin, 1977

O'er the misty park of Haga
In the frosty morning air,
To her green and fragile dwelling
See the butterfly repair.
E'en the least of tiny creatures,
By the sun and zephyrs warm'd,
Wakes to new and solemn raptures
In a bed of flowers form'd.

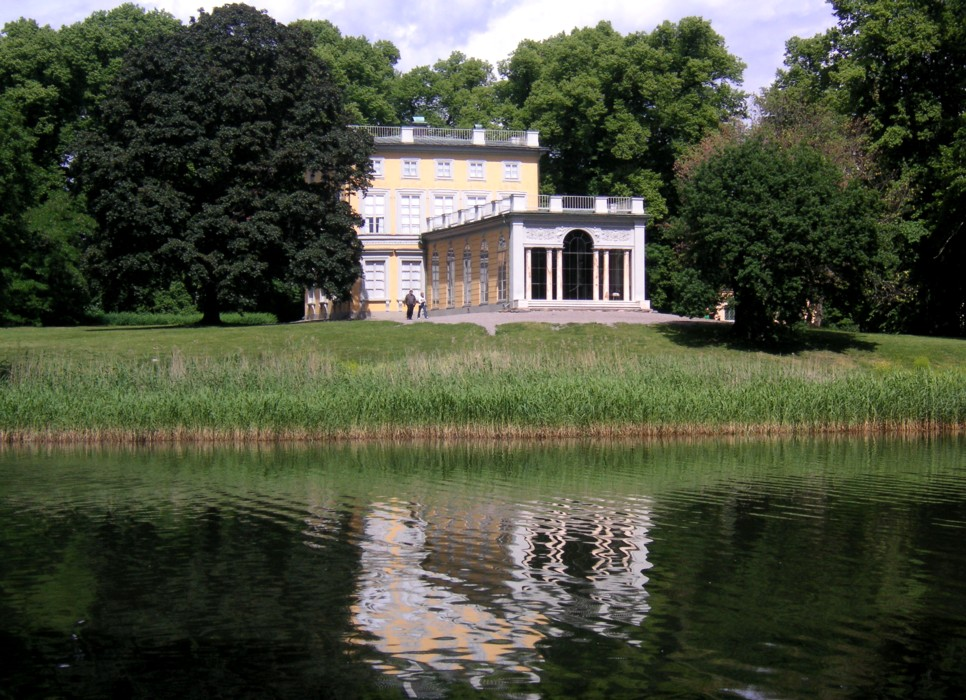
The song describes King Gustav III's Haga Park. The pavilion here is one of the few parts of his projected palace that were completed.

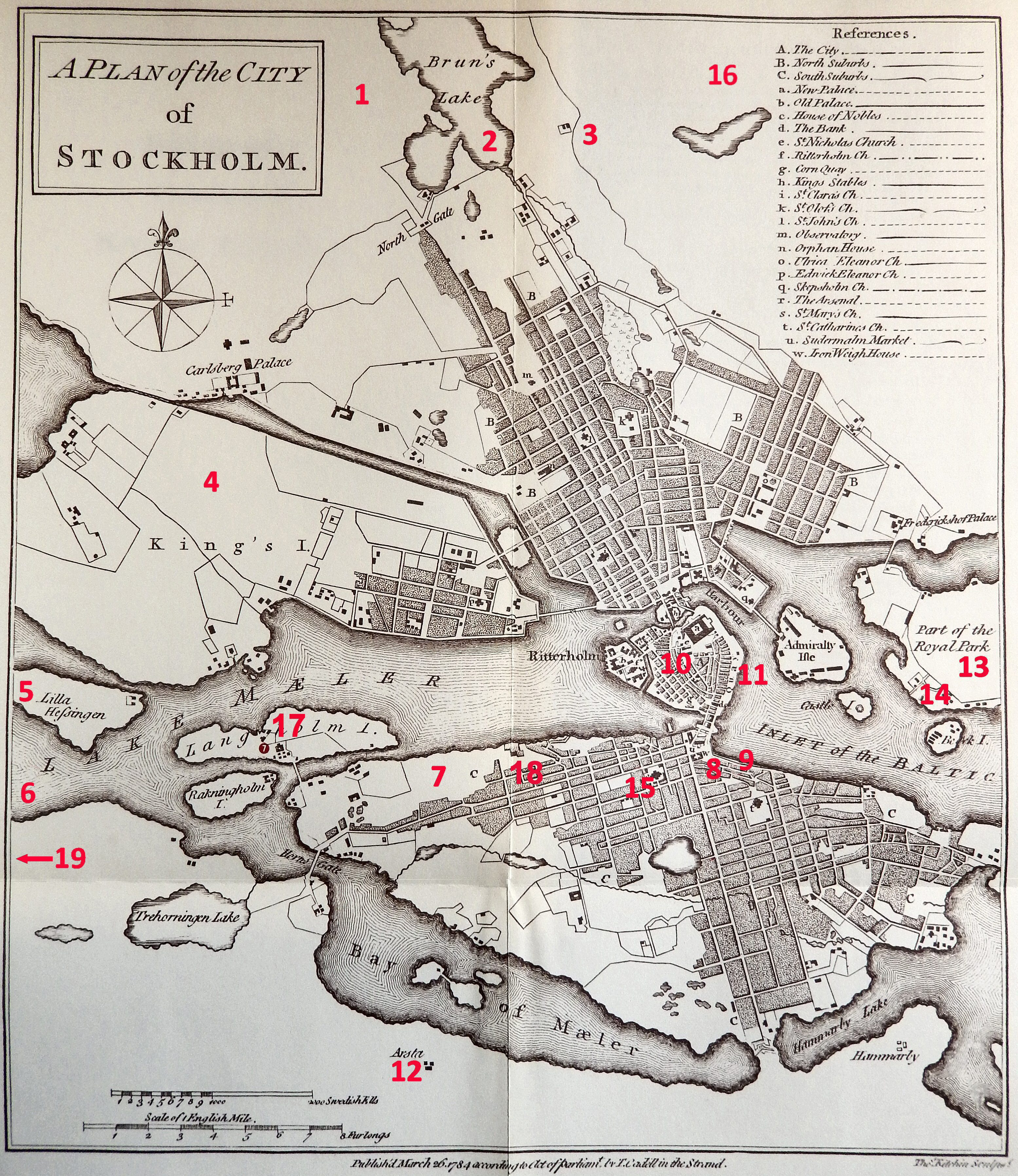
Map of Bellman's Stockholm from William Coxe's Travels into Poland, Russia, Sweden, and Denmark, 1784. Haga park is marked "1".

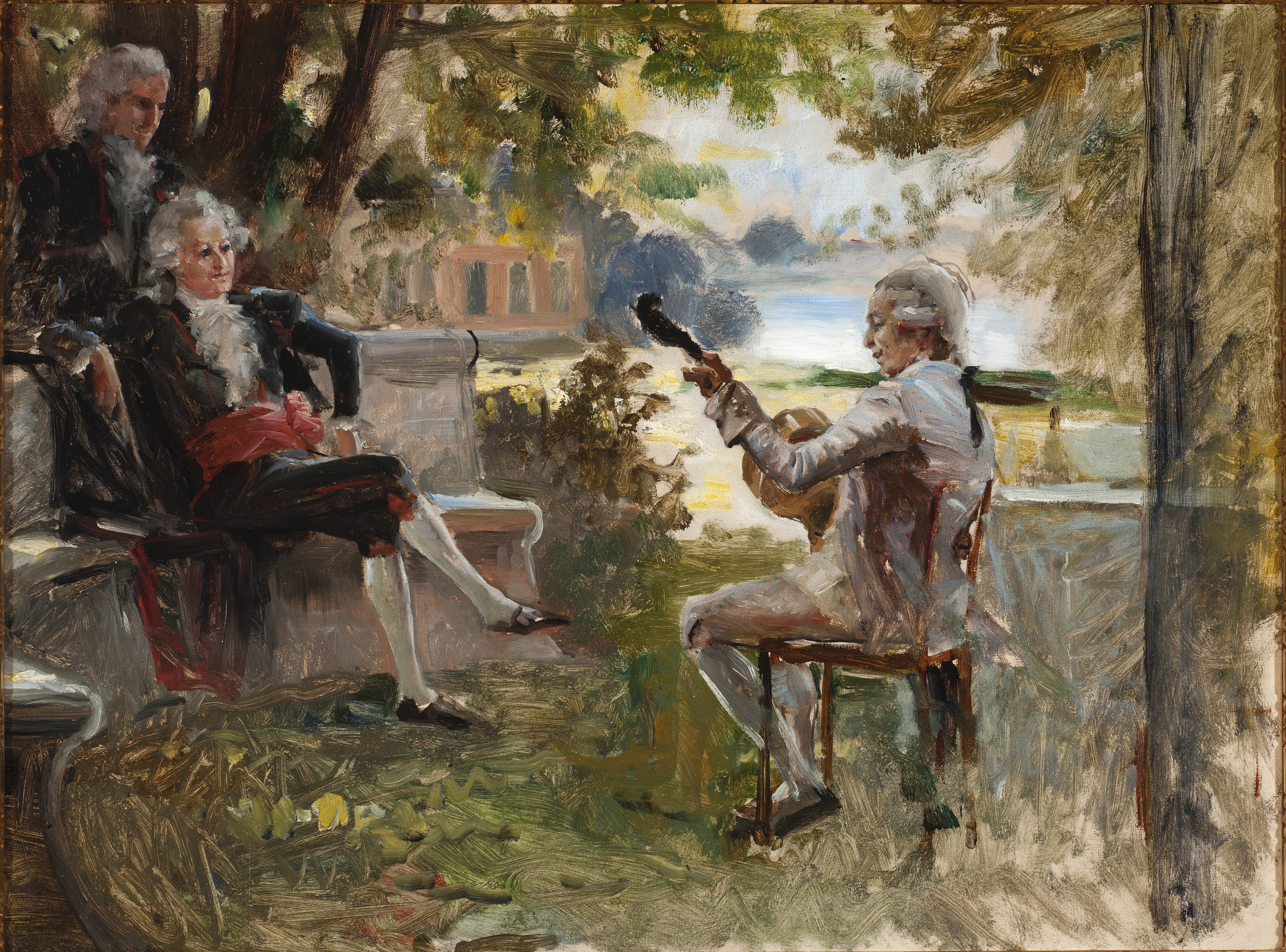
Painting of Carl Michael Bellman entertaining King Gustav III in Haga Park, by Albert Edelfelt, 1884

== Reception and legacy ==
"Fjäriln vingad syns på Haga" performed by Sune Bohlin

Fjäriln vingad remains popular in Sweden, and is one of the best-known and most often sung of Bellman's songs. It is included in a list of songs that "nearly all [Swedes] can sing unaided". A chime of bells in Solna, near the Haga park described in the song, rings out the melody every hour.

An early recording was made by Gustaf Adolf Lund in Stockholm in 1904. Johanna Grüssner and Mika Pohjola recorded it in a medley with "Glimmande nymf" on their song album Nu blir sommar in 2006.

The song has been translated into English by Henry Grafton Chapman III, Charles Wharton Stork, Helen Asbury, Noel Wirén, and Paul Britten Austin. It has been recorded in English by William Clauson, Martin Best, Barbro Strid, and Martin Bagge.

== Sources ==
- Bellman, Carl Michael (1790). Fredmans epistlar. Stockholm: By Royal Privilege.
- Britten Austin, Paul (1967). The Life and Songs of Carl Michael Bellman: Genius of the Swedish Rococo. New York: Allhem, Malmö American-Scandinavian Foundation. ISBN 978-3-932759-00-0.
- Britten Austin, Paul (1977). Fredman's Epistles and Songs. Stockholm: Reuter and Reuter. OCLC 5059758.
- Burman, Carina (2019). Bellman. Biografin [Bellman: The Biography] (in Swedish). Stockholm: Albert Bonniers Förlag. ISBN 978-9100141790.
- Chapman, Henry Grafton (trans.) (1904). Hägg, Gustaf (ed.). Songs of Sweden: Eighty-Seven Swedish Folk- and Popular Songs. New York: G. Schirmer.
- Hassler, Göran; Dahl, Peter (illus) (1989). Bellman – en antologi [Bellman – an anthology]. En bok för alla. ISBN 91-7448-742-6.
- Kleveland, Åse (1984). Fredmans epistlar & sånger [The songs and epistles of Fredman]. Illustrated by Svenolov Ehrén. Stockholm: Informationsförlaget. ISBN 91-7736-059-1. (with facsimiles of sheet music from first editions in 1790, 1791)
- Lönnroth, Lars (2005). Ljuva karneval! : om Carl Michael Bellmans diktning [Lovely Carnival! : about Carl Michael Bellman's Verse]. Stockholm: Albert Bonniers Förlag. ISBN 978-91-0-057245-7. OCLC 61881374.
- Massengale, James Rhea (1979). The Musical-Poetic Method of Carl Michael Bellman. Stockholm: Almqvist & Wiksell International. ISBN 91-554-0849-4.
- Stork, Charles Wharton (1917). Anthology of Swedish Lyrics, 1750-1915. Translated by Charles Wharton Stork. New York: The American-Scandinavian Foundation.
- Van Loon, Hendrik Willem; Castagnetta, Grace (1939). The Last of the Troubadours. New York: Simon & Schuster. OCLC 635648481.
