= Fader Bergström =

Song by the 18th century Swedish bard Carl Michael Bellman

- Art song
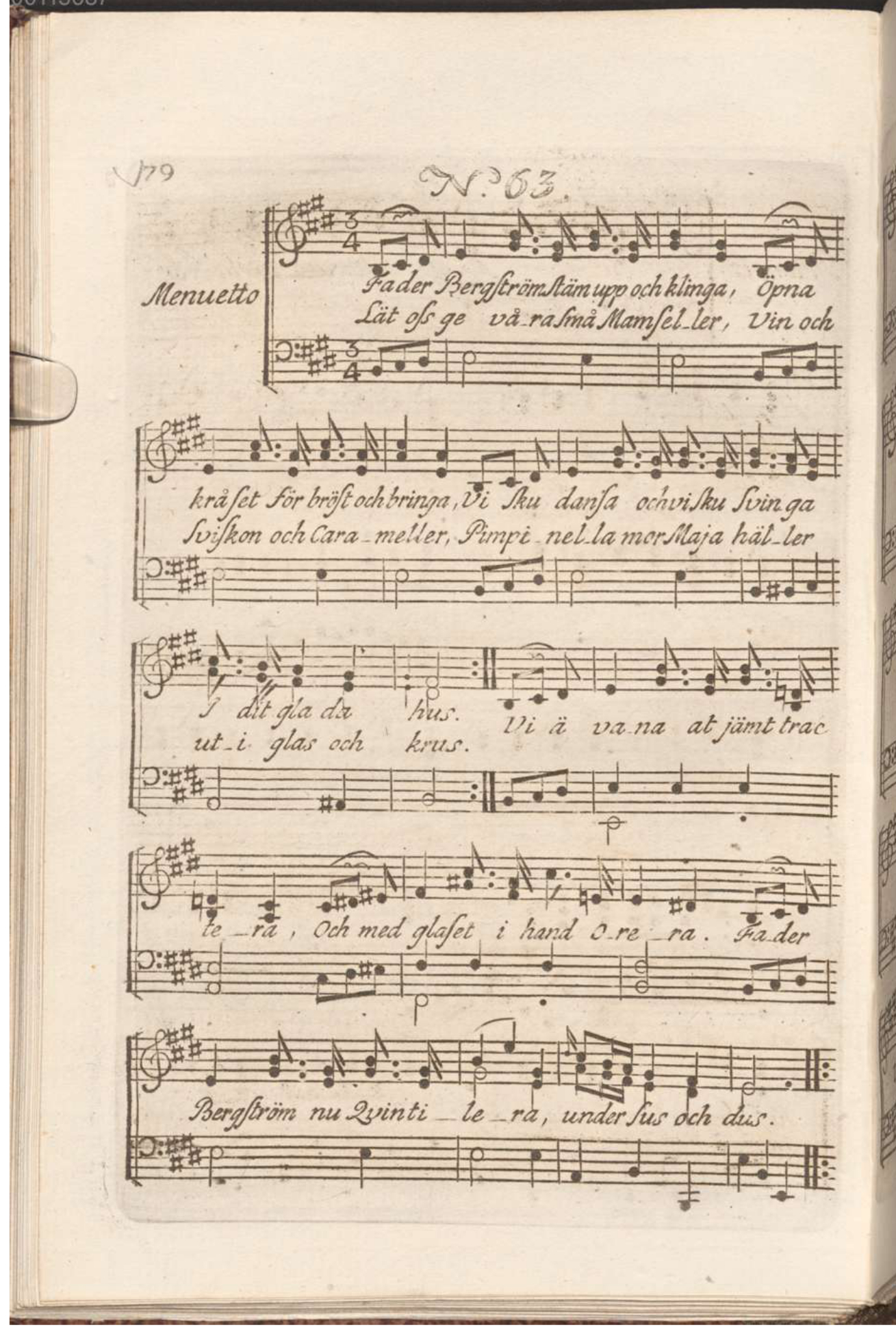
- First page of sheet music for the 1810 edition
- English: Fader Bergström
- Written: September 1773
- Text: poem by Carl Michael Bellman
- Language: Swedish
- Melody: Carl Envallsson's Bobis bröllop
- Composed: 1788
- Published: 1790 in Fredman's Epistles
- Scoring: voice and cittern

Fader Bergström, stäm upp och klinga (Father Bergström, start playing and sounding) is one of the Swedish poet and performer Carl Michael Bellman's songs, from his 1790 collection, Fredman's Epistles, where it is No. 63. The melody is based on a minuet by Carl Envallsson. Bergström was a musician, and the song celebrates dancing and drinking late into the evening. The song, written in 1773, was revised heavily to make it suitable for publication. The initial version, naming Movitz not Bergström as the musician, was an attack on an over-zealous priest who had caused Bellman to be summonsed for an earlier poem that had joked about salvation. The song has been recorded by Bellman interpreters including Fred Åkerström, Fredrik Berg, and Rolf Leanderson.

== Context ==
Carl Michael Bellman is a central figure in the Swedish ballad tradition and a powerful influence in Swedish music, known for his 1790 Fredman's Epistles and his 1791 Fredman's Songs. A solo entertainer, he played the cittern, accompanying himself as he performed his songs at the royal court.

Jean Fredman (1712 or 1713–1767) was a real watchmaker of Bellman's Stockholm. The fictional Fredman, alive after 1767, but without employment, is the supposed narrator in Bellman's epistles and songs. The epistles, written and performed in different styles, from drinking songs and laments to pastorales, paint a complex picture of the life of the city during the 18th century. A frequent theme is the demimonde, with Fredman's cheerfully drunk Order of Bacchus, a loose company of ragged men who favour strong drink and prostitutes. At the same time as depicting this realist side of life, Bellman creates a rococo picture, full of classical allusion, following the French post-Baroque poets. The women, including the beautiful Ulla Winblad, are "nymphs", while Neptune's festive troop of followers and sea-creatures sport in Stockholm's waters. The juxtaposition of elegant and low life is humorous, sometimes burlesque, but always graceful and sympathetic. The songs are "most ingeniously" set to their music, which is nearly always borrowed and skilfully adapted.

== Song ==
=== Music and verse form ===
Melody of Epistle 63
From a minuet by Matheus Daniel Böritz in Carl Envallsson's 1788 Bobis bröllop

The song is marked "Diktad midt i veckan" (Dictated midweek); it was written in September 1773. The melody is in the key of D major, marked Menuetto (a courtly dance), and in [[ Triple metre|3/4 time]]. There are two long verses, each of 24 lines. The rhyming pattern is the shifting BBBC-DDDC-EEEC-ABAB-CDCD-EEED. The melody was derived from a minuet with the "timbre" label "Minuet af herr Böritz d. ä." in Carl Envallsson's 1788 Bobis bröllop.

=== Lyrics ===
The lyrics have been translated into English by Eva Toller. Bergström was a musician, playing a wind instrument for people's name days in the Katarina Church area of Stockholm, and the song celebrates dancing and drinking late into the evening. The last few lines run:

The last lines of epistle 63
| Carl Michael Bellman, 1790 | Eva Toller's prose translation |
|---|---|
| Väljom nattens sköte under aftonstjärnans klara brand till vårt glada möte, med pokaln i hand; och i mörkrets dvala res Cupidos altar, där du spör, Bacchi källarsvala druvans ångor strör. Lät den dumma i oket tråka och den sluga sin hjärna bråka! Vin och flickor och Fredmans stråka natten ljuvlig gör. | Choose the bosom of the night, below the bright flame of the evening star for our happy gathering, with the goblet in our hands; and in the drowsy darkness, erect the altar of Cupid, where you see (that) the cellar-cool vapours of Bacchus's grapes are spread. Let the dull one be bored in the yoke, and the cunning one exercise his brain! Wine and girls and Fredman's violin-bow make the night delightful. |

== Reception and legacy ==
Bellman's biographer Carina Burman records that the original 1773 version differed in many ways from the final 1790 text. It was originally Movitz who was playing, not Bergström; and the second verse was completely rewritten. She explains that an over-zealous priest, Nils Jacob Nymansson of Ulrika Eleonora Church on Kungsholmen, had been angered by one of Bellman's poems which likened the comfort offered by a beautiful girl, when Bellman was frightened by a thunderstorm, to salvation. That merely made the Age of Enlightenment laugh, but for the church it was an insult. The King had announced the freedom of the press, but the church considered itself an exception. Bellman was summonsed to appear before the Chancellor of Justice, but fortunately the King found the matter ridiculous. Bellman, a mild-mannered man, was sufficiently annoyed to write an attack upon Nymansson, in the form of the epistle. The first verse mentioned prostitution, a seller of lemons no longer carrying a heavy basket of fruit, but "Now among Barons / She dances herself warm". Burman suggests that this frank description among the otherwise playful lines was perhaps a hint of Bellman's anger. The second verse, she writes, paints a picture of chaos. It describes Nymansson as the biblical sea-monster or crocodile Leviathan, who with unrestrained lust visits brothels and puts street-girls up "against planks and walls" in Stockholm's alleys to do as he likes with them. Meanwhile, the verse states that the priest condemns Fredman's (a.k.a. Bellman's) "tender love" for his girl Iris. Movitz is exhorted to do as the pope had done (with a papal bull in July 1773) and drive out the harmful priests. Burman comments that the epistle's sharp tone was nothing like Bellman's usual style; the words were strong for an age where people were readily punished for blasphemy. Finally, according to the 1773 version, the priest falls over, but "it doesn't matter". None of this appeared in the final printed version.

Epistle 63 has been recorded by Fred Åkerström on his 1974 album Glimmande nymf, by Fredrik Berg on his 2014 album Angående Fredrik Bergs tolkning av C M Bellman, where it is the first track, and by Rolf Leanderson on his 2012 album Carl Michael Bellman: Songs & Epistles in Swedish.

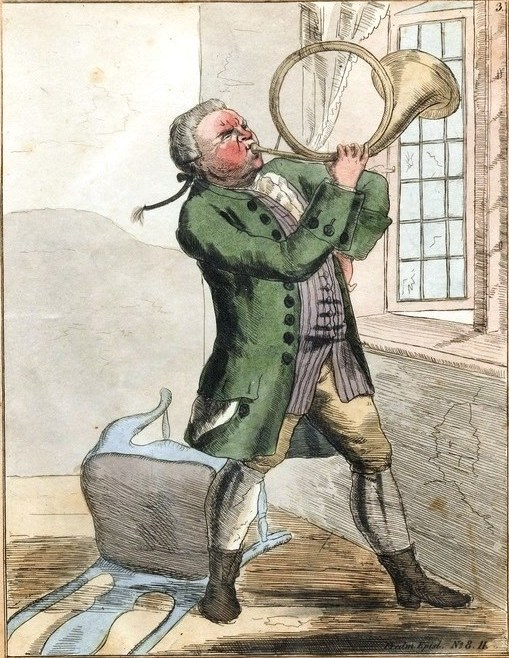
Fader Bergström by Elis Chiewitz, 1826

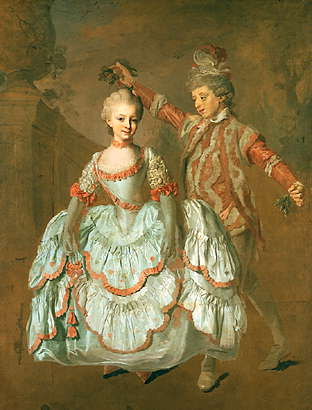
Dancing a minuet in 18th century Sweden. Painting by Lorens Pasch, 1760

== Sources ==
- Bellman, Carl Michael (1790). Fredmans epistlar. Stockholm: By Royal Privilege.
- Britten Austin, Paul (1967). The Life and Songs of Carl Michael Bellman: Genius of the Swedish Rococo. New York: Allhem, Malmö American-Scandinavian Foundation. ISBN 978-3-932759-00-0.
- Burman, Carina (2019). Bellman. Biografin [Bellman: The Biography] (in Swedish). Stockholm: Albert Bonniers Förlag. ISBN 978-9100141790.
- Hassler, Göran; Dahl, Peter (illus.) (1989). Bellman – en antologi [Bellman – an anthology]. En bok för alla. ISBN 91-7448-742-6. (contains the most popular Epistles and Songs, in Swedish, with sheet music)
- Kleveland, Åse; Svenolov Ehrén (illus.) (1984). Fredmans epistlar & sånger [The songs and epistles of Fredman]. Stockholm: Informationsförlaget. ISBN 91-7736-059-1. (with facsimiles of sheet music from first editions in 1790, 1791)
- Massengale, James Rhea (1979). The Musical-Poetic Method of Carl Michael Bellman. Stockholm: Almqvist & Wiksell International. ISBN 91-554-0849-4.
