= Liksom en Herdinna, högtids klädd =

Song by the 18th century Swedish bard Carl Michael Bellman

- Art song
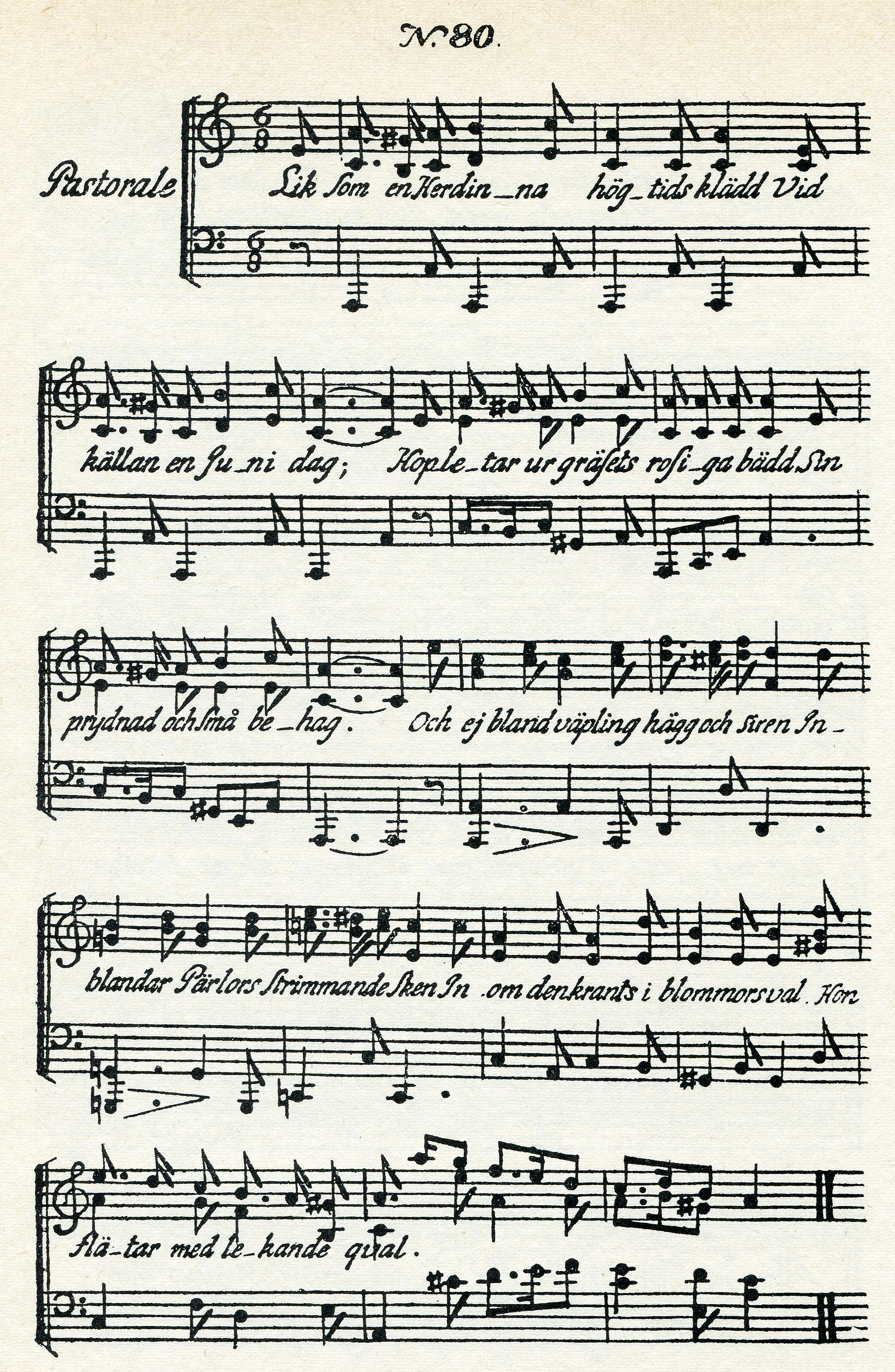
- First page of sheet music for Epistle 80, a Siciliana or musical pastorale
- English: Like a Shepherdess, festively dressed
- Written: 1789 or 1790
- Text: poem by Carl Michael Bellman
- Language: Swedish
- Melody: Unknown origin, perhaps Bellman himself
- Published: 1790 in Fredman's Epistles
- Scoring: voice and cittern

Liksom en Herdinna, högtids klädd ("Like a Shepherdess, festively dressed"), is a song by the Swedish poet and performer Carl Michael Bellman from his 1790 collection, Fredman's Epistles, where it is No. 80. The Epistle is subtitled "Angående Ulla Winblads Lustresa til Första Torpet, utom Kattrumps Tullen" (Concerning Ulla Winblad's pleasure-trip to Första Torpet, outside Kattrump Tollgate). It is a pastorale, starting with a near-paraphrase of Nicolas Boileau-Despréaux's French guide to the construction of pastoral verse. That doesn't prevent the supposed shepherd and shepherdess from falling into bed drunk at the end of the song. It has been described as lovelier in Swedish than in Boileau's original French. The epistle's humorous depiction of the human condition has been praised by critics.

== Context ==
Carl Michael Bellman is a central figure in the Swedish ballad tradition and a powerful influence in Swedish music, known for his 1790 Fredman's Epistles and his 1791 Fredman's Songs. A solo entertainer, he played the cittern, accompanying himself as he performed his songs at the royal court.

Jean Fredman (1712 or 1713–1767) was a real watchmaker of Bellman's Stockholm. The fictional Fredman, alive after 1767, but without employment, is the supposed narrator in Bellman's epistles and songs. The epistles, written and performed in different styles, from drinking songs and laments to pastorales, paint a complex picture of the life of the city during the 18th century. A frequent theme is the demimonde, with Fredman's cheerfully drunk Order of Bacchus, a loose company of ragged men who favour strong drink and prostitutes. At the same time as depicting this realist side of life, Bellman creates a rococo picture, full of classical allusion, following the French post-Baroque poets. The women, including the beautiful Ulla Winblad, are "nymphs", while Neptune's festive troop of followers and sea-creatures sport in Stockholm's waters. The juxtaposition of elegant and low life is humorous, sometimes burlesque, but always graceful and sympathetic. The songs are "most ingeniously" set to their music, which is nearly always borrowed and skilfully adapted.

== Song ==
=== Music and verse form ===
Melody of Epistle 80
A Siciliana, a musical pastoral piece

Epistle 80 of Fredman's Epistles is dedicated to the poet and founder member of the Swedish Academy, Johan Henric Kellgren. The song has six stanzas, each of 8 lines. The rhyming pattern is ABAB-CCDD. The scholar of Swedish literature Lars Lönnroth states that the song form of the Epistle is a Siciliana, a musical pastoral piece. The music is in 6/8 time and is marked pastorale. The source melody is unknown.

=== Lyrics ===
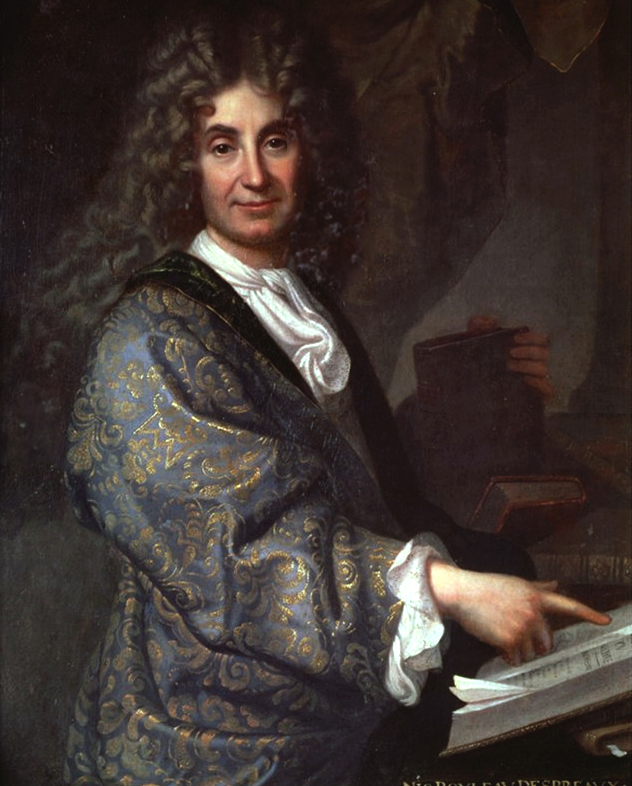
Epistle 80 starts with a close paraphrase from Nicolas Boileau-Despréaux's 1674 guide to writing pastorales.

The song, written in 1789 or 1790, starts with a near-paraphrase of the French poet and critic Nicolas Boileau-Despréaux's classic 1674 L'Art Poetique, a guide on the construction of pastoral verse:

Inspiration for Epistle No. 80
Nicolas Boileau-Despréaux, 1674	Prose translation
Telle qu'une bergère, au plus beau jour de fête, De superbes rubis ne charge point sa tête, Et, sans mêler à l'or l'éclat des diamants, Cueille en un champ voisin ses plus beaux ornements;	As a shepherdess, on the finest feast day, Does not load her head with splendid rubies, And, without mixing her gold with the sparkle of diamonds, Picks in a nearby field its most beautiful ornaments;

Epistle No. 80, first verse
Carl Michael Bellman, 1790

Liksom en Herdinna, högtids klädd,
Vid Källan en Juni dag,
Hopletar ur gräsets rosiga bädd
Sin prydnad och små behag.
Och ej bland Väpling, Hägg och Siren,
Inblandar Pärlors strimmande sken,
Innom den krants i blommors val,
Hon flätar med lekande qval.

Prose translation

As a Shepherdess festively dressed
By the spring one day in June
gathers from the grass's rosy bed
adornments and accents for her dress.
And not among clover, may and lilac,
Is mixed the streaming shine of pearls,
Inside the wreath of her choice of flowers,
She braids with playful care.

Hendrik Willem van Loon, 1939

She looks like a festive shepherdess,
One bright summer day in June.
She gathers the flowers for her dress,
Her hair with garlands strewn.
No glimmer of the pearl is shown.
'Tis clover, birch and lilac alone.
She wreathes the flow'rs with sad restraint,
And tenderly hums her soft plaint.

Paul Britten Austin, 1967

As festively garb'd a shepherdess
A garland of grasses weaves,
And kneels by the spring to garnish her dress
Entwining wild roses' leaves,
Nor blends with clover, lilac and may,
A sheen of pearls on midsummer day,
In one fair wreath of leafy spoils,
Whereo'er she so gracefully toils:

The Epistle's tone soon departs from Boileau, as the nymph of verse 2 is a prostitute. Furthermore, a horse appears as a symbol of erotic energy, as it does in Epistles 70 ("Movitz vik mössan högt öfver öra") and 71 ("Ulla! min Ulla! säj får jag dig bjuda"), and this is juxtaposed with a mention of Ulla Winblad. However, Bellman displays a fine feeling for nature in the Epistle.

== Reception and legacy ==
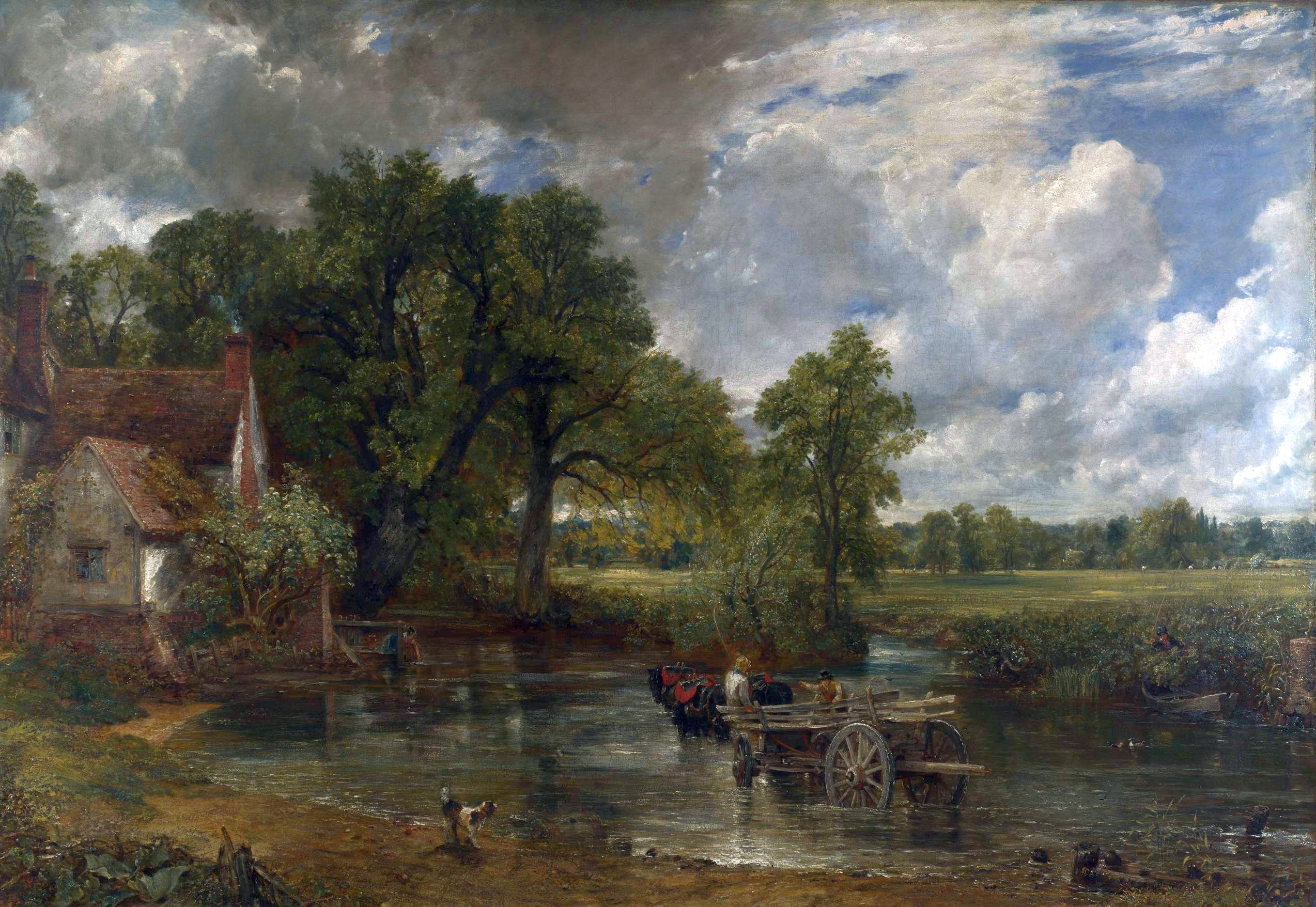
Liksom en herdinna has been described as depicting a scene much like John Constable's oil paintings (here his 1821 The Hay Wain) as the "farmer heavy on staggering wheel" trundles through the meadows.

Bellman's biographer Paul Britten Austin describes the song "with its almost religious invocation of a shepherdess, 'clad for some solemn feast'" as "more lovely in Swedish" than in Boileau's French. He comments that in the Epistle, Bellman depicts the countryside just north of Stockholm like a John Constable painting, with "Mark how between meadows all awry/the Cot to the lake descends... Where farmer heavy on staggering wheel/Makes haste to his hearth and evening meal". However, he finds "quintessentially Swedish" the mood of high summer, with a swallow flying into the room, the cock crowing outside, and the bell of the village church ringing steadily. Everything is perfectly innocent until the last verse, when "Ulla, flat in the face of all Boileau-esque canons of what is permitted in a pastoral and forgetting all new-found respectability, falls into bed with her cavalier, both having drunk too much."

Lönnroth writes that Bellman, who had begun to observe the human condition with nature's help in earlier Epistles, brought the approach to perfection with Epistles 71 and 80. He notes that the description of the rural environment and Ulla Winblad's way of dressing both respond to the classical ideal of tasteful simplicity without frills. The song perfectly fits Boileau's pastoral idyll, until the last two verses when the "shepherd" and his "shepherdess" throw aside their conventional masks and reveal themselves as "drunk, untidy, and not specially well-brought-up".

Carina Burman comments in her biography of Bellman that Epistle 80 is one of six or seven new songs, in her view more classical in tone and better suited to print than Bellman's more strident Baroque verse of the 1770s. The Epistle has been translated into English by Eva Toller. It appears on the 1969 studio album Fred sjunger Bellman by the Bellman interpreter Fred Åkerström, re-released on CD in 1990, and on Mikael Samuelsson's 1990 Sjunger Fredmans Epistlar.

== Sources ==
- Bellman, Carl Michael (1790). Fredmans epistlar (in Swedish). Stockholm: By Royal Privilege.
- Boileau-Despréaux, Nicolas (1837). Œuvres complètes, avec des notes par m. Berriat-Saint-Prix [Complete Works, with Notes by Mr. Berriat-Saint-Prix] (in French). Vol. 2. Paris: Chez Philippe.
- Britten Austin, Paul (1967). The Life and Songs of Carl Michael Bellman: Genius of the Swedish Rococo. New York: Allhem, Malmö American-Scandinavian Foundation. ISBN 978-3-932759-00-0.
- Burman, Carina (2019). Bellman. Biografin [Bellman: The Biography] (in Swedish). Stockholm: Albert Bonniers Förlag. ISBN 978-9100141790.
- Hassler, Göran; Dahl, Peter (illus.) (1989). Bellman – en antologi [Bellman – an anthology] (in Swedish). Stockholm: En bok för alla. ISBN 91-7448-742-6. (contains the most popular Epistles and Songs, with sheet music)
- Kleveland, Åse; Ehrén, Svenolov (illus.) (1984). Fredmans epistlar & sånger [The songs and epistles of Fredman] (in Swedish). Stockholm: Informationsförlaget. ISBN 91-7736-059-1. (with facsimiles of sheet music from first editions in 1790, 1791)
- Lönnroth, Lars (2005). Ljuva karneval! : om Carl Michael Bellmans diktning [Lovely Carnival! : about Carl Michael Bellman's Verse] (in Swedish). Stockholm: Albert Bonniers Förlag. ISBN 978-91-0-057245-7. OCLC 61881374.
- Massengale, James Rhea (1979). The Musical-Poetic Method of Carl Michael Bellman. Stockholm: Almqvist & Wiksell International. ISBN 91-554-0849-4.
- Van Loon, Hendrik Willem; Castagnetta, Grace (1939). The Last of the Troubadours. New York: Simon & Schuster.
