= Bröderna fara väl vilse ibland =

Song by the 18th century Swedish bard Carl Michael Bellman

- Art song
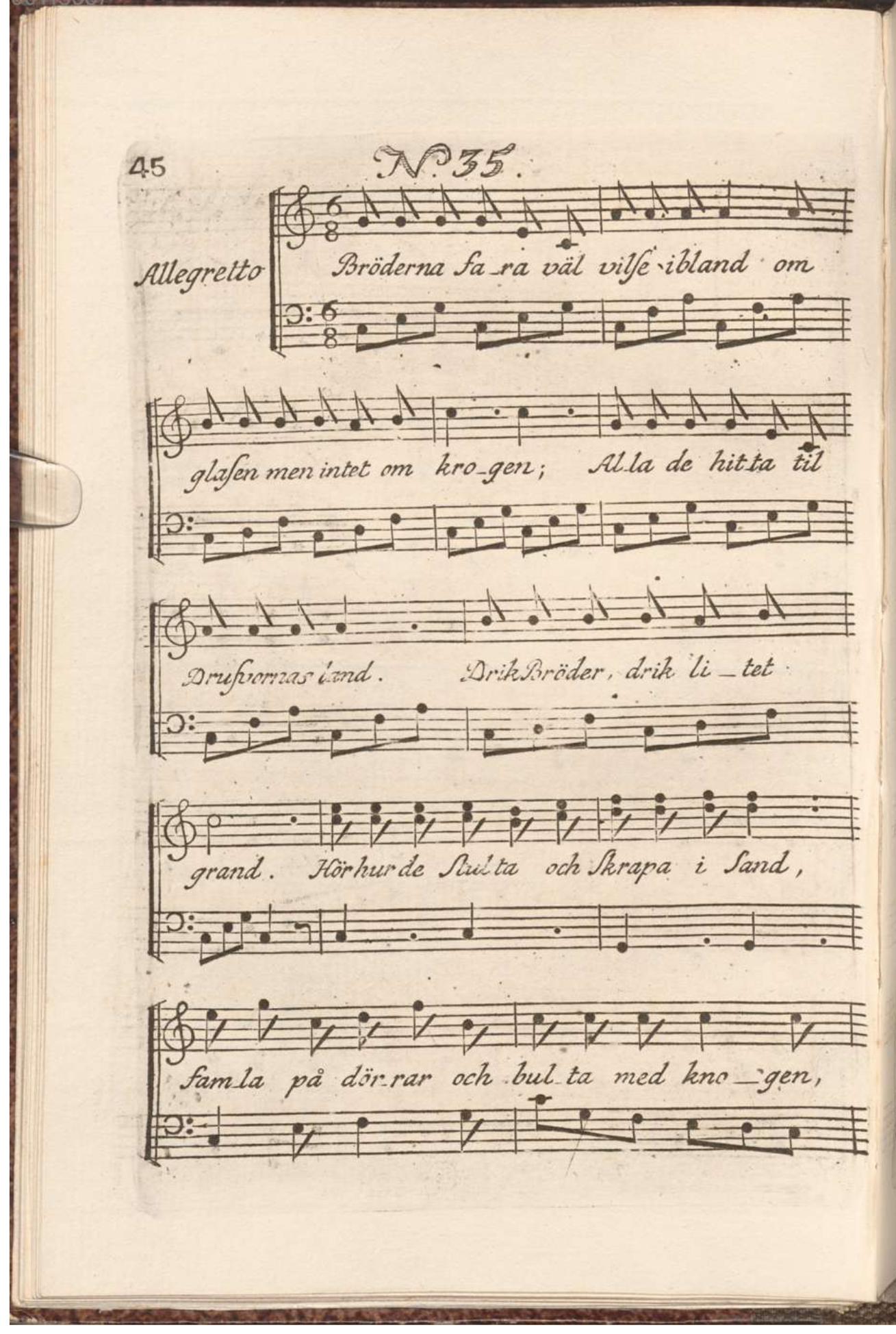
- First page of sheet music for the 1810 edition
- English: Brothers lose their way at times
- Written: 1771
- Text: poem by Carl Michael Bellman
- Language: Swedish
- Published: 1790 in Fredman's Epistles
- Scoring: voice and cittern

Bröderna fara väl vilse ibland (Brothers lose their way at times), is a song by the Swedish poet and performer Carl Michael Bellman, from his 1790 collection, Fredman's Epistles, where it is No. 35. The epistle is subtitled "Angående sin Sköna och hännes obeständighet." (About his beautiful girl, and her unreliability). The first verse ends "My girl has forgotten me, I'll die faithful. Night and day in drunkenness, shall all my sorrow pass away."

The epistle has been called one of Bellman's most radical and innovative. He uses several metrical devices to counteract the simple beat of the melody. The epistle is about drinking, but has been praised by critics such as Lars Warme for having risen far above that song-form. The first couplet plays humorously on a verse from the Bible, singing not of the danger of sin but of picking up the wrong glass in a tavern. Fred Åkerström recorded two different versions of the Epistle, giving the text new life and depth.

== Context ==
Carl Michael Bellman is a central figure in the Swedish ballad tradition and a powerful influence in Swedish music, known for his 1790 Fredman's Epistles and his 1791 Fredman's Songs. A solo entertainer, he played the cittern, accompanying himself as he performed his songs at the royal court.

Jean Fredman (1712 or 1713–1767) was a real watchmaker of Bellman's Stockholm. The fictional Fredman, alive after 1767, but without employment, is the supposed narrator in Bellman's epistles and songs. The epistles, written and performed in different styles, from drinking songs and laments to pastorales, paint a complex picture of the life of the city during the 18th century. A frequent theme is the demimonde, with Fredman's cheerfully drunk Order of Bacchus, a loose company of ragged men who favour strong drink and prostitutes. At the same time as depicting this realist side of life, Bellman creates a rococo picture, full of classical allusion, following the French post-Baroque poets. The women, including the beautiful Ulla Winblad, are "nymphs", while Neptune's festive troop of followers and sea-creatures sport in Stockholm's waters. The juxtaposition of elegant and low life is humorous, sometimes burlesque, but always graceful and sympathetic. The songs are "most ingeniously" set to their music, which is nearly always borrowed and skilfully adapted.

== Song ==
Melody of Epistle 35

=== Melody and verse form ===
The tune is a variant of a melody from Pierre Laujon's opera Silvie, Act II, Scene 5. The epistle has five verses, each of twelve lines. Its time signature is 4/4, with its tempo marked Grave. The rhyming pattern is ABAA-ABAA-CBCC. The epistle is dated 14 December 1771.

=== Lyrics ===
First stanza in prose and verse
Carl Michael Bellman, 1790

Bröderna fara väl vilse ibland
Om glasen men intet om krogen;
Alla de hitta til drufvornas land.
Drick bröder, drick litet grand.
Hör hur de stulta och skrapa i sand,
Famla på dörrar och bulta med knogen,
Ragla och tumla med stopet i hand,
Och blöda om tunga och tand.
Fader Movitz, slå i, slå i!
Min flicka har glömt mig, jag dör trogen;
Natt och dag jämt i fylleri,
Skal all min sorg gå förbi.

Lars Warme, prose, 1996

The brethren lose their way at times
'Mongst glasses, but never 'mongst taverns;
All of them make it to wine-grapes' land.
Drink, brethren, drink just a bit.
Hear how they totter and scrape in the sand,
Fumble at door latches, bang with their fists,
Stagger and stumble with tankard in hand,
Bleeding from biting their tongues.
Father Movitz, top off my glass!
My lass has forgotten me, I'll die faithful.
Day and night equally in drunkenness
Shall all my sorrow go by.

Eva Toller, prose, 2004

Sometimes the brethren go astray
'round the glasses, but not 'round the tavern;
they all can find their way to the land of the grapes.
Drink, brothers, drink a wee bit!
Listen to them stumbling and scraping the sand,
fumble at doors and pounding with their knuckles;
stagger and reel with the pitcher in their hand,
bleeding 'round tongue and teeth.
Father Movitz, pour out!
My girl has forgotten me, (but) I will die faithful;
night and day, always drunk;
thus shall all my sorrow pass (away).

Paul Britten Austin's verse, 1977

Truly the brethren go often astray
'Mid glasses, but never for taverns.
All to the land of the grapes find a way.
Drink brother, a little, I pray.
Hear how they stumble and scrape in the sand,
Fumble for doorways to Bacchus's caverns,
Bloody of lip how they beat on them, and
Go headlong with tankard in hand.
Father Movitz, fill up for me;
My girl has forgotten me, I die faithful.
Day and night will I drunken be
Till all my misery flee.

The epistle paints a picture of a man (the watchmaker Fredman) at the end of his wits, disappointed in love, trying to forget his feelings in drink, and recalling how he "gave her gifts and gold". He compares himself to a bird snared in a trap "and I scarcely even have death as a friend". In the last verse he recalls her skin "and her eyes' burning games" he feels his heart "heavy as lead", but at last he curses her: "Damn you for betraying me!", and says enough.

== Reception and legacy ==
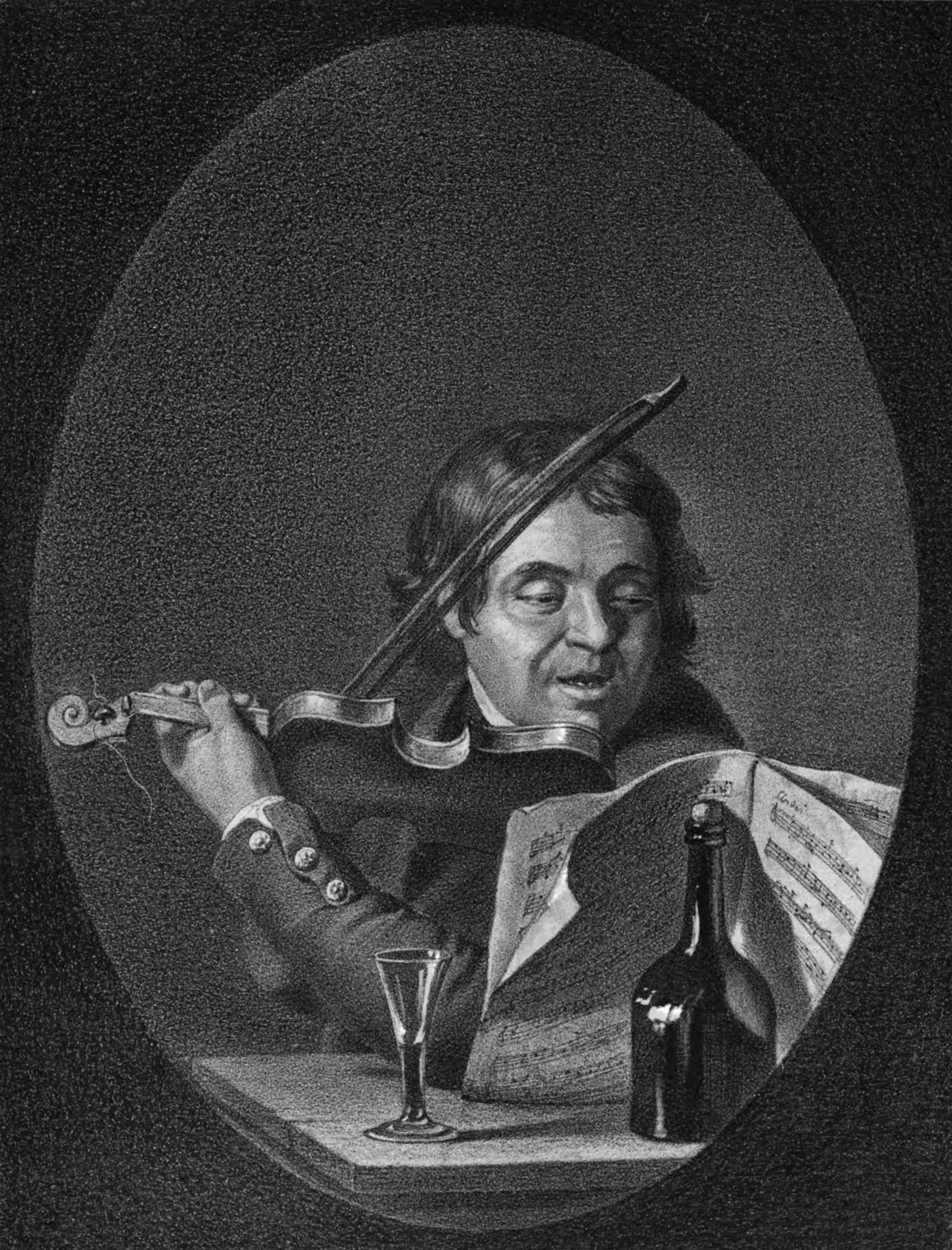
Lithograph of Jean Fredman by Pehr Hilleström, 1865

The musicologist James Massengale points out that in this epistle, Bellman has used an array of devices to counteract the "metrically plodding melody". He uses anadiplosis (repeating the last word of a clause at the start of the next) in verse 3 with "...skaffa jag barnet; barnet det dog,..." and again in verse 4; he uses epanalepsis (repeating the first word of a clause at its end) in verse 3, with "Men, min Anna Greta, men!", and again in verse 5; and anaphora (repeating a word at the starts of neighbouring clauses) in verse 4, "häll den på hjärtat, häll man fyra!", and again in verse 5. Massengale observes that good musical poetry, like this epistle, is always a compromise, as it has both to fit its music or be no good as a musical setting, and to contrast with its music, or be no good as poetry. The final verse, containing all three metrical devices, is not, argues Massengale, an example of "decay", but shows Bellman's freedom, change of focus (from lament to acceptance), and the closure of the epistle.

The literary historian Lars Warme observes that a Bellman epistle "is related to a drinking song only by derivation. As an artistic achievement [the form] stands alone in the history of Swedish poetry." Warme chooses Epistle 35 as an example of a work risen far above "a drinking song".

The first couplet is a humorous play on a verse from a Biblical epistle, James 1:16, which runs:

Do not go astray, my beloved brethren.

The verse meant that the brothers should not fall into sin. Bellman's Epistle, however, supposes that going astray meant picking up the wrong glass in a tavern.

Jennie Nell, writing for the Bellman Society, describes Epistles 35 and 43 ("Värm mer öl och bröd") as undoubtedly the most radical and innovative. They were often chosen by female singers in the twentieth century, picking up on Fredman's "perplexed and troubled" voice. Epistle 35 in particular has, writes Nell, often been portrayed with "a comic undertone", but in fact it expresses "dark feelings" of jealousy, anger, and sadness, as Fredman, dropped by his lover, tries to dull his despair with drink.

The song has been recorded by Fred Åkerström, differently on two albums, Fred sjunger Bellman and Glimmande nymf; writing in Dagens Nyheter, Martin Stugart observes that Åkerström's deep voice and "rumbling throat" gave the text new life and depth, and that audiences "couldn't get enough of his interpretations" of the song, alongside other favourites like Epistle 23, "Ack, du min moder" and Epistle 72, "Glimmande nymf". Other solo singers who have recorded the Epistle include the noted Bellman interpreters Sven-Bertil Taube, and Cornelis Vreeswijk. Many recordings of Epistle 35 have been placed on YouTube. The epistle has been translated into English by Eva Toller.

== Sources ==
- Bellman, Carl Michael (1790). Fredmans epistlar. Stockholm: By Royal Privilege.
- Britten Austin, Paul (1967). The Life and Songs of Carl Michael Bellman: Genius of the Swedish Rococo. New York: Allhem, Malmö American-Scandinavian Foundation. ISBN 978-3-932759-00-0.
- Britten Austin, Paul (1977). Fredman's Epistles and Songs. Stockholm: Reuter and Reuter. OCLC 5059758.
- Hassler, Göran; Dahl, Peter (illus.) (1989). Bellman – en antologi [Bellman – an anthology]. En bok för alla. ISBN 91-7448-742-6. (contains the most popular Epistles and Songs, in Swedish, with sheet music)
- Kleveland, Åse; Ehrén, Svenolov (illus.) (1984). Fredmans epistlar & sånger [The songs and epistles of Fredman]. Stockholm: Informationsförlaget. ISBN 91-7736-059-1. (with facsimiles of sheet music from first editions in 1790, 1791)
- Massengale, James Rhea (1979). The Musical-Poetic Method of Carl Michael Bellman. Stockholm: Almqvist & Wiksell International. ISBN 91-554-0849-4.
