= Jofur =

Nordic name for thunder god

Jofur (from Old Norse Jöfurr: "wild boar") is a name used in Nordic literature for the thunder god, mainly as a synonym for Jupiter. Jofur probably originated in the writings of the 17th-century Swedish scientist and writer Olaus Rudbeckius, and has since been used in Nordic poetry, mainly during the Baroque and Rococo eras. Jofur (as a god) does not appear in Norse mythology, even though the word was also used as an honorary title for kings and heroes. The most famous use of the word is in Carl Michael Bellman's (1740-1795) song Fredman's Epistle No. 72 "Glimmande Nymf" ("Glittering Nymph"), which remains very popular and which is frequently sung in renditions by numerous artists.

== See also ==
- Astrild
