= Glimmande nymf =

Song by the 18th century Swedish bard Carl Michael Bellman

"Glimmande Nymf"
- Art song
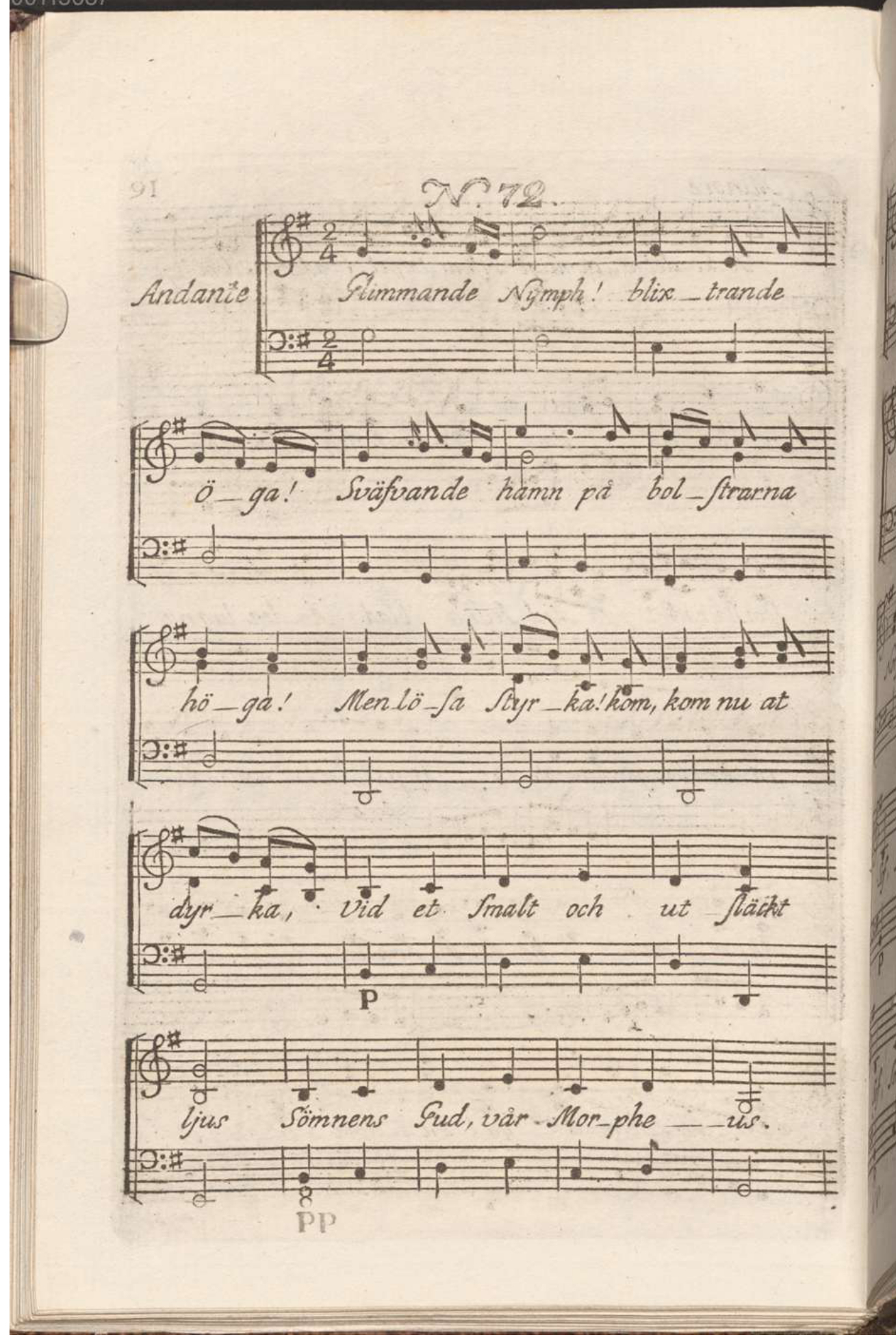
- First page of sheet music for the 1810 edition
- English: Glimmering Nymph
- Written: 1771, revised 1790
- Text: poem by Carl Michael Bellman
- Language: Swedish
- Melody: from Le peintre amoureux de son modèle
- Composed: 1757
- Published: 1790 in Fredman's Epistles
- Scoring: voice and cittern

Glimmande nymf (Glimmering Nymph), is a song by the Swedish poet and performer Carl Michael Bellman from his 1790 collection, Fredman's Epistles, where it is No. 72. It is subtitled "Lemnad vid Cajsa Lisas Säng, sent om en afton" (Left by Cajsa Lisa's Bed, late one evening), and set to a melody by Egidio Duni. A night-piece, it depicts a Rococo muse in the Ulla Winblad mould, asleep in her bed in Stockholm, complete with allusions to both classical and Nordic mythology.

Bellman's biographer, Paul Britten Austin, calls the song exquisitely delicate. It is innocently worded but clearly erotic; the initial version culminated in an account of orgasm. The mood is conveyed with a description of a rainbow — after sunset, abandoning realism for poetic effect. The melody has been called "languorous and intense".

== Context ==
Carl Michael Bellman is a central figure in the Swedish ballad tradition and a powerful influence in Swedish music, known for his 1790 Fredman's Epistles and his 1791 Fredman's Songs. A solo entertainer, he played the cittern, accompanying himself as he performed his songs at the royal court.

Jean Fredman (1712 or 1713–1767) was a real watchmaker of Bellman's Stockholm. The fictional Fredman, alive after 1767, but without employment, is the supposed narrator in Bellman's epistles and songs. The epistles, written and performed in different styles, from drinking songs and laments to pastorales, paint a complex picture of the life of the city during the 18th century. A frequent theme is the demimonde, with Fredman's cheerfully drunk Order of Bacchus, a loose company of ragged men who favour strong drink and prostitutes. At the same time as depicting this realist side of life, Bellman creates a rococo picture, full of classical allusion, following the French post-Baroque poets. The women, including the beautiful Ulla Winblad, are "nymphs", while Neptune's festive troop of followers and sea-creatures sport in Stockholm's waters. The juxtaposition of elegant and low life is humorous, sometimes burlesque, but always graceful and sympathetic. The songs are "most ingeniously" set to their music, which is nearly always borrowed and skilfully adapted.

== Song ==
=== Music and verse form ===
Melody of Epistle 72
The Epistle's "languorous and intense" melody

The music is in 2/4 time, and is marked Andante. There are three verses of 11 lines each, the final line being repeated da capo to make 12 lines in all. The rhyming pattern is AA-BB-CC-DD-FFF. The melody is an ariette from an opéra comique, Le peintre amoureux de son modèle by the Italian composer Egidio Duni, which in 1782 was translated into Swedish as Målaren kär i sin modell ("The painter in love with his model"). It had the timbre "Maudit Amour, raison severe" ("Cursed Love, severe Reason").

=== Lyrics ===
Although first published in 1790 with the other epistles, Glimmande nymf came to Bellman in 1771, in one of his first attempts at songwriting. The initial version was direct in its description, telling the nymph to "Lay on this chair your robe, trousers, cardigan and skirt". It culminated in an account of the "little death" (orgasm): "Jag leker och tager/ Svimmar, somnar, suckar dör/ Cajsa Lisa mig tillhör." (I play and take/ Faint, fall asleep, sigh, die/ Caisa Lisa belongs to me.) These lines were replaced with a more innocent but still clearly erotic narrative. To convey the desired mood, Bellman creates a rainbow — after sunset: realism is abandoned for poetic effect. Bellman's biographer, Paul Britten Austin, comments that the reader "does not even notice": "Never mind. It is a beautiful scene, even if its chronology calls for much poetic license."

Versions of the first verse
Carl Michael Bellman, 1790	Eva Toller's prose, 2004	Paul Britten Austin's verse, 1967
Glimmande Nymph! blixtrande öga! Sväfvande Hamn på bolstrarna höga! Menlösa styrka! Kom, kom nu at dyrka, Vid et smalt och utsläckt ljus, Sömnens Gud, vår Morpheus. Luckan ren stängd, Porten tilsluten, Natthufvan ren din hjässa kringknuten, Ren Norströms pisk-peruk den hänger på sin spik. |: Sof, somna in vid min Musik. :|	Glittering nymph, (with) flashing eyes, soaring apparation on the high feather-bed, benevolent strength, come, come now to worship by a thin and extinguished candle the god of sleep, our Morpheus! The shutter is already closed, the gate is locked, the nightcap is fastened 'round the crown of your head; already Norström's wig hangs on its hook. |: Sleep, fall asleep to my music! :|	Glimmering nymph, glances so sparkling Hovering wraith on pillows darkling, Innocent temptress Come, come now to vespers; By a candle's waxy heap, Morpheus worship, god of sleep Lock'd is the door, the shutter in place is; Drowsy thy head a nightcap embraces; Now Norström's old peruque Its rusty nail doth seek. |: Slumber, sweet nymph, to my musique! :|

== Reception ==
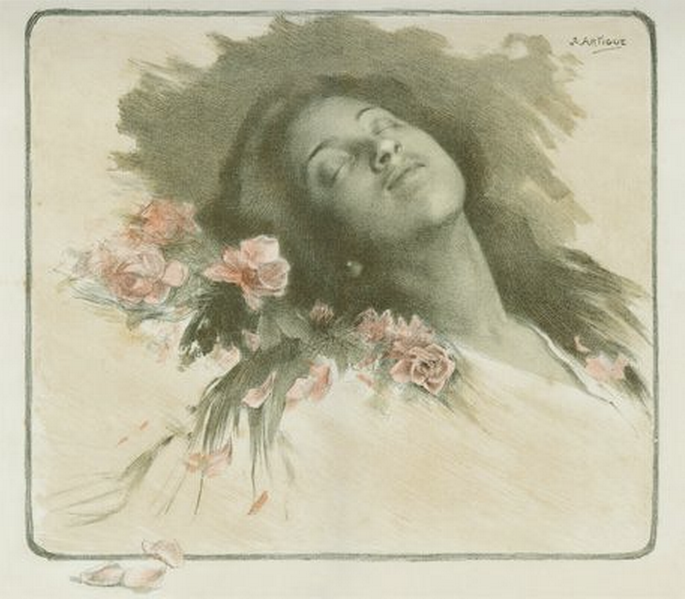
To a sleeping "nymph". Print, Sleeping woman, by Albert-Émile Artigue, 1899

Britten Austin describes the song as "A lovely night-piece, its exquisite delicacy is best appreciated when considered against the background of its hushed and fragile music." He suggests that although the song names the "nymph" as Caisa Lisa, "one cannot but feel" that the real heroine is Ulla Winblad, who is for example called a nymph in epistle 28. The real Ulla, Maja-Stina Kiellström, aged 27 in June 1771, had become famous as a sexy figure in Bellman's epistles, making her close to unmarriageable, so Bellman found a job for her fiancé, Eric Nordström, and the couple were able to marry.

The scholar of literature Lars Lönnroth writes that the "languorous and intense" melody was originally for an aria about a lover's struggle between the personified "Love" and "Reason". Love draws him to the beloved; Reason tells him he will regret it. He notes that Fredman, too, is pulled to and fro by the same two forces. The "obscene details" of the 1771 version were replaced in the printed 1790 text with a description of the surroundings and a lyricism that at on the surface, he writes, make the song more seemly; the mood is "less burlesque and more inward". The musical setting, too, was changed, removing the instrumental imitation of the action. Still, even without the "erotically arousing striptease", the song's structure was unchanged, and the goddess of love is still present, with "I to Freya's worship go" instead of the frank account of Cajsa Stina as "a diligent temple maid" in Freya's temple, so, Lönnroth writes, it is open to question whether the printed version was much more proper. The retouching, however, in Lönnroth's view converted "a semi-pornographic bedroom farce", including a collapsing bed, to high erotic art complete with Orphean nature-mysticism, making the song "a demonstration of poetry's ability to immortalise".

Bellman's biographer, Carina Burman, writes that the song's lyrical depiction of the delights of sexual intercourse is one of the real jewels of Swedish literature, but that the summer 1771 draft differs markedly from the final version. The first verse invited the nymph to lay her clothes on a chair and fall asleep to "my violin", which Burman describes as phallic, rather than noting prosaically that Norström's wig was hanging on its hook, and inviting Norström's wife to go to sleep to "my music". The second verse, too, is much toned down in the familiar final version. The verse ended not with the account of the rainbow, but with an exhortation to the nymph to open her bed and to hear "my violin, strong as a bassoon". Burman comments that the violin comes out again, strong and erect.

Epistle 72 has been recorded by Fred Åkerström as the title track on his album called Glimmande nymf, and by Cornelis Vreeswijk.

== Sources ==
- Bellman, Carl Michael (1790). Fredmans epistlar. Stockholm: By Royal Privilege. Archived from the original on 2019-04-15.
- Britten Austin, Paul (1967). The Life and Songs of Carl Michael Bellman: Genius of the Swedish Rococo. New York: Allhem, Malmö American-Scandinavian Foundation. ISBN 978-3-932759-00-0.
- Burman, Carina (2019). Bellman. Biografin [Bellman: The Biography] (in Swedish). Stockholm: Albert Bonniers Förlag. ISBN 978-9100141790.
- Hassler, Göran; Dahl, Peter (illus.) (1989). Bellman – en antologi [Bellman – an anthology]. En bok för alla. ISBN 91-7448-742-6. Archived from the original on 2019-03-30. (contains the most popular epistles and songs, in Swedish, with sheet music)
- Kleveland, Åse; Ehrén, Svenolov (illus.) (1984). Fredmans epistlar & sånger [The songs and epistles of Fredman]. Stockholm: Informationsförlaget. ISBN 91-7736-059-1. Archived from the original on 2019-03-30. (with facsimiles of sheet music from first editions in 1790, 1791)
- Lönnroth, Lars (2005). Ljuva karneval! : om Carl Michael Bellmans diktning [Lovely Carnival! : about Carl Michael Bellman's Verse]. Stockholm: Albert Bonniers Förlag. ISBN 978-91-0-057245-7. OCLC 61881374.
- Massengale, James Rhea (1979). The Musical-Poetic Method of Carl Michael Bellman. Stockholm: Almqvist & Wiksell International. ISBN 91-554-0849-4.
