= Astrild =

Nordic name for Amor or Cupid

Astrild (from Old Norse: "Love-fire") is a relatively late Nordic name for Amor or Cupid. Astrild probably originated in the writings of the 17th-century Swedish poet Georg Stiernhielm, and has since been used in Nordic poetry, mainly during the Baroque and Rococo eras, such as in Carl Michael Bellman's 1790 Fredman's Epistles. Astrild does not appear in Norse mythology, even though the name was used before Stiernhielm as a synonym for the estrildid finches.

== See also ==
- Jofur
