= Carina Burman =

Swedish novelist and literary scholar (born 1960)

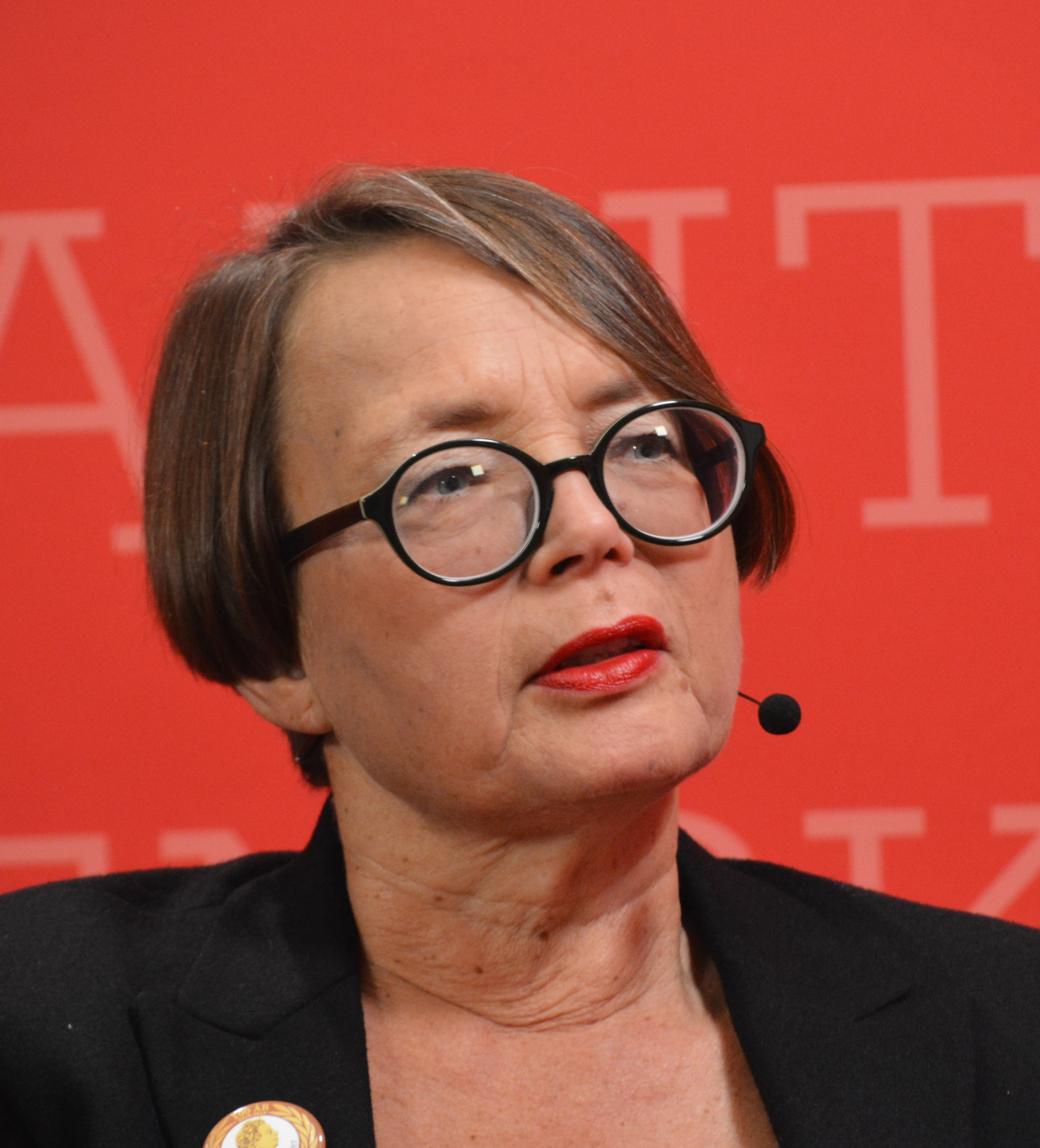
Burman at the Gothenburg book fair in 2019

Carina Burman (born 1960) is a Swedish novelist and literature scholar. Her research has been focused on Swedish 18th and 19th century literature. She completed her Ph.D. in literature in Uppsala in 1988 with a dissertation on the Gustavian writer Johan Henric Kellgren. Later production includes a critical edition of previously unpublished letters of the novelist and feminist pioneer Fredrika Bremer in two volumes (1996) and a biography of Bremer (2001).

Together with her husband, Professor Lars Burman, she has published critical editions on behalf of the Swedish Academy of the works of Johan Henric Kellgren (1995), Fredrika Bremer's "Livet i gamla världen. Palestina" (1995) and the poetic works of Erik Gustaf Geijer (1999). Carina and Lars Burman edited Bremer's "Grannarne" for the series of Swedish literature published by Svenska Vitterhetssamfundet (2000).

Her book Bellman. Biografin ("Bellman. The Biography") is a 2019 biography of the Swedish 18th-century songwriter and performer Carl Michael Bellman. It has been described as ambitious by its many reviewers, who have admired its lively style and the detailed academic research on which it is based. Some have found its definitive-sounding title provocative, as it is not the first biography of Bellman; others, that it says little about his music, although he was at once a poet and a musician.

Burman's novels have historical motifs, often taking the form of a pastiche. Her first, "Min salig bror Jean Hendrich" (1993) deals with Johan Henric Kellgren from the point of view of his brother and his mistress in a series of letters. Her latest two novels, "Babylons gator" (2004) and "Vit som marmor" (2006) have the form of detective novels. "Babylons gator: Ett Londonmysterum" (The Streets of Babylon: A London Mystery), which borrows from English novels of the Victorian period, has Euthanasia Bondeson, a Swedish woman novelist-amateur sleuth visiting London, as its main character. In "Vit som marmor" (White as marble), Euthanasia Bondeson travels to Rome and solves a murder mystery in the Scandinavian artist colony.

== Publications ==
=== Monographs ===
- Vältalaren Johan Henric Kellgren, Skrifter utgivna av Avdelningen för litteratursociologi vid Litteraturvetenskapliga institutionen i Uppsala, 23 (dissertation, Uppsala, 1988)
- Mamsellen och förläggarna. Fredrika Bremers förlagskontakter 1828-1865, Litteratur och samhälle 30:1, Avd. för litteratursociologi, Uppsala Universitet, 1995.
- Bremer. En biografi (Stockholm, 2001)
- Den finländska Sapfo. Catharina Charlotta Swedenmarcks liv och verk (Uppsala, 2004)
- Dubbelt öl ger gott humör (Uppsala University Library, 2015)
- Bellman. Biografin (Stockholm, 2019) on the life of the poet and performer Carl Michael Bellman

=== Critical editions ===
- Fredrika Bremer, Grannarne, utgiven med inledning och kommentarer av Carina och Lars Burman. Svenska Författare. Ny serie. Svenska Vitterhetssamfundet (Stockholm, 2000).
- Erik Gustaf Geijer, Dikter, under redaktion av Carina och Lars Burman och med inledning av Torgny Segerstedt. Svenska klassiker utgivna av Svenska Akademien (Stockholm, 1999).
- Fredrika Bremer, Brev. Ny följd I-II. Tidigare ej samlade och tryckta brev utgivna av Carina Burman (Gidlunds förlag, Hedemora, 1996)
- Fredrika Bremer, Livet i gamla världen. Palestina, under redaktion av Carina och Lars Burman och med inledning av Knut Ahnlund. Svenska klassiker utgivna av Svenska Akademien (Stockholm, 1995).
- Johan Henric Kellgren, Skrifter I-II, under redaktion av Carina och Lars Burman och med inledning av Torgny Segerstedt. Svenska klassiker utgivna av Svenska Akademien (Stockholm, 1995).

=== Novels ===
- Min salig bror Jean Hendrich (1993)
- Den tionde sånggudinnan (1996)
- Cromwells huvud (1998)
- Islandet (2001)
- Babylons gator (2004)
- Vit som marmor (2006)
- Hästen från Porten (2008)
- Kärleksroman (2009)
- God natt, madame (2021)

== Awards and distinctions ==
- 2001 – Lundequist bookshop's literature prize
- 2002 – Tegnér prize
- 2007 – Lotten von Kraemer's prize
- 2008 – Birger Schöldström's prize
- 2015 – Eric och Ingrid Lilliehöök's stipend
- 2017 – Disa prize
