= Jean Fredman =

Swedish watchmaker

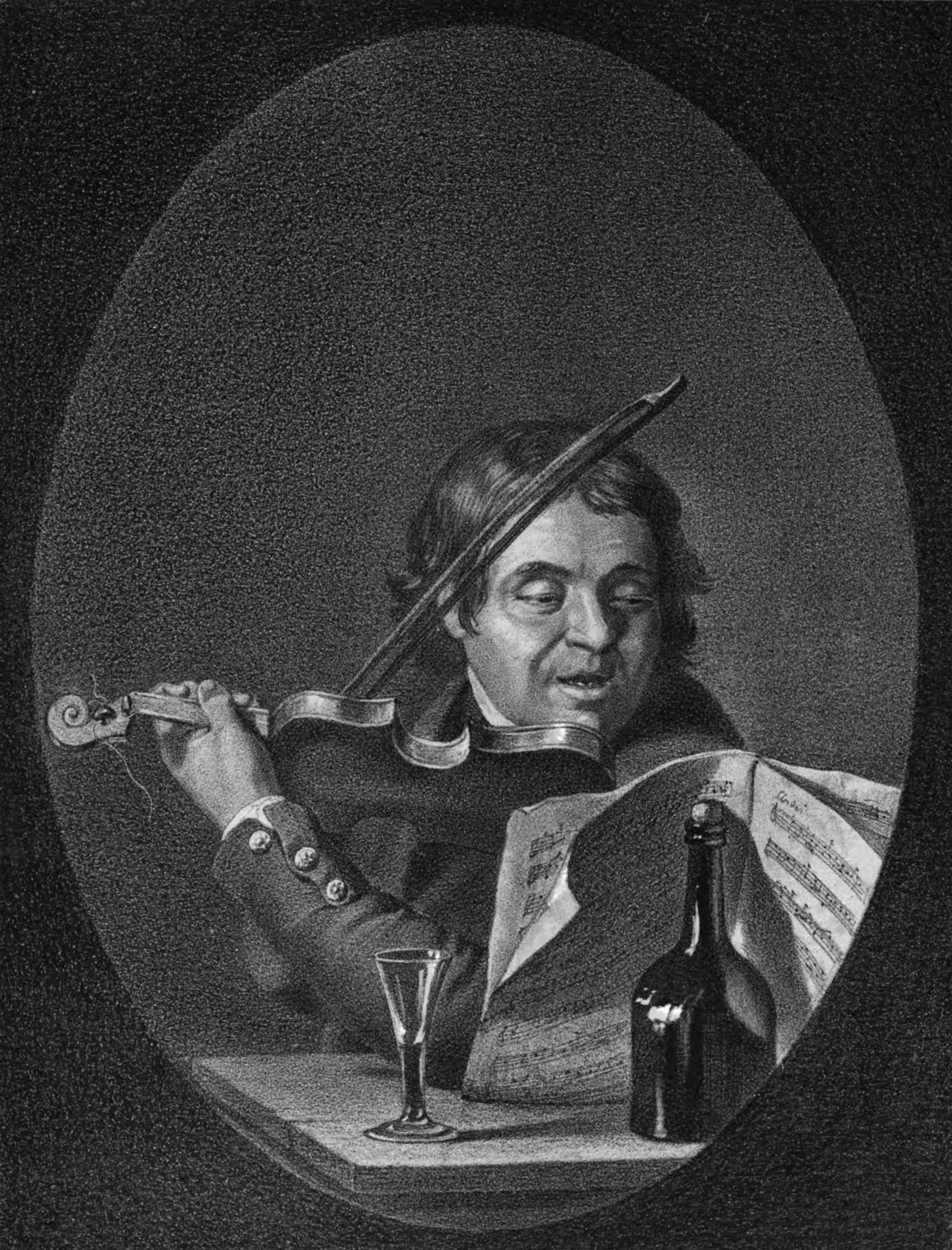
Lithograph of Fredman by Pehr Hilleström, 1865

Jean Fredman (born Johan Fredrik Fredman; 1712 or 1713 – 9 May 1767) was a figure in 18th century Stockholm. He was the son of the watchmaker Andreas Fredman from his first marriage. He later also became a watchmaker, after being his father's apprentice. In the year 1745 he married a wealthy widow named Katarina Lindberg. Between the husband and wife there took place a buzzed-about legal process as Fredman had embezzled his wife's money.

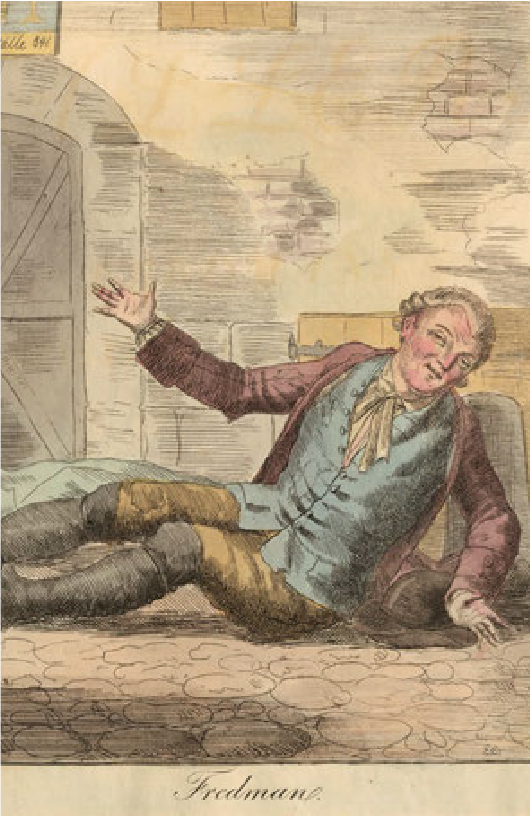
Fredman by Elis Chiewitz, before 1839

In 1752, things started to go worse for Fredman as his wife died. This signalled the start of numerous events that would leave him poor and on the streets before his death on 6 May 1767.

Jean Fredman is the key figure in Carl Michael Bellman's works from the 18th century, the Songs of Fredman and the Epistles of Fredman. Bellman let Fredman be the supposed narrator of his songs and poems. Originally it was thought that Fredman would play a part similar to that of the apostle Paul in the Bible, writing epistles to his "congregation". The first song about Fredman was about his funeral, and would later become number 26 in Songs of Fredman.

== Sources ==
- Britten Austin, Paul (1967). Carl Michael Bellman. Allhem.
- Lönnroth, Lars (2005). Ljuva karneval! : om Carl Michael Bellmans diktning [Lovely Carnival! : about Carl Michael Bellman's Verse]. Stockholm: Albert Bonniers Förlag. ISBN 978-91-0-057245-7. OCLC 61881374.
