= James Massengale =

American musicologist

James Rhea Massengale is an American musicologist and former professor at UCLA, who has specialised in the Swedish poets Carl Michael Bellman and Olof von Dalin. He is a member of the Royal Swedish Academy of Music. He was educated at Yale University (BA 1961), Cambridge University (MA 1968), and Harvard University (PhD in Scandinavian literature 1972). He was a professor at UCLA from 1970 to his retirement in 2006.

== Works ==
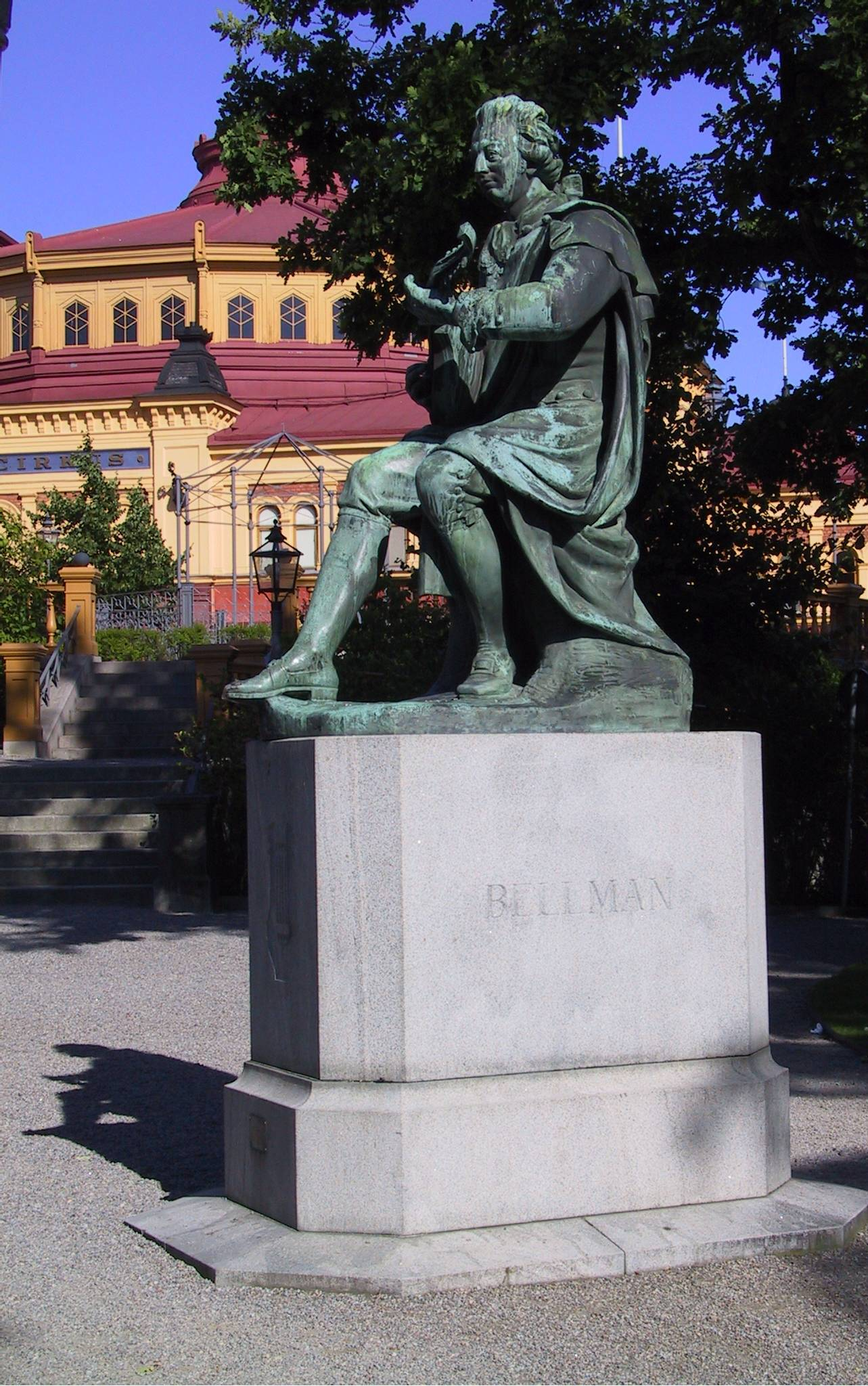
The Swedish Gustavian age poet and performer, Carl Michael Bellman, Massengale's specialty

- Massengale, James Rhea (1972). The musical-poetic method of Carl Michael Bellman. Cambridge, Massachusetts.
- Massengale, James Rhea (1979). Systerligt förente: en studie i Bellmans musikalisk-poetiska teknik. Kungl. Musikaliska akademiens skriftseries, 0347-5158; 25 (in Swedish). Stockholm: Musikaliska akad. ISBN 91-85428-13-2.
- Massengale, James Rhea (1988). Analytical song index for C.M. Bellman's poetry. Meddelanden från Svenskt visarkiv, 0081-9832; 46. Stockholm: Svenskt visarkiv. ISBN 91-85374-20-2.
- Bellman, Carl Michael (1990). Fredmans epistlar: text- och melodihistorisk utgåva med musiken i reproduktion efter originaltrycket. 1, Texten (in Swedish). Hillbom Gunnar, Massengale James Rhea. Stockholm: Norstedt i samarbete med Bellmanssällsk. ISBN 91-1-893962-7.
- Bellman, Carl Michael (1990). Fredmans epistlar: text- och melodihistorisk utgåva med musiken i reproduktion efter originaltrycket. 2, Musiken och kommentarer (in Swedish). Hillbom Gunnar, Massengale James Rhea. Stockholm: Norstedt i samarbete med Bellmanssällsk. ISBN 91-1-894192-3.
- Bellman, Carl Michael (1992). Fredmans sånger: text- och melodihistorisk utgåva med musiken i reproduktion efter originaltrycket. 1, Texten (in Swedish). Hillbom Gunnar, Massengale James Rhea. Stockholm: Norstedt i samarbete med Bellmanssällsk. ISBN 91-1-919452-8.
- Bellman, Carl Michael (1992). Fredmans sånger: text- och melodihistorisk utgåva med musiken i reproduktion efter originaltrycket. 2, Musik och kommentarer (in Swedish). Hillbom Gunnar, Massengale James Rhea. Stockholm: Norstedt i samarbete med Bellmanssällsk. ISBN 91-1-919462-5.
- Massengale, James Rhea (1992). "Bellmanssången och Bellmanssångare". Carl Michael Bellman. Text- och kommentarh. Stockholm : Musica Sveciae, p 1992: 31–38.
- Massengale, James Rhea (1996). "The songs of Olof von Dalin". Scandinavian Studies. 1996 (68). Lawrence, Kan., etc : Allen Press, etc., 1911-: [415]-460 : musiknoter. ISSN 0036-5637.
- Massengale, James Rhea (2001). "Bellman, Haydn och suddig logik". Sångens poetik / [redaktörer Ann-Mari Häggman och Lars Huldén]. Vasa : Finlands svenska folkmusikinstitut, 2001: 143–174.
- Massengale, James Rhea (2009). Vad betyder Dalins melodier?: anförande vid Svenska Vitterhetssamfundets yearsmöte den 21 maj 2008 (in Swedish). Stockholm: Svenska Vitterhetssamfundet. ISBN 978-91-7230-148-1.
- Carlsson, Ingemar (2009). Kommentar till dramatik. Svenska författare utgivna av Svenska vitterhetssamfundet, 0346-7864; 26Samlade skrifter; 4 (in Swedish). Massengale James Rhea. Stockholm: Svenska vitterhetssamfundet. ISBN 978-91-7230-150-4.
