= Kära syster =

Song by the 18th century Swedish bard Carl Michael Bellman

"Kära Syster"
- Art song by Bellman, music reworked from Egidio Duni
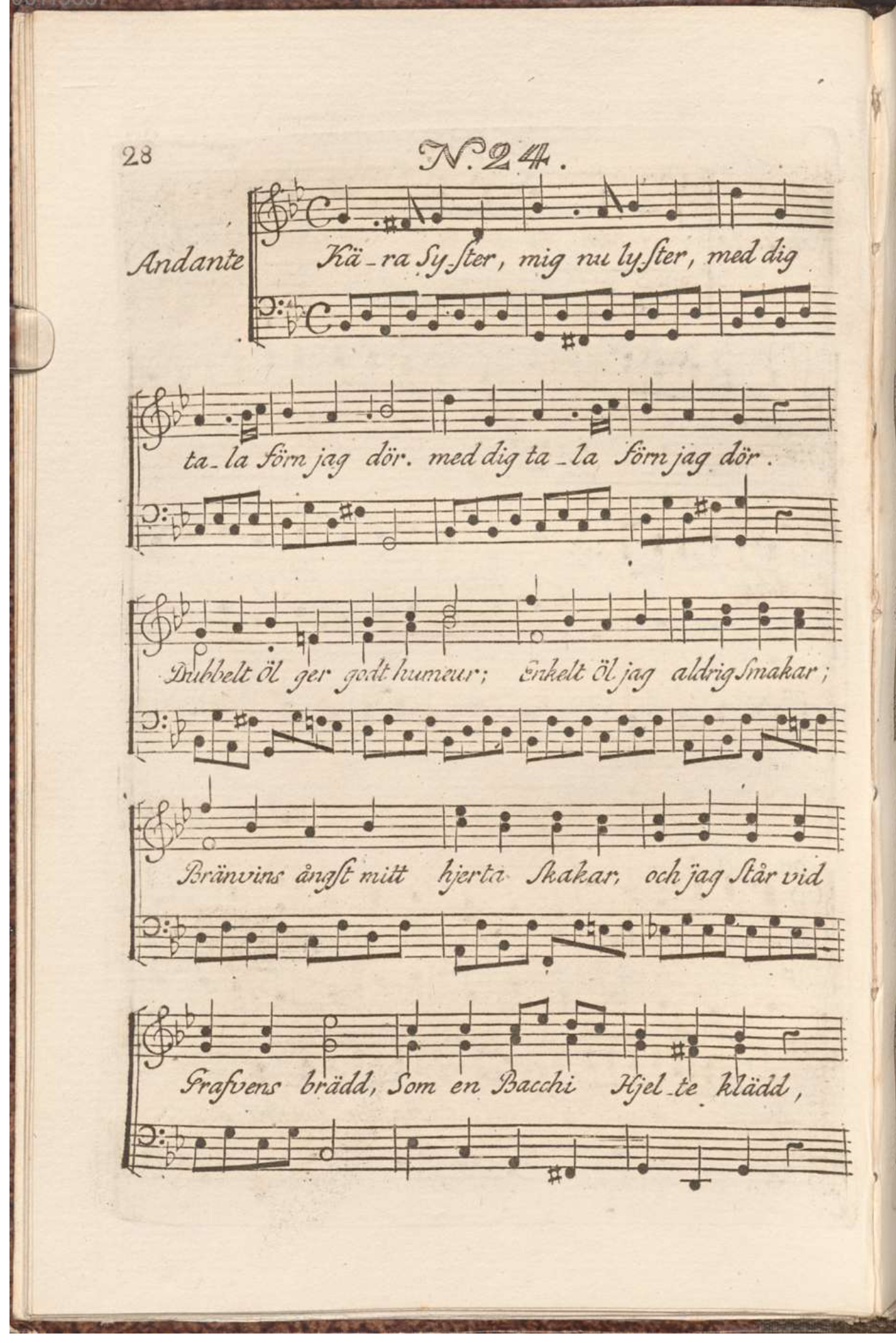
- First page of sheet music, 1810 reprint
- English: Dear Sister
- Written: May 1770
- Text: poem by Carl Michael Bellman
- Language: Swedish
- Published: 1790 in Fredman's Epistles
- Scoring: voice and cittern

Kära Syster (Dear Sister) is No. 24 in the Swedish poet and performer Carl Michael Bellman's 1790 song collection, Fredman's Epistles. The epistle is subtitled "Till kära mor på Bruna Dörren" ("To dear mother at The Brown Door [Tavern]"); its themes are drinking and death. One of his best-known works, it is set to a tune extensively modified from one by Egidio Duni for Louis Anseaume's 1766 song-play La Clochette. Bellman's biographer, Carina Burman, calls it a central epistle.

This was the sixth epistle to be written, and the first not to be continuously cheerful. The narrator, Fredman, encounters the ferryman of the underworld, Charon, and the theme of death is repeated with the ticking of the watch that measures out Fredman the watchmaker's life. Fredman's world, here as in many later epistles, has two sides: one is drunkenness, dance, and love; the other is angst, hangovers, and a longing for death. Kära Syster has accordingly been called a central epistle. The borrowed melody has been adapted with as much work as creating a new one, implying to scholars that Bellman intended a humorous contrast between the familiar melody and the epistle's sombre theme.

== Context ==
Carl Michael Bellman is a central figure in the Swedish ballad tradition and a powerful influence in Swedish music, known for his 1790 Fredman's Epistles and his 1791 Fredman's Songs. A solo entertainer, he played the cittern, accompanying himself as he performed his songs at the royal court.

Jean Fredman (1712 or 1713–1767) was a real watchmaker of Bellman's Stockholm. The fictional Fredman, alive after 1767, but without employment, is the supposed narrator in Bellman's epistles and songs. The epistles, written and performed in different styles, from drinking songs and laments to pastorales, paint a complex picture of the life of the city during the 18th century. A frequent theme is the demimonde, with Fredman's cheerfully drunk Order of Bacchus, a loose company of ragged men who favour strong drink and prostitutes. At the same time as depicting this realist side of life, Bellman creates a rococo picture, full of classical allusion, following the French post-Baroque poets. The women, including the beautiful Ulla Winblad, are "nymphs", while Neptune's festive troop of followers and sea-creatures sport in Stockholm's waters. The juxtaposition of elegant and low life is humorous, sometimes burlesque, but always graceful and sympathetic. The songs are "most ingeniously" set to their music, which is nearly always borrowed and skilfully adapted.

== Song ==
=== Music and verse form ===
Melody of Epistle 24

The epistle was written between March and May 1770. There are 3 stanzas, each of twenty lines; the third line is repeated when sung. The rhyming scheme is AAB-BCC-DDDD-AAE-EFF-GHGH. Its time signature is 4/4, with its tempo marked Andante.

The melody has been attributed to a duet, "A la fête du Village", from Egidio Duni's music for Louis Anseaume's 1766 song-play La Clochette, but the musicologist James Massengale states that while that timbre is not "incorrect", the epistle cannot be sung to that tune. Massengale analyses the elaborate changes that Bellman made to the Anseaume-Duni melody, including splitting the music for Colinette's part of the song and placing it at the start and end of the epistle, certainly in his view a conscious reworking. He says that the changes must have cost "an enormous amount of labor ... not to mention the musical talent that was necessary to bring about such change successfully". He notes that Bellman could well have seen the French production of La Clochette at Bollhuset which ran from 1767 to 1769, so there is no need to propose a Swedish variant of the melody for Bellman to have heard.

=== Lyrics ===
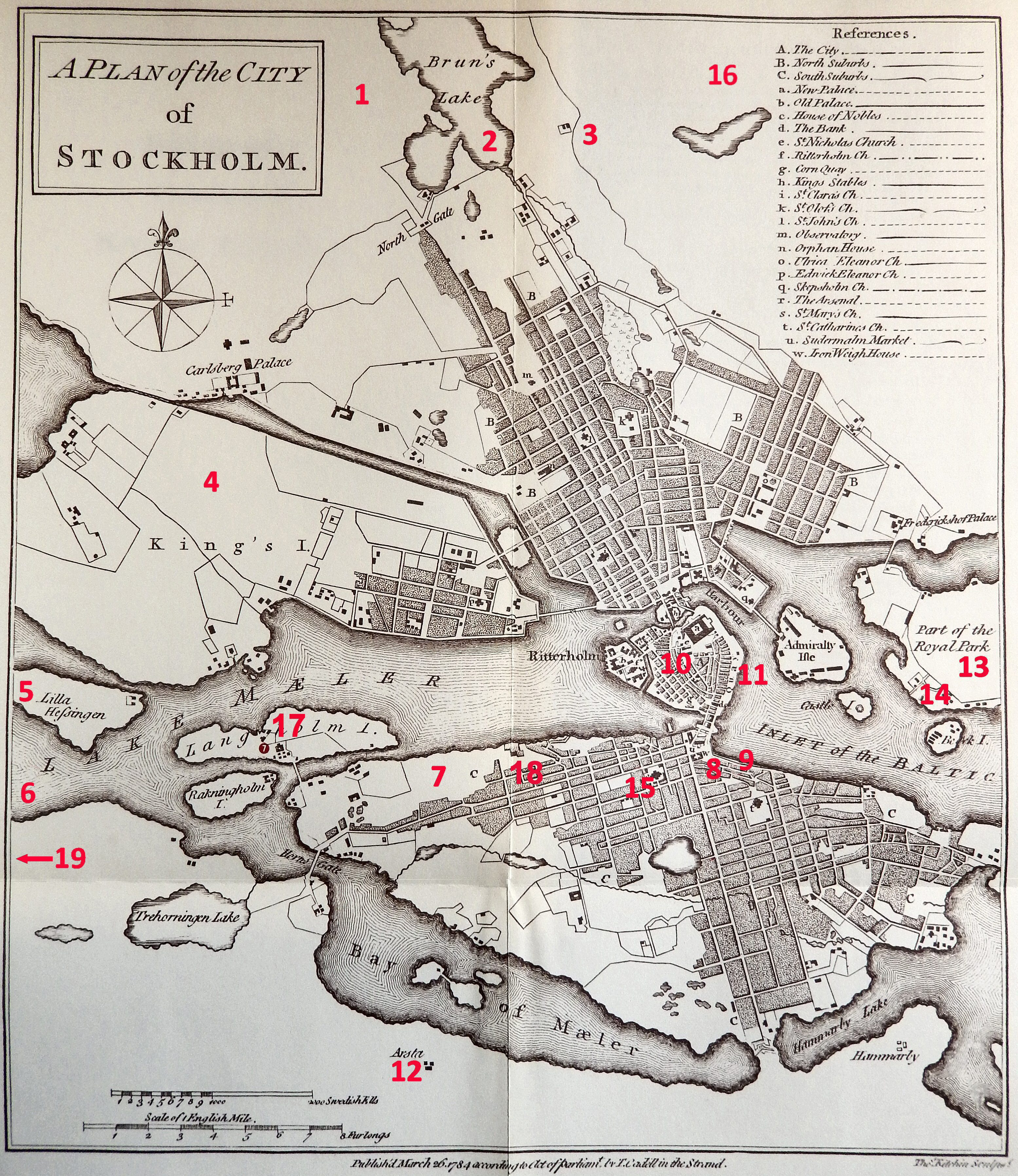
Map of Bellman's Stockholm, places of interest for his Fredman's Epistles and Songs on map from William Coxe's Travels into Poland, Russia, Sweden, and Denmark, 1784. 1 Haga park (S. 64) – 2 Brunnsviken – 3 Första Torpet (Ep. 80) – 4 Kungsholmen – 5 Hessingen (Ep. 48) – 6 Lake Mälaren (Ep. 48) – 7 Södermalm – 8 Urvädersgränd – 9 Lokatten tavern (Ep. 11, Ep. 59, Ep. 77), Bruna Dörren tavern (Ep. 24, Ep. 38) – 10 Gamla stan (Ep. 5, Ep. 9, Ep. 23, Ep. 28, Ep. 79) – 11 Skeppsbron Quay (Ep. 33) – 12 Årsta Castle – 13 Djurgården Park – (Ep. 25, Ep. 51, Ep. 82) – 14 Gröna Lund (Ep. 12, Ep. 62) – 15 Bellman's birthplace – 16 Fiskartorpet (Ep. 71) – 17 Lilla Sjötullen (Bellmanmuseet) (Ep. 48) – 18 Bensvarvars tavern (Ep. 40) 19 Rostock tavern (Ep. 45)

The epistle is set in the Bruna Dörren tavern, which stood on Stockholm's Stadsgården wharf to the southeast of Gamla stan, the old town. The drunkard Fredman confronts his imminent death.

The first stanza of epistle 24
Carl Michael Bellman, 1790

Kära syster!
Mig nu lyster
Med dig tala förr'n jag dör. :||:
Dubbelt Öl ger godt humör;
Enkelt Öl jag aldrig smakar;
Bränvins ångst mit hjerta skakar,
Och jag står vid grafvens brädd
Som en Bacchi hjelte klädd,
Men föragtad och försmädd,
För min egen skugga rädd.
Kära syster!
Mig nu lyster
At få taga mig en sup;
Sen gå i mit mörka djup.
Uret pickar,
Charon skickar
Slup.
Tag mig den och den,
Kära mor, jag hickar;
Bacchi safter fröjda mig än.

Eva Toller's prose

Dear sister,
I now want
to talk to you, ere I die. :||:
Strong ale gives a good temper;
weak ale I never touch;
the anguish of liquor shakes my heart,
and I stand at the edge of my grave,
dressed like a hero of Bacchus,
but despised and disdained,
frightened of my own shadow.
Dearest sister,
now I have a good mind
to have a drink;
(and) then, to walk into my dark depth.
The clock is ticking, (and)
Charon sends
his sloop (for me).
Well, I'll be damned;
dear Mother, I'm hiccuping;
the juices of Bacchus, they still delight me.

== Reception ==
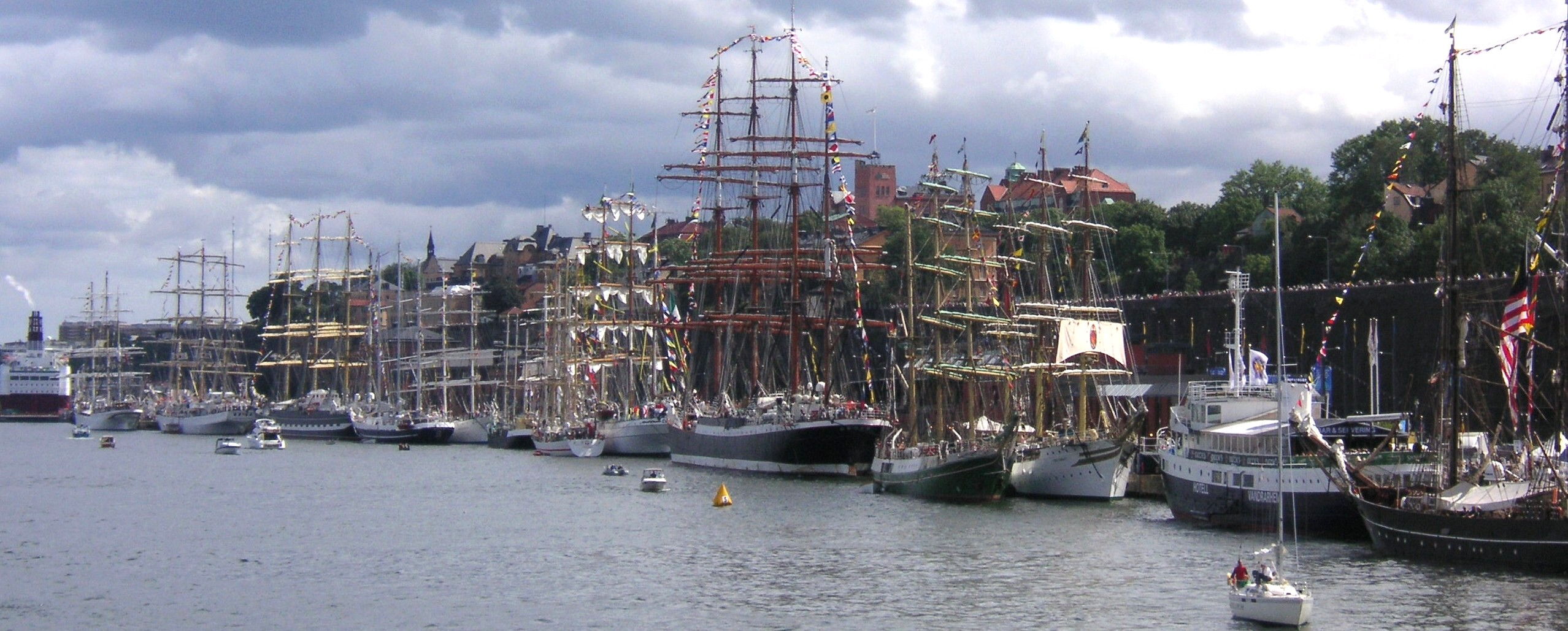
The Bruna Dörren tavern stood on Stockholm's Stadsgården, seen here during The Tall Ships' Races in 2007, recalling its appearance in Bellman's time.

The Bellman scholar Lars Lönnroth writes that this was the sixth epistle to be written, but that unlike the earlier five, the mood is not continuously cheerful, and Fredman does not appear as a letter-writing apostle: instead, he plays the role of a desperate confessor in front of a housewife at the tavern. Although he claims to be dressed as a "hero of Bacchus", he feels rejected and afraid of his own shadow. In the song, the ferryman Charon appears for the first time, ready to carry Fredman to the realm of the dead. The theme of death is repeated in the watch that measures his time, at the same time as it is connected to his previous work as a watchmaker and symbolizes his beating heart. Bellman soon put Charon in a text about the Order of Bacchus, which became Fredman's song No. 5.

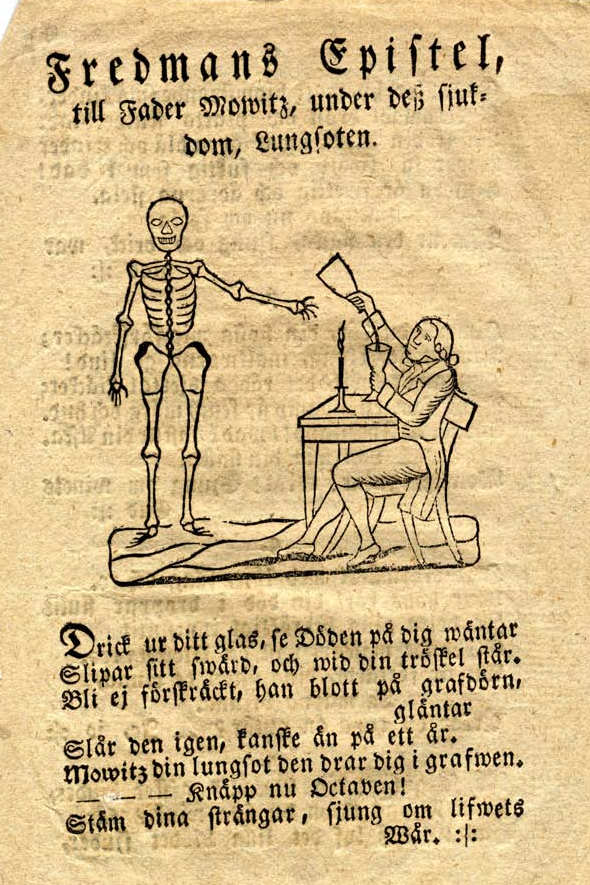
Even with Death calling him to the underworld, Fredman has one last drink. Shilling print of epistle 30, "Drick ur ditt glas".

The scholar of Swedish literature, Carina Burman, writes in her biography of Bellman that Fredman's world has two sides: one is drunkenness, dance, and love; the other is angst, hangovers, and a longing for death. She calls Kära syster "a central epistle", stating that in 1770, Bellman must have been driven by his idea of Fredman, and wrote like a man possessed. The epistle, she writes, sees Fredman speculating about the world after his death, when he has been "embalmed by Bacchus", but even as a dead man he cannot imagine leaving his tavern, asking that when his ghost returns to the Bruna Dörren, the barmaids are not to be mean with his drink. She notes the paradoxes in all this: the real Fredman had already died, but was still flourishing in Bellman's imagined present-day Stockholm; while at the end of the epistle, the fictionalised Fredman is dying, but is begging for a drink (of brandy) so that he won't die of thirst. She notes that in epistle 79, "Charon i Luren tutar", written 1785, Fredman again hears Charon calling, and there he says his farewell to the barmaids of another pub, Maja Myra's tavern on Solgränd off Stortorget in Stockholm's Gamla stan; "with one foot in Charon's boat, Fredman drains his last glass" – but it is not brandy but ale, and it runs down his clothes: before death, he is baptised in the almost magical fluid.

The musicologist James Massengale writes that although the melody was borrowed, the amount of work that Bellman had to put into the music for this epistle, as for no. 12 ("Gråt Fader Berg och spela") was "surely tantamount to the production of new melodies." Borrowing was accepted, even encouraged at the time, but the "poetic possibility", Massengale suggests, is that Bellman wished to exploit the humorous contrast between a melody of one type and a story of another, or between an existing image associated with the melody, and a fresh one presented in an epistle. In addition, Bellman was able to use what his audience knew to be borrowed music to reinforce the historical flavour of the epistles, introducing exactly the kind of ambiguity that he was seeking.

The song has been recorded by Bellman interpreter Fred Åkerström on his 1969 album Fred sjunger Bellman, by the Dutch interpreter of Bellman Cornelis Vreeswijk on his 1971 studio album Spring mot Ulla, spring! Cornelis sjunger Bellman, and by the actor Mikael Samuelsson on his 1988 album Carl Michael Bellman.

== Sources ==
- Bellman, Carl Michael (1790). Fredmans epistlar. Stockholm: By Royal Privilege.
- Britten Austin, Paul (1967). The Life and Songs of Carl Michael Bellman: Genius of the Swedish Rococo. New York: Allhem, Malmö American-Scandinavian Foundation. ISBN 978-3-932759-00-0.
- Burman, Carina (2019). Bellman. Biografin [Bellman: The Biography] (in Swedish). Stockholm: Albert Bonniers Förlag. ISBN 978-9100141790.
- Hassler, Göran; Dahl, Peter (illus.) (1989). Bellman – en antologi [Bellman – an anthology]. En bok för alla. ISBN 91-7448-742-6. (contains the most popular epistles and songs, in Swedish, with sheet music)
- Kleveland, Åse; Ehrén, Svenolov (illus.) (1984). Fredmans epistlar & sånger [The songs and epistles of Fredman]. Stockholm: Informationsförlaget. ISBN 91-7736-059-1. (with facsimiles of sheet music from first editions in 1790, 1791)
- Lönnroth, Lars (2005). Ljuva karneval! : om Carl Michael Bellmans diktning [Lovely Carnival! : about Carl Michael Bellman's Verse]. Stockholm: Albert Bonniers Förlag. ISBN 978-91-0-057245-7. OCLC 61881374.
- Massengale, James Rhea (1979). The Musical-Poetic Method of Carl Michael Bellman. Stockholm: Almqvist & Wiksell International. ISBN 91-554-0849-4.
