= Charon i Luren tutar =

Song by the 18th century Swedish bard Carl Michael Bellman

"Movitz blåste en konsert"
- Art song
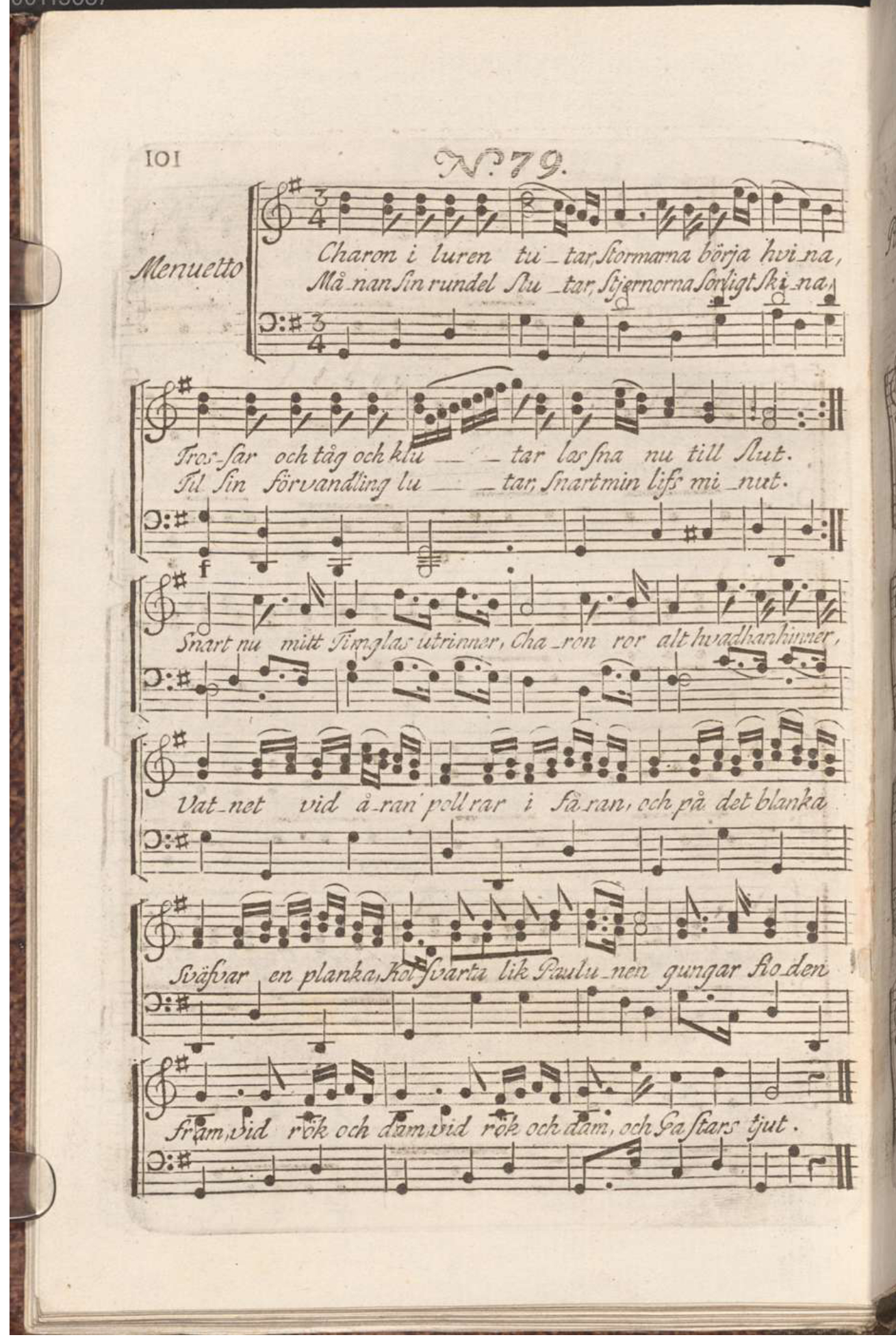
- First page of sheet music
- English: Charon blows his horn
- Written: 1785
- Text: poem by Carl Michael Bellman
- Language: Swedish
- Published: 1790 in Fredman's Epistles
- Scoring: voice and cittern

Charon i Luren tutar (Charon blows his horn) is epistle No. 79 in the Swedish poet and performer Carl Michael Bellman's 1790 song collection, Fredman's Epistles. The epistle is subtitled "Afsked til Matronorna, synnerligen til Mor Maja Myra i Solgränden vid Stortorget, Anno 1785" (Farewell to the Matrons, especially to Mother Maja Myra in Solgränd by Stortorget, Anno 1785). The song describes Jean Fredman's departure from the world.

The ferryman of the underworld in classical mythology, Charon, invites Fredman to come with him, suggesting to some scholars that Fredman had already died and crossed the River Styx, but had wandered back to his old haunts in Stockholm. Even as Charon fetches him, he drinks a mug of ale, a liquid that is ascribed almost magical properties; it runs down his clothes, so that before death Fredman is baptised in beer, recalling to scholars the sponge soaked in sour wine that refreshes Jesus on the cross. Scholars have noted the presence of the figure of Death in the epistle, accompanying his last revelries.

== Context ==
Carl Michael Bellman is a central figure in the Swedish ballad tradition and a powerful influence in Swedish music, known for his 1790 Fredman's Epistles and his 1791 Fredman's Songs. A solo entertainer, he played the cittern, accompanying himself as he performed his songs at the royal court.

Jean Fredman (1712 or 1713–1767) was a real watchmaker of Bellman's Stockholm. The fictional Fredman, alive after 1767, but without employment, is the supposed narrator in Bellman's epistles and songs. The epistles, written and performed in different styles, from drinking songs and laments to pastorales, paint a complex picture of the life of the city during the 18th century. A frequent theme is the demimonde, with Fredman's cheerfully drunk Order of Bacchus, a loose company of ragged men who favour strong drink and prostitutes. At the same time as depicting this realist side of life, Bellman creates a rococo picture, full of classical allusion, following the French post-Baroque poets. The women, including the beautiful Ulla Winblad, are "nymphs", while Neptune's festive troop of followers and sea-creatures sport in Stockholm's waters. The juxtaposition of elegant and low life is humorous, sometimes burlesque, but always graceful and sympathetic. The songs are "most ingeniously" set to their music, which is nearly always borrowed and skilfully adapted.

== Song ==
=== Music ===
Melody of Epistle 79
Bellman's tune for this late epistle

The song is in 3/4 time and is marked Menuetto, a tune for a courtly dance. It has 5 verses, each consisting of 17 lines. The rhyming pattern is ABAC-ABAC-DD-EEFFGG-C; the song was written in 1785 or soon afterwards. No source for the melody has been discovered.

=== Lyrics ===
The epistle is subtitled "Afsked til Matronorna, synnerligen til Mor Maja Myra i Solgränden vid Stortorget, Anno 1785" (Farewell to the Matrons, especially to Mother Maja Myra in Solgränd by Stortorget, Anno 1785). It describes Fredman's departure from the world, with allusions to Charon, who ferried the dead to the underworld in classical mythology.

First stanza
Swedish

Charon i Luren tutar,
Stormarna börja hvina,
Trossar och tåg och klutar
Lossna nu til slut;
Månan sin rundel slutar,
Stjernorna sorgligt skina,
Til sin förvandling lutar
Snart min lifsminut;
Snart nu mitt Timglas utrinner,
Charon ror alt hvad han hinner,
Vattnet vid åran,
Pollrar i fåran,
Och på det blanka
Sväfvar en Planka,
Kolsvarta Lik-paulunen gungar floden fram,
Vid rök och dam :||:
Och Gastars tjut.

Eva Toller's prose, 2009

Charon blows his horn,
the storms start to whine,
hawsers and ropes and knots,
(they) finally loosen now.
The moon ends its rounds,
the stars shine gloomily,
my life's path
soon will be changed.
Soon now, my time has run out;
Charon rows for all he's worth,
the water ripples
by the oars,
and on the clear (water),
a plank is floating,
the pitch-black hearse is rocking on the river,
by smoke and dust :||:
and the shrieks of ghosts.

John Irons's verse, 2020

Charon his horn is sounding,
Storm winds commence their howling,
Hawsers, ropes, sails start bounding
and come loose apace;
Moon's nightly round is ending
Stars gleam with dismal cowling,
To its great change is bending
Life's allotted space;
Soon will my hour-glass have emptied,
Charon's oars all have attempted,
Purling they burrow
Deep in each furrow,
Through bright waves sliding,
Death's bark is gliding,
Jet-black the funeral ferry down the river strokes
To dust and smoke :||:
And ghosts' loud bays.

== Reception and legacy ==
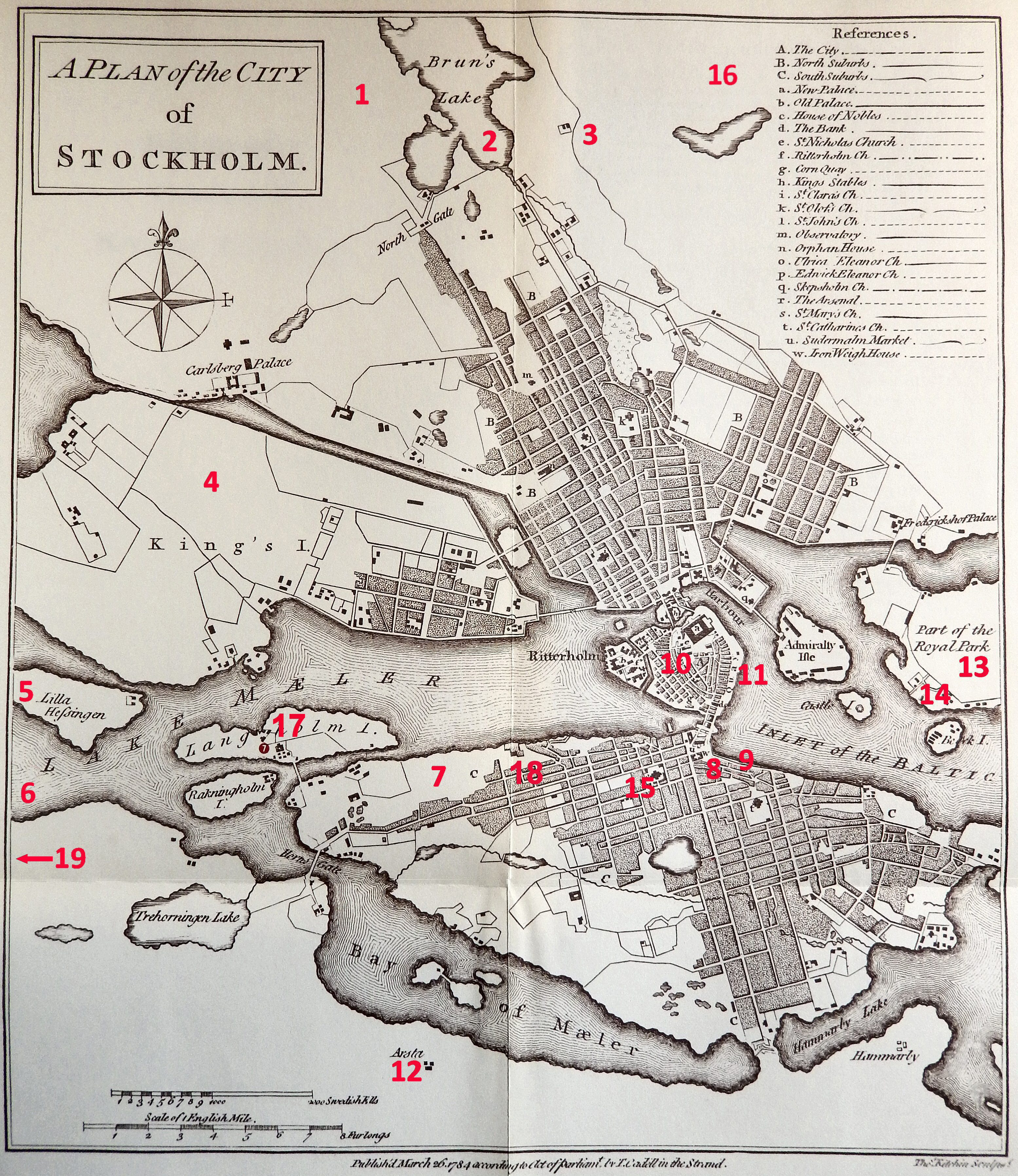
Map of Bellman's Stockholm, places of interest for his Fredman's Epistles and Songs on map from William Coxe's Travels into Poland, Russia, Sweden, and Denmark, 1784. 1 Haga park (S. 64) – 2 Brunnsviken – 3 Första Torpet (Ep. 80) – 4 Kungsholmen – 5 Hessingen (Ep. 48) – 6 Lake Mälaren (Ep. 48) – 7 Södermalm – 8 Urvädersgränd – 9 Lokatten tavern (Ep. 11, Ep. 59, Ep. 77), Bruna Dörren tavern (Ep. 24, Ep. 38) – 10 Gamla stan (Ep. 5, Ep. 9, Ep. 23, Ep. 28, Ep. 79) – 11 Skeppsbron Quay (Ep. 33) – 12 Årsta Castle – 13 Djurgården Park – (Ep. 25, Ep. 51, Ep. 82) – 14 Gröna Lund (Ep. 12, Ep. 62) – 15 Bellman's birthplace – 16 Fiskartorpet (Ep. 71) – 17 Lilla Sjötullen (Bellmanmuseet) (Ep. 48) – 18 Bensvarvars tavern (Ep. 40) 19 Rostock tavern (Ep. 45)

Bellman's biographers, the scholar of literature Lars Lönnroth and Carina Burman, both devote substantial sections of their respective accounts of Fredman's Epistles to No. 79.

Lönnroth writes that from the earliest epistles, the figure of Death was present amongst the Bacchanalian tumult of drinking brothers and attractive sisters. In epistle 79, he appears as Charon, the dour ferryman of the underworld who carries souls across the River Styx, never to return. The epistle's approach resembles that of one of the oldest, epistle 24 Kära syster! (Dear Sister), which also speaks of Charon and is similarly addressed to a tavern's landlady, who Fredman hopes will give him some brandy before he dies. The later epistle, however, goes much further in describing the storm that breaks out around Fredman's impending death, echoing Bellman's own storm narrative in Bacchi Tempel or the depiction of catastrophe in Bengt Lidner's best-known poem "Spastaras död" (Spastara's death). The account is both apocalyptic and everyday, familiar verbs like "tutar" ("hoots") undermining the high-sounding rhetoric. Meanwhile, the melody, which may well be one of the few that Bellman composed rather than adapted, contributes to the unnerving effect with dissonant chords and sudden intervals. The boundary between what Lönnroth calls "hallucinatory fantasy" and reality is quite unclear; in the second verse, Fredman tries to adjust his tavern credit note with the landlady, a seemingly earthy matter, but it might symbolise his book of sins, a serious concern that Bellman makes comic. Then Fredman, again in high spirits, sets up his will and renounces worldly things, before quickly turning to praise for the pub's beer. The fourth stanza is tragicomic, as in epistle 23, Ack du min moder (Alas though my mother), Fredman despairs over the condition in which he is going to face death. In the final stanza, the doomsday mood returns, and Fredman stands in Charon's ferry in a tremendous thunderstorm, before the stars go out and death's agony begins. In the last line, Fredman cheerfully wishes the landlady good night ("God natt Madame!") and goes to meet his fate. Lönnroth remarks that death may have triumphed, but Fredman is not wholly destroyed.

Burman comments in her biography that Fredman takes his fictional departure in the epistle. The real watchmaker Jean Fredman was in fact already dead (he died in 1767), but now in 1785 death has caught up with his fictional alter ego. Burman writes that just as Shakespeare lets the whole of nature react to Macbeth's regicide, so Bellman has the storms, the moon and the stars revolve around Fredman. Both men, she states, knew their bible, and there are echoes here of Matthew's "and the earth did quake, and the rocks rent". As so often, Bellman combines mythology and realism. Even with one foot in Charon's boat, Fredman drains his last mug of ale. New ale, or "wort" as Bellman calls it, is ascribed almost magical life-giving properties; it overflows and runs down Fredman's clothes, so that before death he is baptised in beer, recalling to Burman the sponge soaked in sour wine that the Roman soldiers offered to Jesus on the cross: "[Fredman] the apostle of brandy is sacrificed for us", and the epistle ends with nature in uproar. All the same, Burman writes, Fredman isn't quite finished. His epistles end with No. 80 Liksom en Herdinna (As a shepherdess), the bravura pastorale; No. 81 Märk hur vår skugga (Mark how our shadow) "dictated at the grave" where Charon can be seen waving, and finally No. 82 Hvila vid denna källa (Rest by this spring), which is stated to be a departure. Burman notes that where epistle No. 79's farewell is dark and apocalyptic, epistle 82's is its bright counterpart, with music, green grass, and Ulla Winblad's beauty around the dying Fredman.

The scholar of Swedish language Gun Widmark drew attention to a curious feature of the epistle, as also of epistles No. 3 (Fader Berg i hornet stöter) and No. 58 (Hjertat mig klämmer), namely that Charon keeps coming to find Fredman. She noted that the literary and theatre critic Åke Janzon had suggested in the 1960s that the reason for this was that Fredman had already crossed the Styx and had returned to haunt his favourite places; Charon had then come to take him back to the underworld where he belonged.

Epistle 79 has been recorded by Sven-Bertil Taube on his 1987 album Fredmans Epistlar och Sånger; and by the actor Mikael Samuelson on his 1988 album C. M. Bellman. It has been translated into English by Eva Toller in 2009 and by John Irons in 2020.

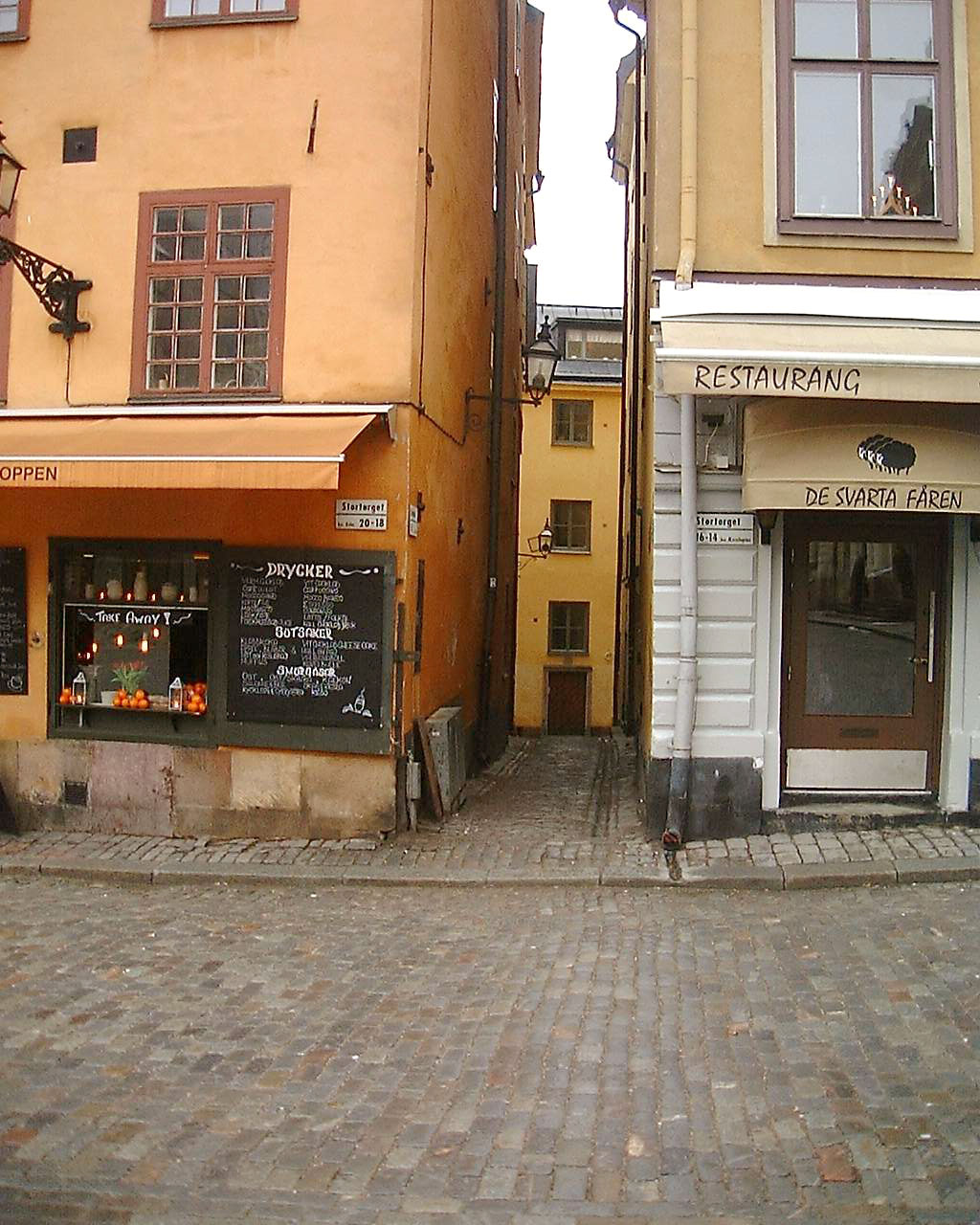
The epistle is set in the Förgyllda Bägaren tavern, one of three then in the narrow alleyway of Solgränd in Stockholm's Gamla stan.

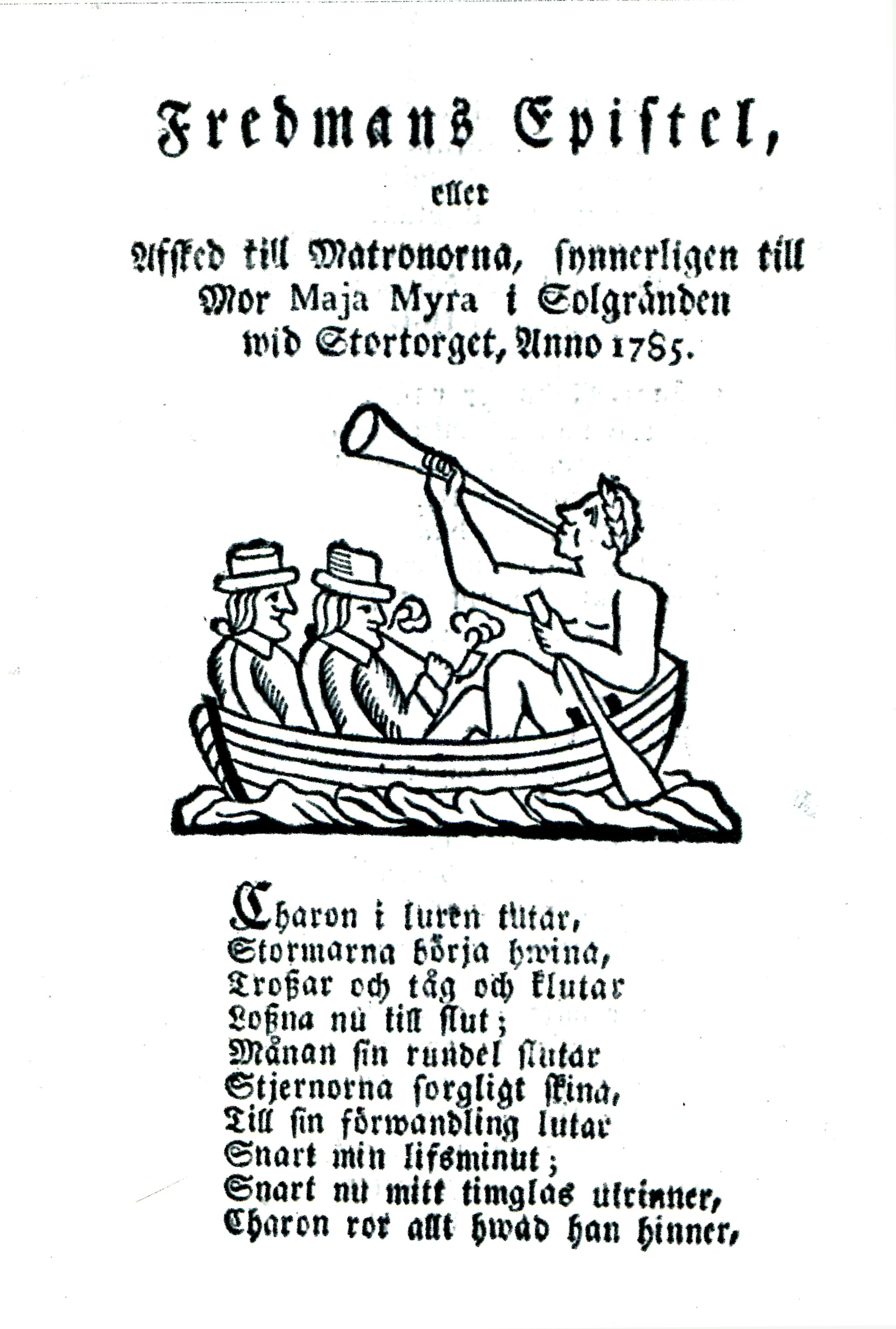
Shilling print of epistle 79, depicting Charon in his ferry blowing his horn. His boat is carrying two men in 18th century Swedish dress, one of them smoking a pipe.

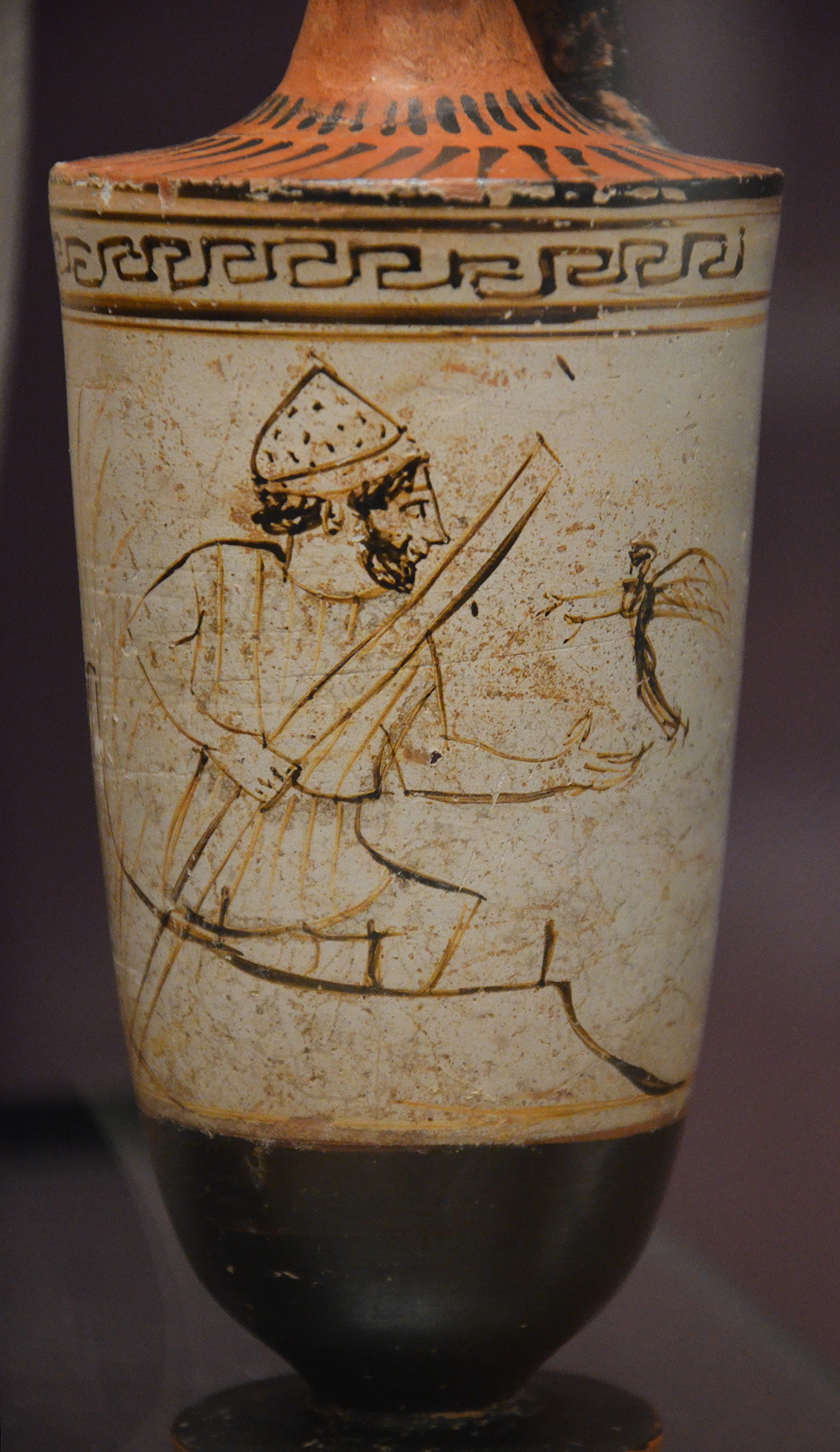
Charon welcomes a soul into his ferry to cross the River Styx into the underworld. Attic red-figure lekythos, c. 500–450 BC

== Sources ==
- Bellman, Carl Michael (1790). Fredmans epistlar. Stockholm: By Royal Privilege.
- Britten Austin, Paul (1967). The Life and Songs of Carl Michael Bellman: Genius of the Swedish Rococo. New York: Allhem, Malmö The American-Scandinavian Foundation. ISBN 978-3-932759-00-0.
- Burman, Carina (2019). Bellman. Biografin [Bellman: The Biography] (in Swedish). Stockholm: Albert Bonniers Förlag. ISBN 978-9100141790.
- Hassler, Göran; Dahl, Peter (illus.) (1989). Bellman – en antologi [Bellman – an anthology]. En bok för alla. ISBN 91-7448-742-6. (contains the most popular Epistles and Songs, in Swedish, with sheet music)
- Kleveland, Åse; Ehrén, Svenolov (illus.) (1984). Fredmans epistlar & sånger [The songs and epistles of Fredman]. Stockholm: Informationsförlaget. ISBN 91-7736-059-1. (with facsimiles of sheet music from first editions in 1790, 1791)
- Lönnroth, Lars (2005). Ljuva karneval! : om Carl Michael Bellmans diktning [Lovely Carnival! : about Carl Michael Bellman's Verse]. Stockholm: Albert Bonniers Förlag. ISBN 978-91-0-057245-7. OCLC 61881374.
- Massengale, James Rhea (1979). The Musical-Poetic Method of Carl Michael Bellman. Stockholm: Almqvist & Wiksell International. ISBN 91-554-0849-4.
