= Movitz blåste en konsert =

Song by the 18th century Swedish bard Carl Michael Bellman

- Art song
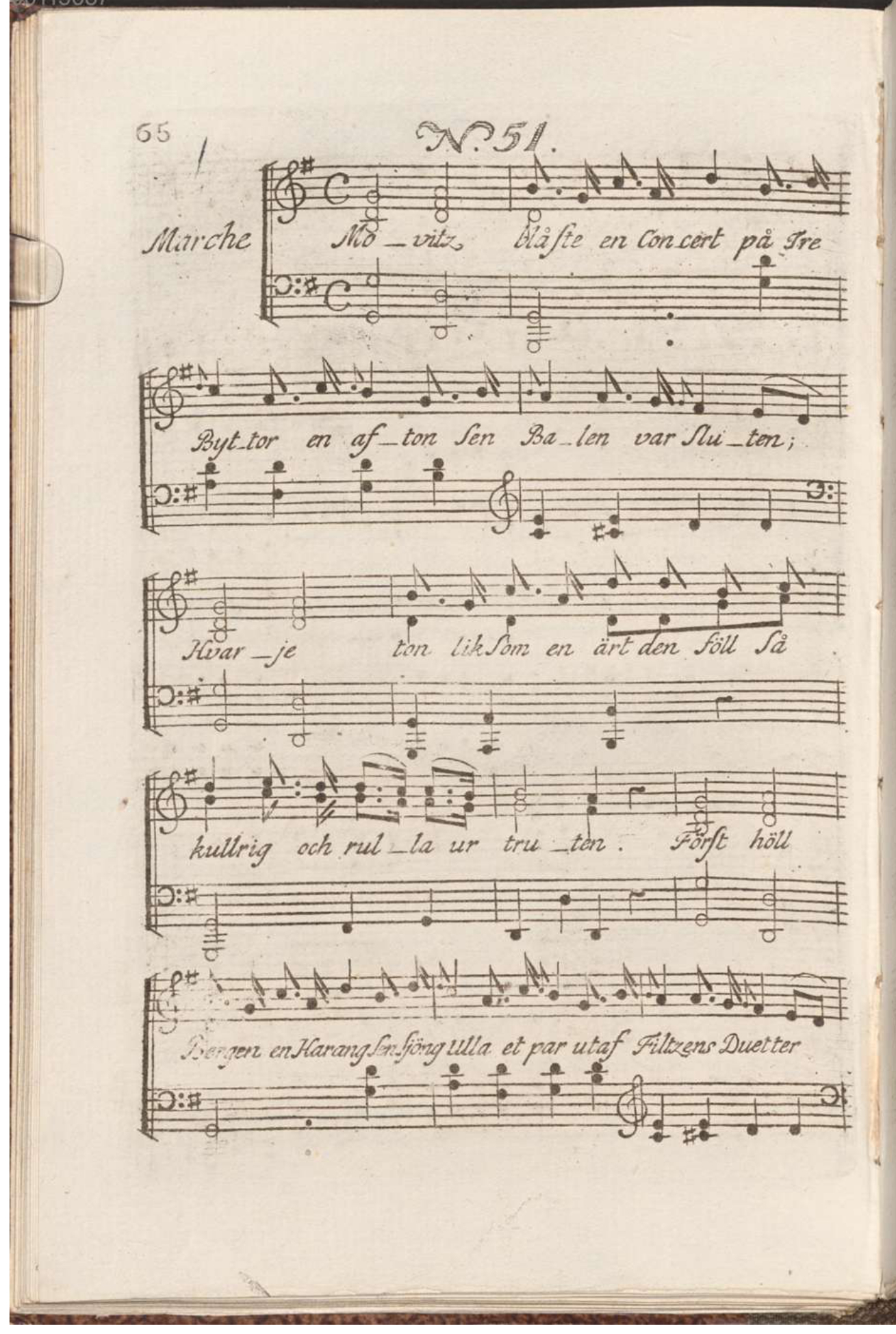
- First page of sheet music
- English: Movitz blew a concert
- Written: 1773
- Text: poem by Carl Michael Bellman
- Language: Swedish
- Published: 1790 in Fredman's Epistles
- Scoring: voice and cittern

Movitz blåste en konsert (Movitz blew a concert) is epistle No. 51 in the Swedish poet and performer Carl Michael Bellman's 1790 song collection, Fredman's Epistles. The epistle is subtitled "Angående konserten på Tre Byttor" ("Concerning the concert at the Three Barrels"), naming a restaurant in Stockholm's Djurgården park. It was written after Bellman had become a court musician to the new King Gustav III in 1773. The melody was borrowed from George Frideric Handel's 1718 opera, Acis and Galatea.

The song describes a concert in an elegant setting, the performance taking place after an evening ball in a restaurant. It strikes a refined tone, mentioning the opera composer Baldassare Galuppi and the cellist and composer Anton Fils. This does not prevent Bellman from making the song humorous, with opportunities for the performer to imitate musical instruments, for elegance to be contrasted with tavern life, and for the real world to be contrasted with classical mythology with mentions of Eol and Neptune. The epistle has at least twice been translated into English verse.

== Context ==
Carl Michael Bellman is a central figure in the Swedish ballad tradition and a powerful influence in Swedish music, known for his 1790 Fredman's Epistles and his 1791 Fredman's Songs. A solo entertainer, he played the cittern, accompanying himself as he performed his songs at the royal court.

Jean Fredman (1712 or 1713–1767) was a real watchmaker of Bellman's Stockholm. The fictional Fredman, alive after 1767, but without employment, is the supposed narrator in Bellman's epistles and songs. The epistles, written and performed in different styles, from drinking songs and laments to pastorales, paint a complex picture of the life of the city during the 18th century. A frequent theme is the demimonde, with Fredman's cheerfully drunk Order of Bacchus, a loose company of ragged men who favour strong drink and prostitutes. At the same time as depicting this realist side of life, Bellman creates a rococo picture, full of classical allusion, following the French post-Baroque poets. The women, including the beautiful Ulla Winblad, are "nymphs", while Neptune's festive troop of followers and sea-creatures sport in Stockholm's waters. The juxtaposition of elegant and low life is humorous, sometimes burlesque, but always graceful and sympathetic. The songs are "most ingeniously" set to their music, which is nearly always borrowed and skilfully adapted.

== Song ==
The epistle is subtitled "Angående konserten på Tre Byttor" ("Concerning the concert at the Three Barrels"), naming a restaurant in Stockholm's Djurgården park. The song describes a concert in an elegant setting, more formal than the earlier epistles, with the performance taking place after an evening ball in a restaurant.

=== Music ===
Melody of Epistle 51
Melody from Handel's Acis and Galatea

The song is in 4/4 time. It has 6 verses, each consisting of 12 lines. The rhyming pattern is ABAB-CDCD-EEFE; the song was written in 1773, sometime from June onwards.

Like epistle No. 12, the melody was borrowed from George Frideric Handel's 1718 opera Acis and Galatea, in this case from the "Cyclops' Dance" or "Contradanse belle constante".

=== Lyrics ===
First stanza in verse translations
Swedish

Movitz blåste en Concert
På Tre Byttor en afton sen balen var sluten;
Hvarje ton liksom en ärt
Den föll så kullrig och rulla ur truten.
Först höll Bergen en harang,
Sen sjöng Ulla et par utaf Filtzens (Note: Anton Fils, also called Johann Anton Filtz, was a German cello virtuoso and composer.) Duetter
Vid et accompagnement
Utaf två Flöjter och sex Clarinetter.
Hör båd' folk och fä - - - Clarin.
Orphei (Note: Bellman here likens Movitz's oboe to the legendary lyre-playing of Orpheus, who could supposedly charm all living things with his music.) Oboe. - - - Clarin.
Lät oss vara glada, barn,
Och klappa systrarna hvar på sitt knä.

Hendrik Willem van Loon's verse, 1939

Movitz, coming from a ball,
To an inn repaired, forthwith declared a concert on his horn he'd give.
Each tone from his lips did fall,
Round as a pea, pure and sure and sensitive.
Berg spoke first with great élan,
Then Ulla did her bit and sang with gusto to some of Filtz's duetts,
To the strange accomp'niment of only two flutes
but yes, six clarinettes.
Man and beast take heed!
Orpheus's oboe!
gaiety is what you need,
So get your girl and all sadness forego.

Paul Britten Austin's verse, 1977

Movitz blew so merrily
Late one ev'ning in the tavern, when the dancing was over,
Ev'ry note, as 'twere a pea,
It roll'd so round from his gob into his oboe.
Bergen held a little speech,
Then our Ulla sang a couple of old Filtz's duetti
To an obbligato screech
Of two flutes, sir, and six clarinetti.
Hear good company - - - Clarin.
Orpheus' oboë! - - - Clarin.
Children, let us cheerful be
And give each sister a pat on her knee.

== Reception and legacy ==
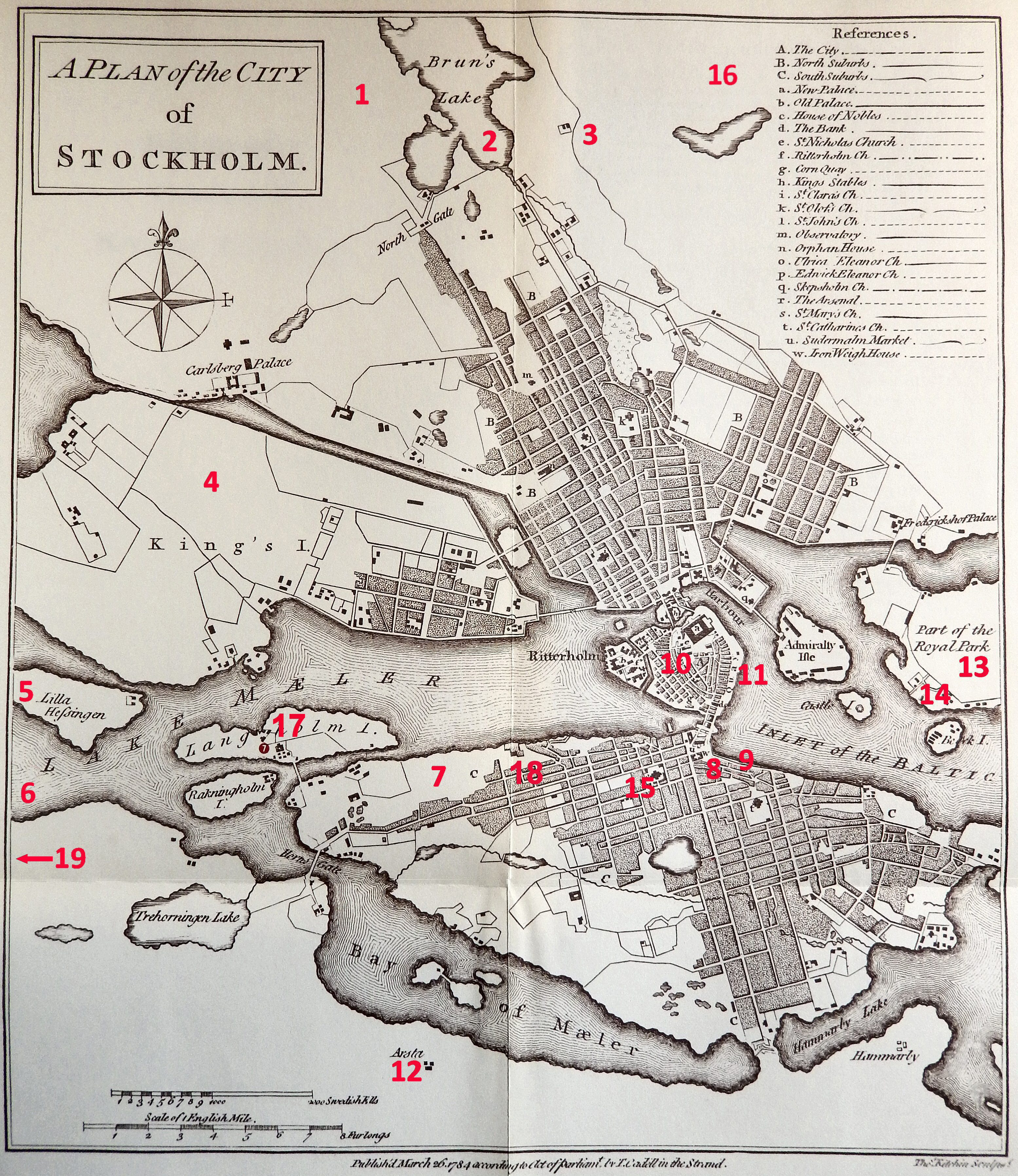
Map of Bellman's Stockholm, places of interest for his Fredman's Epistles and Songs on map from William Coxe's Travels into Poland, Russia, Sweden, and Denmark, 1784. 1 Haga park (S. 64) – 2 Brunnsviken – 3 Första Torpet (Ep. 80) – 4 Kungsholmen – 5 Hessingen (Ep. 48) – 6 Lake Mälaren (Ep. 48) – 7 Södermalm – 8 Urvädersgränd – 9 Lokatten tavern (Ep. 11, Ep. 59, Ep. 77), Bruna Dörren tavern (Ep. 24, Ep. 38) – 10 Gamla stan (Ep. 5, Ep. 9, Ep. 23, Ep. 28, Ep. 79) – 11 Skeppsbron Quay (Ep. 33) – 12 Årsta Castle – 13 Djurgården Park – (Ep. 25, Ep. 51, Ep. 82) – 14 Gröna Lund (Ep. 12, Ep. 62) – 15 Bellman's birthplace – 16 Fiskartorpet (Ep. 71) – 17 Lilla Sjötullen (Bellmanmuseet) (Ep. 48) – 18 Bensvarvars tavern (Ep. 40) 19 Rostock tavern (Ep. 45)

The scholar of literature Lars Lönnroth writes that Fredman and his Bacchanalian congregation adapted to Bellman's new role as a royal poet. Epistle 51 reflects the musical soirée of May 1773 held by the theatre manager Carl Stenborg with leading artists and members of Stockholm's Music Academy to celebrate the coronation of King Gustav III. The places of the distinguished musicians are taken by Movitz, Mollberg, and Ulla Winblad, but they have left the noise of the tavern to appear as professional musicians in one of Stockholm's more elegant restaurants. The song ends with "Vivat vår monark!" ("Long live our Monarch!"), something that sounds more appropriate to a salon than a typical Fredman tavern. However, Lönnroth writes, that may not be correct, as the song still contains burlesque elements: how can Ulla be duetting with herself in the first verse? – and "fighting like Poles" (verse 2) does not sound very sophisticated either. He notes that Gunnar Hillbom suggests that the Three Barrels concert could be taken as a parody of royalist and bourgeois cultural life. Still, a more refined tone is present, with talk of arpeggios and a musical "air" by the Italian opera composer Baldassare Galuppi (verse 3). Bellman switches, too, between the salon and the outside world, and between the real and the mythological. The last verse begins "Eol storms across the sky, Night's lamps are put out; it rains and squalls, and Neptune from the water's surface casts ashore whales and his guests." After this, the singing and the music of bassoon and clarinettes resumes, a haven from the terrors outside.

Carina Burman comments in her biography that an elderly Bellman in the autumn of 1794 could still entertain his hosts with performances of the riotous wedding-epistle 40 (Ge rum i Bröllopsgåln din hund!) and epistle 51, where he pretended to accompany himself with all the wind instruments mentioned, so that the audience felt they were hearing French horn, clarinettes, flutes, and oboe. Everyone laughed more than they thought possible.

The scholar of Swedish literature Staffan Björck calls the song a "bewitching music-epistle", and writes that Fredman's description constantly hovers between past and present. At the start of the first verse, Movitz "blew"; but at the end of the verse he addresses the audience in the present tense, "Let us be glad"; and the same pattern repeats in each subsequent verse, as "the now pushes itself forward and breaks through".

Epistle 51 has been recorded by Fred Åkerström on his 1969 album Fred sjunger Bellman; by Sven-Bertil Taube on his 1987 album Fredmans Epistlar och Sånger; and by Peter Ekberg Pelz on his 1985 album C. M. Bellman. It has been translated into English verse by Hendrik Willem van Loon in 1939 and by Paul Britten Austin in 1977. The painter Wilhelm Wallander, planning to create an illustrated book of Fredman's Epistles, created a genre painting of The Concert at Tre Byttor, though he never completed the book.

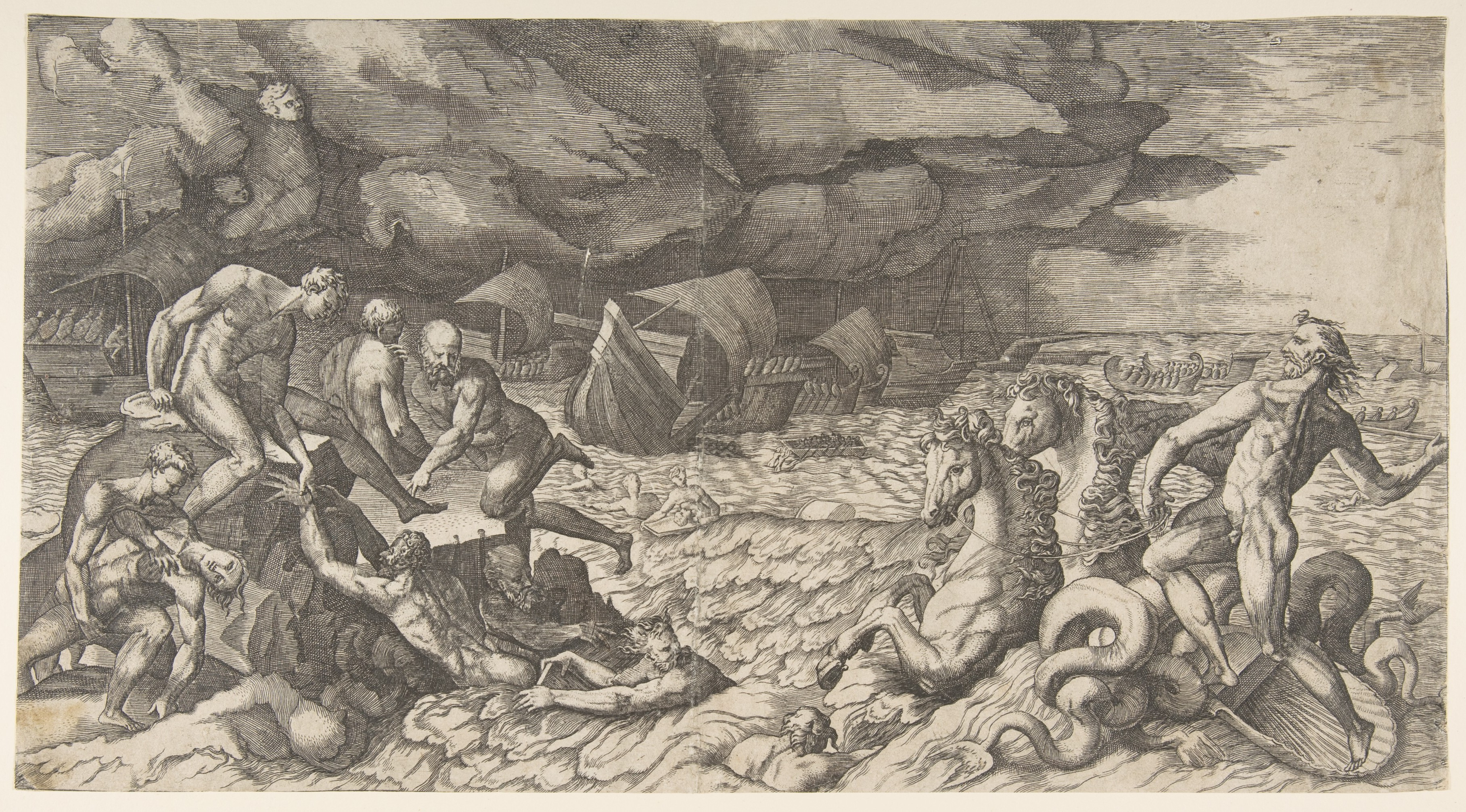
Mythological imagery: Neptune calming the tempest raised by Aeolus. Engraving by Giulio Bonasone, 1531–1576

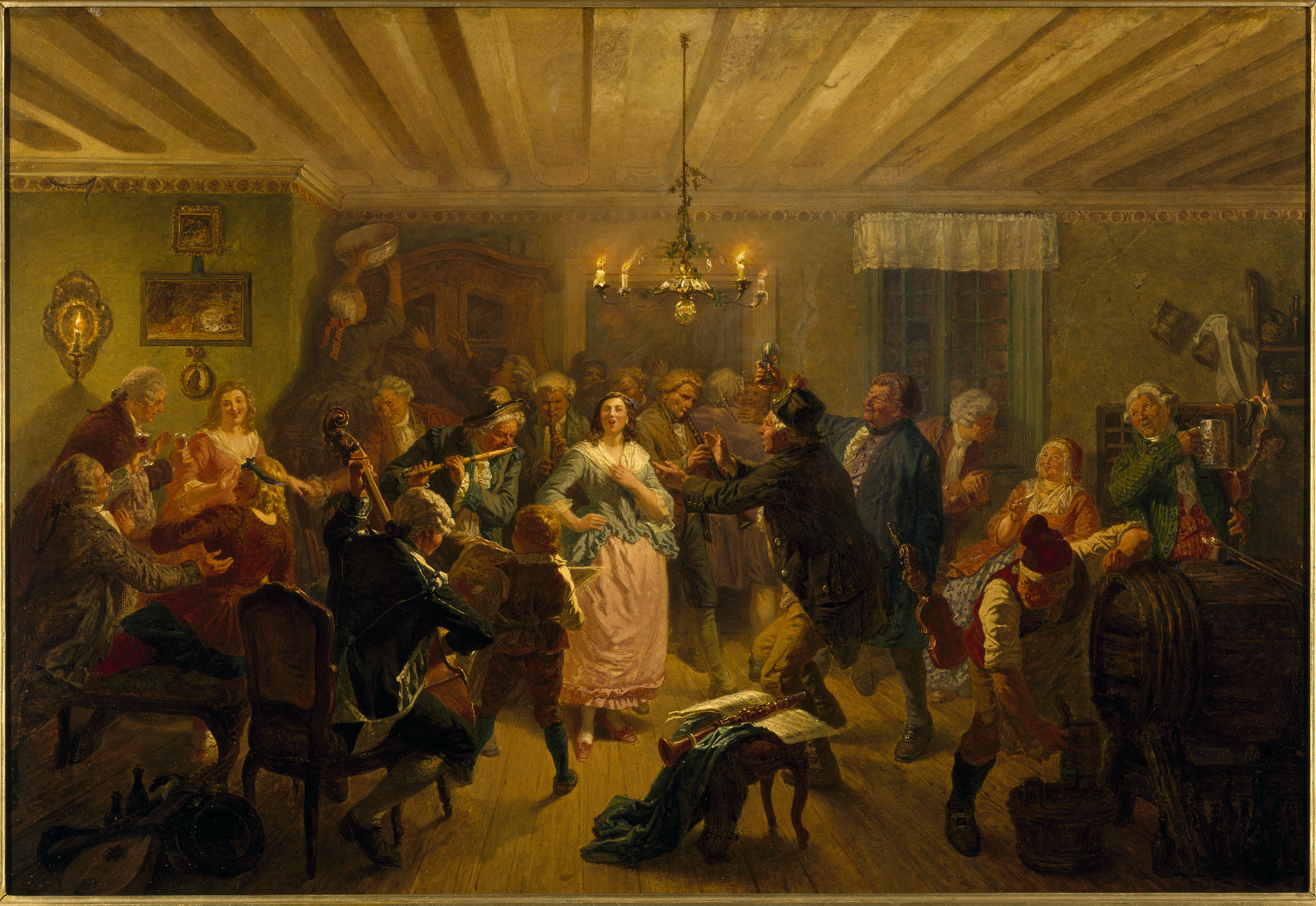
The Concert at Tre Byttor by Wilhelm Wallander, 1860. Movitz (centre right) has laid down his oboe; Ulla Winblad (centre) is singing, and Christian Wingmark is playing the flute (centre left). Clarinettes are being played in the background; stringed instruments can be seen on both sides.

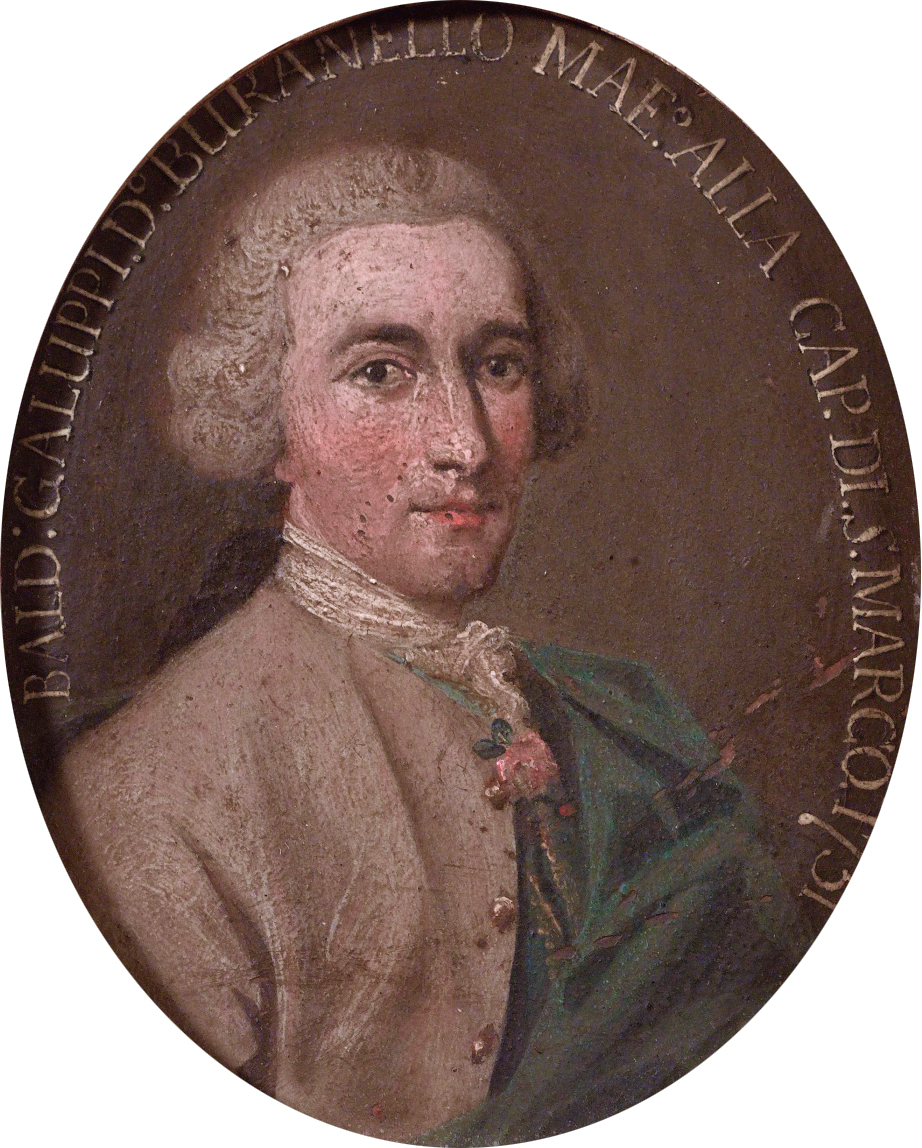
The Italian opera composer Baldassare Galuppi is named in the song, providing an air of sophistication.

== Sources ==
- Bellman, Carl Michael (1790). Fredmans epistlar. Stockholm: By Royal Privilege.
- Bellman, Carl Michael; Hillbom, Gunnar (1994). Fredmans epistlar: med ordförklaringar och melodikällor [Fredman's Epistles: with notes and music sources] (in Swedish). Stockholm: Proprius. ISBN 91-7118-814-2.
- Britten Austin, Paul (1967). The Life and Songs of Carl Michael Bellman: Genius of the Swedish Rococo. New York: Allhem, Malmö American-Scandinavian Foundation. ISBN 978-3-932759-00-0.
- Britten Austin, Paul (1977). Fredman's Epistles and Songs. Stockholm: Reuter and Reuter. OCLC 5059758.
- Björck, Staffan (1995). "Fredman som conférencier". Vänskapens pris: Litteraturvetenskapliga studier [The Price of Friendship: Studies in Literature] (PDF). Absalon (in Swedish). Vol. 7. Lund University. ISBN 91-88396-07-X.
- Burman, Carina (2019). Bellman. Biografin [Bellman: The Biography] (in Swedish). Stockholm: Albert Bonniers Förlag. ISBN 978-9100141790.
- Hassler, Göran; Dahl, Peter (illus.) (1989). Bellman – en antologi [Bellman – an anthology]. En bok för alla. ISBN 91-7448-742-6. (contains the most popular Epistles and Songs, in Swedish, with sheet music)
- Kleveland, Åse; Ehrén, Svenolov (illus.) (1984). Fredmans epistlar & sånger [The songs and epistles of Fredman]. Stockholm: Informationsförlaget. ISBN 91-7736-059-1. (with facsimiles of sheet music from first editions in 1790, 1791)
- Lönnroth, Lars (2005). Ljuva karneval! : om Carl Michael Bellmans diktning [Lovely Carnival! : about Carl Michael Bellman's Verse]. Stockholm: Albert Bonniers Förlag. ISBN 978-91-0-057245-7. OCLC 61881374.
- Massengale, James Rhea (1979). The Musical-Poetic Method of Carl Michael Bellman. Stockholm: Almqvist & Wiksell International. ISBN 91-554-0849-4.
- Van Loon, Hendrik Willem; Castagnetta, Grace (1939). The Last of the Troubadours. New York: Simon & Schuster.
