= Gustaf Birch-Lindgren =

Swedish architect

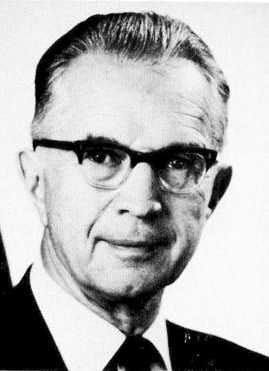
- Born: 1 October 1892; Stockholm, Sweden
- Died: 6 September 1969 (aged 76); Stockholm, Sweden
- Occupation: Architect

Gustaf Birch-Lindgren (1 October 1892 – 6 September 1969) was a Swedish architect. His work was part of the architecture event in the art competition at the 1932 Summer Olympics.
