= Fiskartorpet =

Coordinates: 59°21′32″N 18°04′35″E

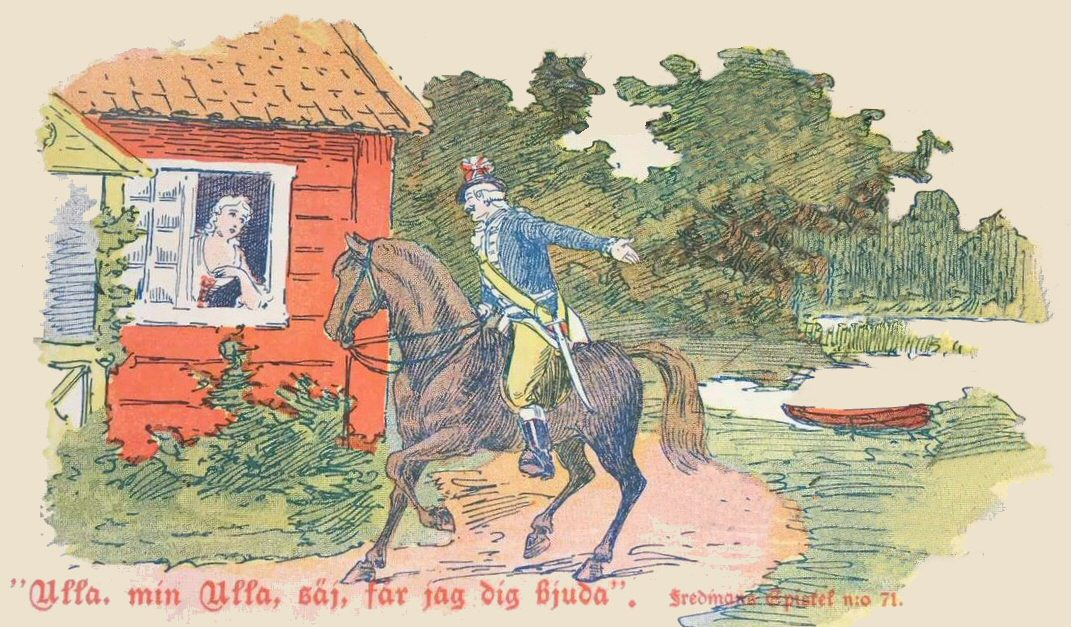
A serenade at Fiskartorpet: Coloured postcard of Carl Michael Bellman's song "Ulla! min Ulla!", with Fredman on his horse, and Ulla at the window of the fishing cottage, 1903

Fiskartorpet is a recreational area north of Stockholm, Sweden. It is situated in the Djurgården area. It features a small hotel, a small conference center, and a number of restaurants. Sporting facilities include an ice hockey rink, a soccer field, and a K-47 ski jump.

== History ==
King Charles XI of Sweden had a fishing cottage at Fiskartorpet during the 17th century, and the cottage still stands at its original location. The first ski jump at the site was built in the 1890s. In 1904, an even larger hill with towers was inaugurated after drawings by architect Gustaf Wickman (1858-1916). The first wooden structure of the tower was replaced in the 1930s. It had been designed by Gustaf Birch-Lindgren (1892-1969).

It is one of the locations for Fredman's Epistles, a collection of songs by Sweden's bard, Carl Michael Bellman. It is the setting for one of Carl Michael Bellman's most famous songs, Fredman's Epistle No. 71, Ulla, min Ulla, säj, får jag dig bjuda, which is subtitled "Till Ulla i fönstret på Fiskartorpet middagstiden en sommardag. Pastoral dedicerad till Herr Assessor Lundström" (To Ulla in the window in Fiskartorpet at lunchtime one summer's day. Pastoral dedicated to Mr Assessor Lundström).

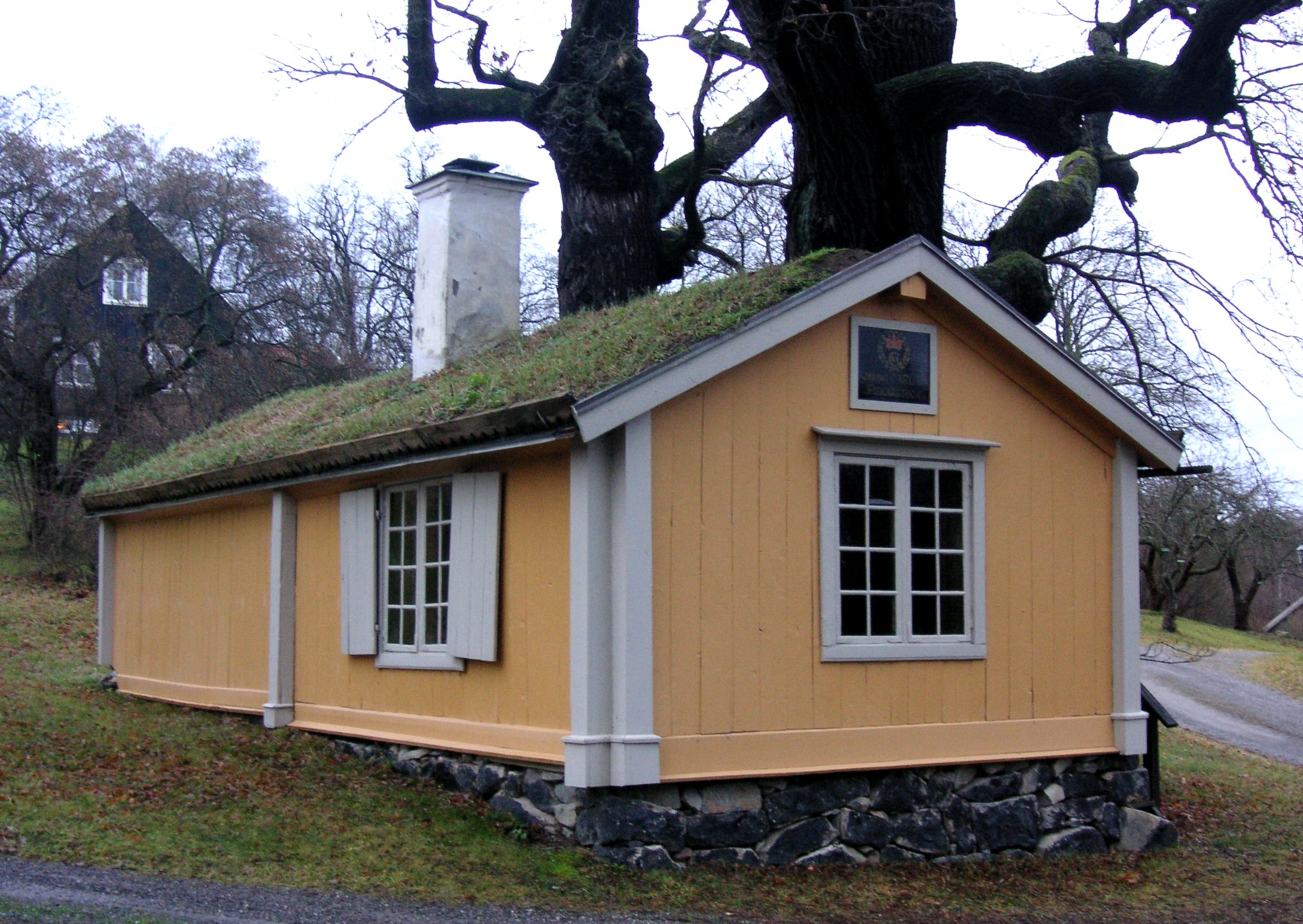
King Charles XI's former fishing cottage, which gave its name to the area

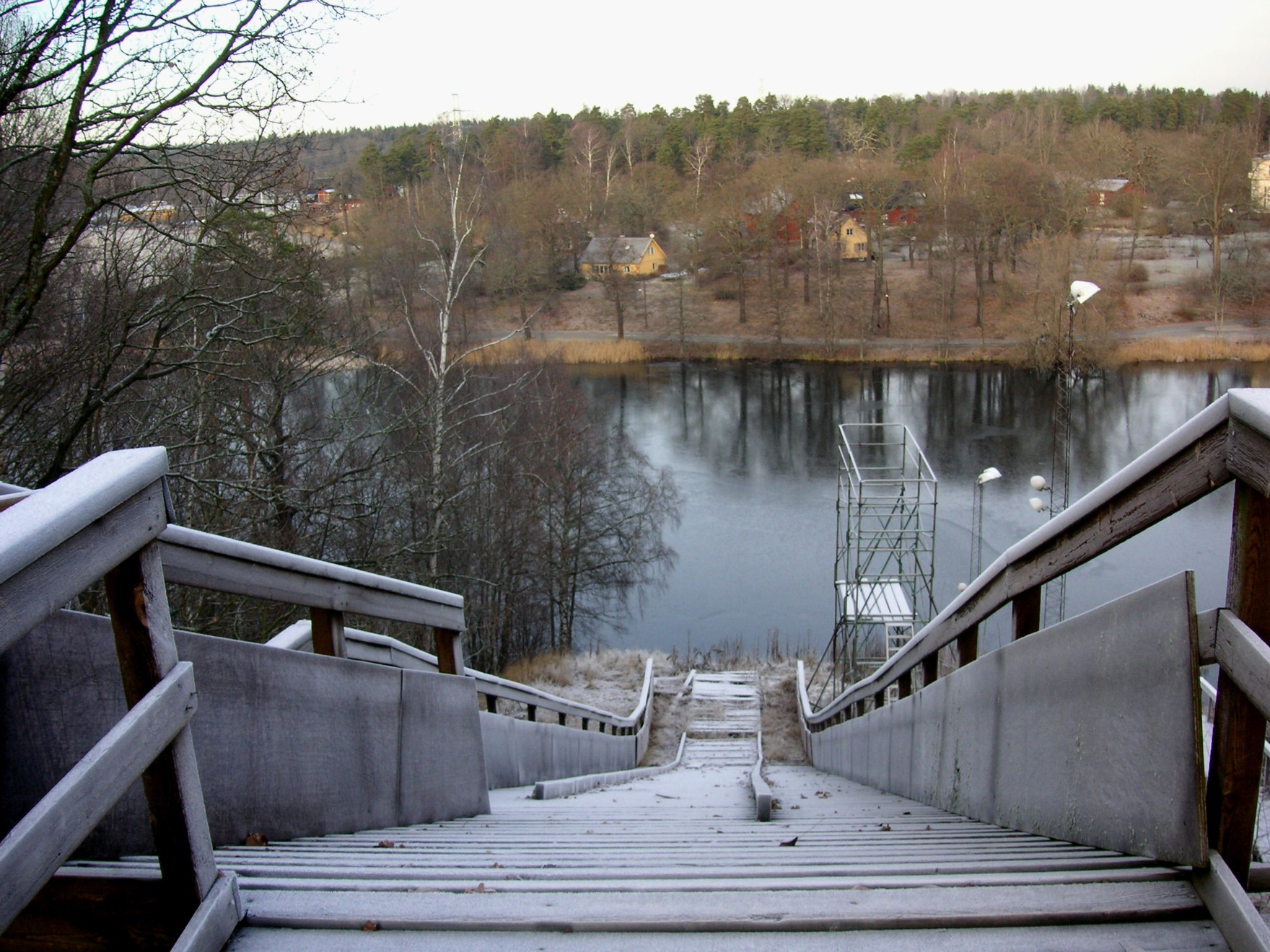
A nearby ski jump
