= Årsta Castle =

Coordinates: 59°06′27″N 18°11′38″E

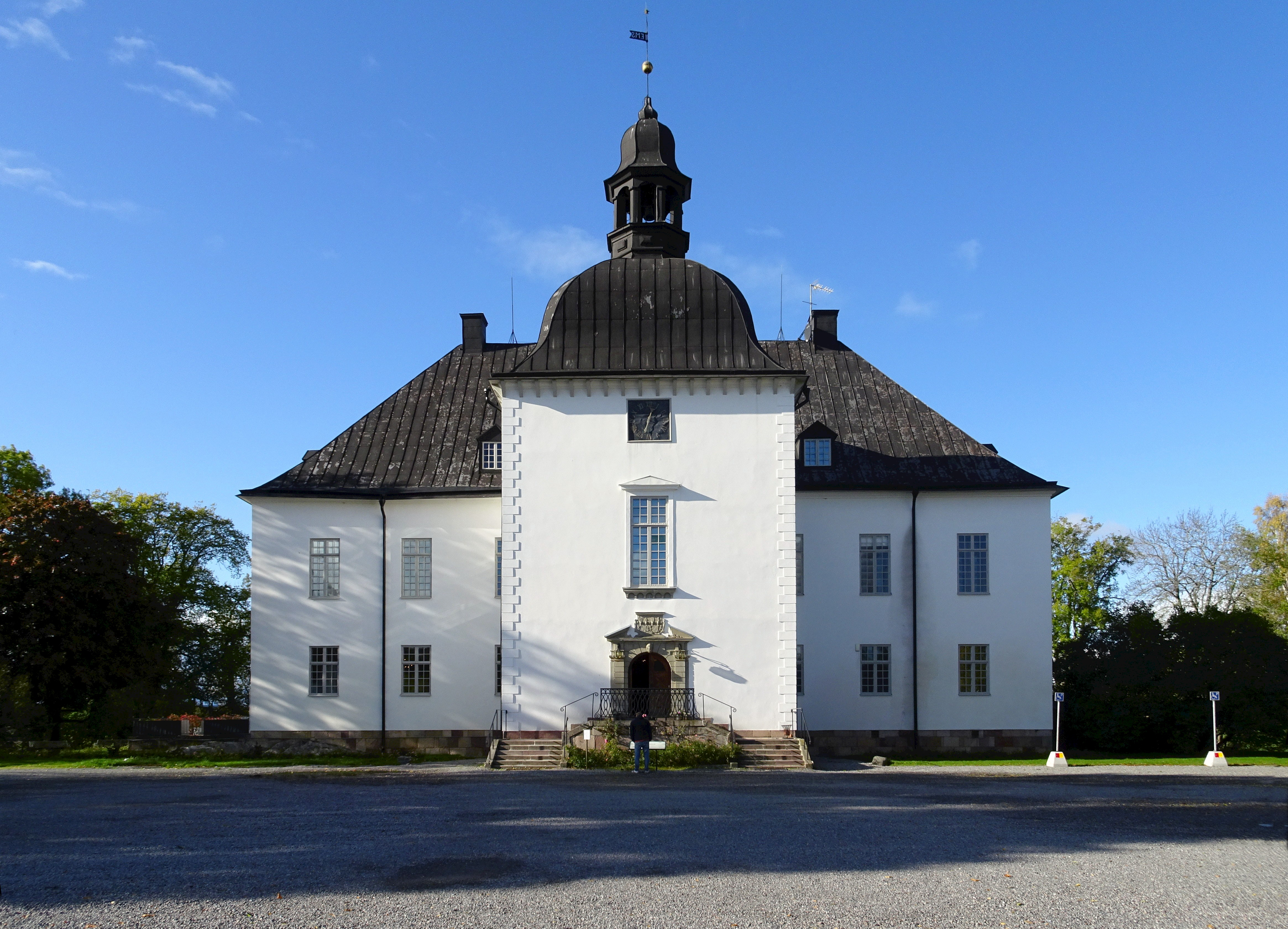
Årsta Castle

Årsta Castle (Swedish: Årsta slott) in Haninge Municipality, Stockholm County, Sweden, is a castle built in the 17th century.

The Årsta estate is mentioned in 1308, when it was the base for the Swedish property of the Teutonic Order. It was sold to the nobleman Erik Axelsson Tott in 1467. There are still remains of the medieval ruins at the land close to Årsta Castle. The present Årsta Castle was constructed between 1660 and 1667 by Claes Hansson Bielkenstierna and his spouse Barbro Åkesdotter Natt och Dag. It was inherited through marriage by the noble families Kurck, Soop and Fleming until it was bought in 1805 by Carl Fredrik Bremer, the father of Fredrika Bremer. She died on the estate in 1865.

In 1898–1910, it was owned by a stock holding company, and in 1910-1919 by telephone engineer Gustaf Cedergren, who modernized it internally.

Årsta Castle was acquired by Österhaninge Municipality in 1966 and is today used by the restaurant Årsta Slott Gastronomi and the society Årstasällskapet.
