= Käre bröder, så låtom oss supa i frid =

Song by the 18th century Swedish bard Carl Michael Bellman

- Art song
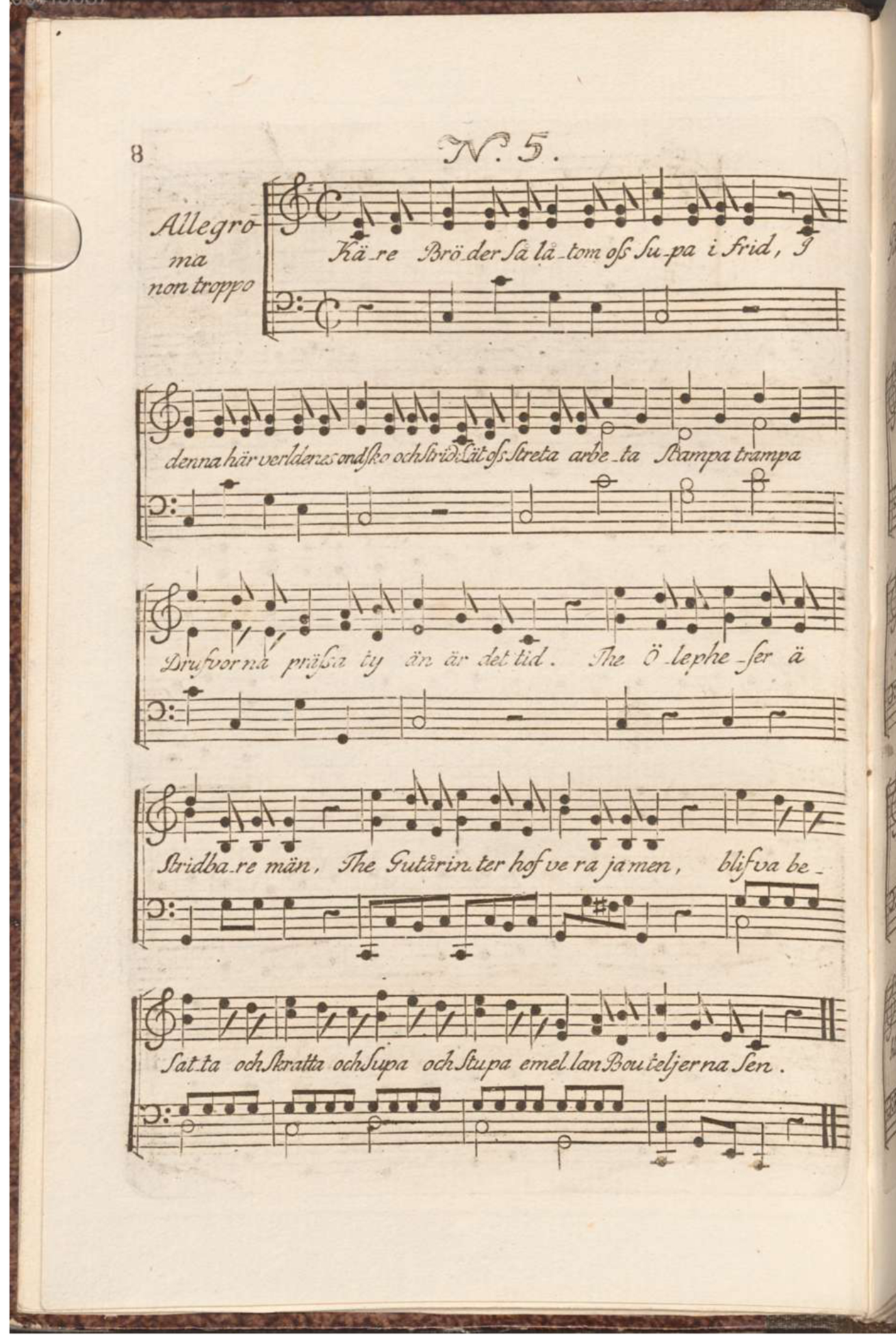
- First page of sheet music, 1810 reprint
- English: Dear brethren, so let us drink in peace
- Written: 1770
- Text: poem by Carl Michael Bellman
- Language: Swedish
- Published: 1790 in Fredman's Epistles
- Scoring: voice, cittern

Käre bröder, så låtom oss supa i frid (Dear brethren, so let us drink in peace) is Epistle No. 5 in the Swedish poet and performer Carl Michael Bellman's 1790 song collection, Fredman's Epistles. The epistle is subtitled "Til the trogne Bröder på Terra Nova i Gaffelgränden." ("To the faithful Brethren in Terra Nova in Gaffelgränden"). The first epistle to be written, it introduces Jean Fredman's fictional world of ragged drunken men in Stockholm's taverns, making music, drinking, and preaching the message of the apostles of brandy, in the style of St Paul's epistles. The composition's approach is simple compared to later epistles, retaining much of the character of a drinking song.

Scholars note that Bellman had the idea of parodying a sermon for the burial of the real Fredman in 1767, but transformed this into having Fredman as a prophet who sent Bacchanalian epistles to the faithful. This enabled Bellman to write a succession of epistles, 25 of them in 1770.

== Background ==
Carl Michael Bellman is a central figure in the Swedish ballad tradition and a powerful influence in Swedish music, known for his 1790 Fredman's Epistles and his 1791 Fredman's Songs. A solo entertainer, he played the cittern, accompanying himself as he performed his songs at the royal court.

Jean Fredman (1712 or 1713–1767) was a real watchmaker of Bellman's Stockholm. The fictional Fredman, alive after 1767, but without employment, is the supposed narrator in Bellman's epistles and songs. The epistles, written and performed in different styles, from drinking songs and laments to pastorales, paint a complex picture of the life of the city during the 18th century. A frequent theme is the demimonde, with Fredman's cheerfully drunk Order of Bacchus, a loose company of ragged men who favour strong drink and prostitutes. At the same time as depicting this realist side of life, Bellman creates a rococo picture, full of classical allusion, following the French post-Baroque poets. The women, including the beautiful Ulla Winblad, are "nymphs", while Neptune's festive troop of followers and sea-creatures sport in Stockholm's waters. The juxtaposition of elegant and low life is humorous, sometimes burlesque, but always graceful and sympathetic. The songs are "most ingeniously" set to their music, which is nearly always borrowed and skilfully adapted.

== Song ==
=== Music and verse form ===
Melody of Epistle 5
Tune based on a songplay by Henrik Brandel

The song was composed in the spring of 1770; it was the first of the epistles to be written. The composition has the timbre "Alt sedan Bernhardus kom til vår by" from a songplay by Henrik Brandel, which the musicologist James Massengale assumes was Bellman's immediate source; the melody had been used in numerous other places. There are three stanzas, each of 14 lines. The rhyming scheme is AA-BBCC-ADD-EEFFD. The Epistle's time signature is 4/4, with its tempo marked Allegro ma non troppo.

=== Lyrics ===
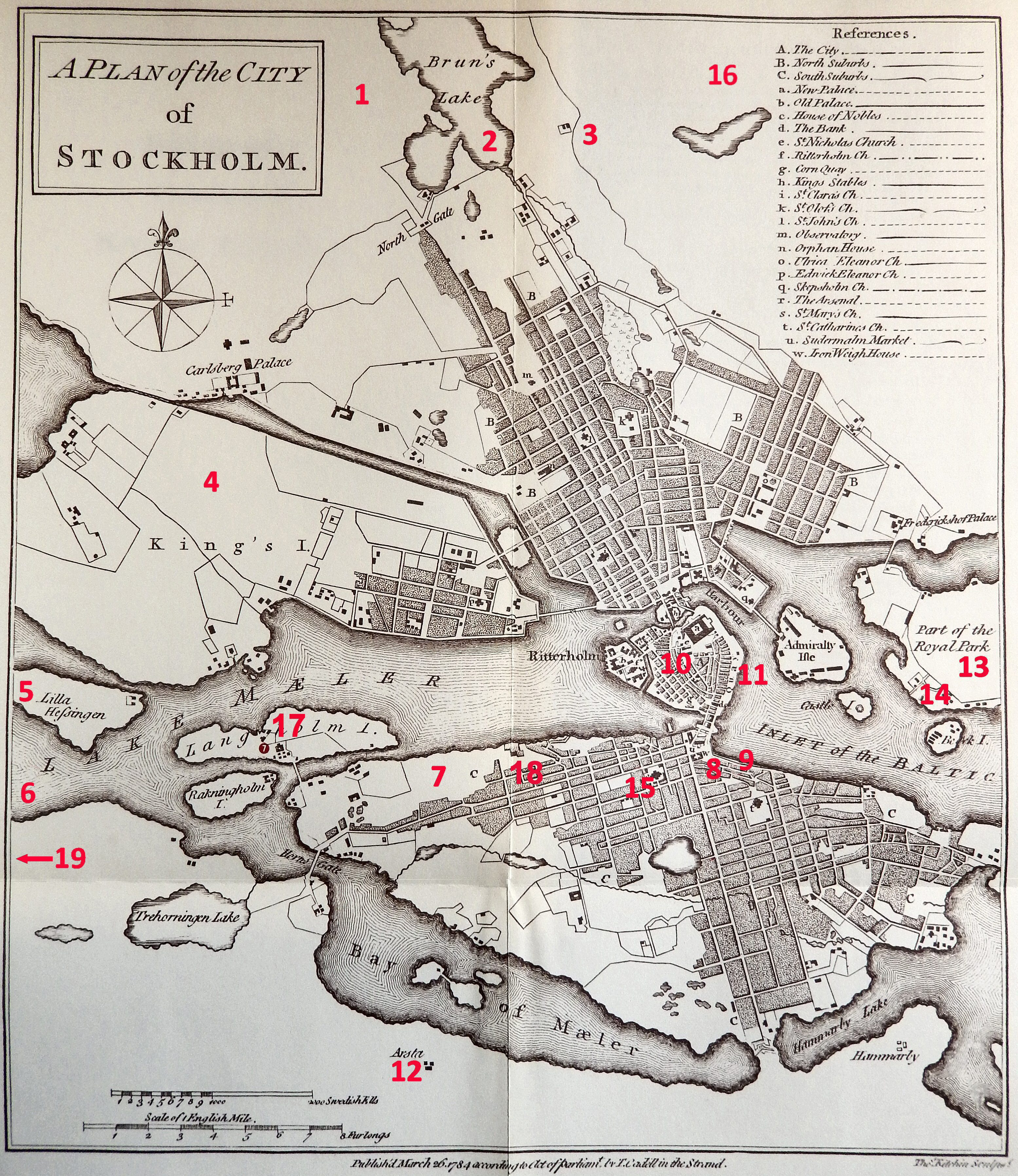
Map of Bellman's Stockholm, places of interest for his Fredman's Epistles and Songs on map from William Coxe's Travels into Poland, Russia, Sweden, and Denmark, 1784. 1 Haga park (S. 64) – 2 Brunnsviken – 3 Första Torpet (Ep. 80) – 4 Kungsholmen – 5 Hessingen (Ep. 48) – 6 Lake Mälaren (Ep. 48) – 7 Södermalm – 8 Urvädersgränd – 9 Lokatten tavern (Ep. 11, Ep. 59, Ep. 77), Bruna Dörren tavern (Ep. 24, Ep. 38) – 10 Gamla stan (Ep. 5, Ep. 9, Ep. 23, Ep. 28, Ep. 79) – 11 Skeppsbron Quay (Ep. 33) – 12 Årsta Castle – 13 Djurgården Park – (Ep. 25, Ep. 51, Ep. 82) – 14 Gröna Lund (Ep. 12, Ep. 62) – 15 Bellman's birthplace – 16 Fiskartorpet (Ep. 71) – 17 Lilla Sjötullen (Bellmanmuseet) (Ep. 48) – 18 Bensvarvars tavern (Ep. 40) 19 Rostock tavern (Ep. 45)

The subtitle text is "Til the trogne Bröder på Terra Nova i Gaffelgränden." ("To the faithful Brethren in Terra Nova in Gaffelgränden."), echoing the biblical language of St Paul's Epistles. The locale was a tavern in an alleyway of Stockholm's Gamla stan.

The first stanza of Epistle 5
Carl Michael Bellman, 1790

Käre bröder, så låtom oss supa i frid,
I denna här verldenes ondsko och strid:
Låt oss streta,
Arbeta,
Stampa,
Trampa,
Drufvorna prässa, ty än är det tid.
The Ölepheser ä stridbare män,
The Gutårinter hofvera, ja men,
Blifva besatta,
Och skratta
Och supa
Och stupa
Emellan Buteljerna sen.

prose translation

Dearly beloved brethren, let us drink in peace,
In the evil and strife of this troubled world:
Let us struggle,
Work,
Stamp,
Tread,
Press the grapes, as it is the season.
The Ale-ephesians are combative men,
The Cheer-inthians strut about, yes but,
Be obsessed,
And laugh
And drink
And fall over
Between the Bottles then.

== Reception and legacy ==
The Bellman scholar Lars Lönnroth writes that soon after the real watchmaker Fredman's death in 1767, Bellman had the idea of a ceremony for his burial, complete with a poem that parodied a sermon: "We could call his soul a clockwork, his body a tavern." The idea of a sermon about Fredman was transformed into having him as a preaching prophet who sent epistles to the faithful. That in turn led to a whole series of Fredman's Epistles, the first being what is now called No. 5. Where St Paul had written to the Christian brothers in Ephesus or Corinth, the Bacchanalian St Fredman wrote to the Ale-ephesians and the Cheer-inthians, exhorting them to press grapes for wine. The language is intentionally old-style biblical in tone. In the second verse, Fredman announces that "Brännvins apostlar uppstiga var dag" ("Brandy's apostles rise up each day"), and invites his disciples to "Stöta basuner, förkunna vår lag" ("blow bassoons, proclaim our law"). Finally in the third verse, in the style of Acts of the Apostles, Fredman encourages his correspondent Theophilus to drink, mentioning Damascus, where St Paul had his dramatic conversion: "Drick min Theophile, strupen är djup; Si i Damasco där ligger en Slup, Fuller med flaskor" ("Drink my Theophilus", your throat is deep; See in Damascus there lies a sloop, full of bottles). Lönnroth comments that the lack of a harbour in Damascus would scarcely have troubled Bellman or his audience.

Carina Burman writes in her biography of Bellman that when he wrote this first epistle he certainly did not know he would eventually write another eighty of them: the genre was wholly new and fresh. In a rush of creativity, he wrote nine epistles between March and May 1770, and by the year's end he had written twenty-five. It was not, Burman explains, the first time he joked about religious texts, nor the first in which he mixed spirits and religion, but marked the start of his parodying of St Paul's letters to the faithful. She notes that the diction of Fredman's speech was already antique, echoing the tone of the Charles XII Bible, a translation completed in 1703. For example, Fredman says "världenes ondsko" where more modern Swedish would use "världens ondska" for "the evil of the world". All the same, this first parody of an epistle, described by some scholars as primitive, was still very close to Bellman's usual drinking-songs; later epistles such as No. 9, Käraste Bröder, Systrar och Vänner, became more complex, and biblical parody moved into the background.

The Bellman Society calls the epistle a Bacchanalian mass in which Fredman the preacher encourages his congregation to drunkenness. The Epistle has been recorded by the actor Mikael Samuelson on his album Sjunger Fredmans Epistlar.

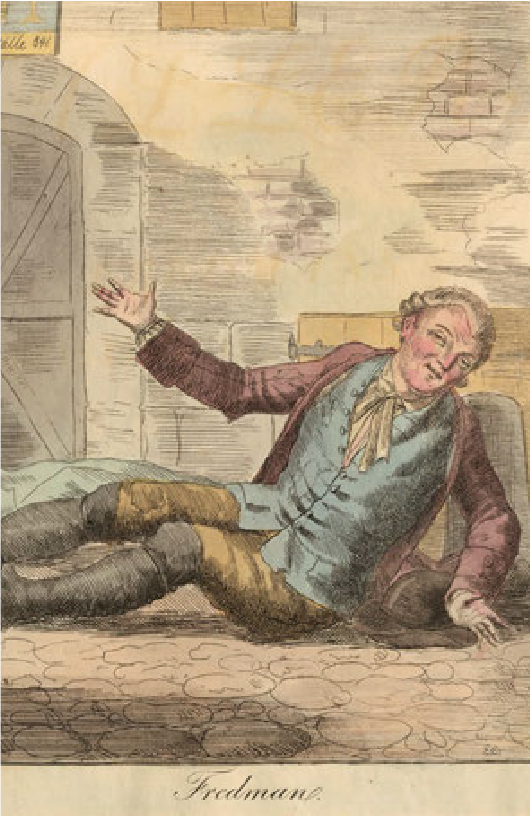
The fictionalised Jean Fredman, watchmaker turned apostle of brandy, lying drunk in a Stockholm street. Early 19th century engraving by Elis Chiewitz.

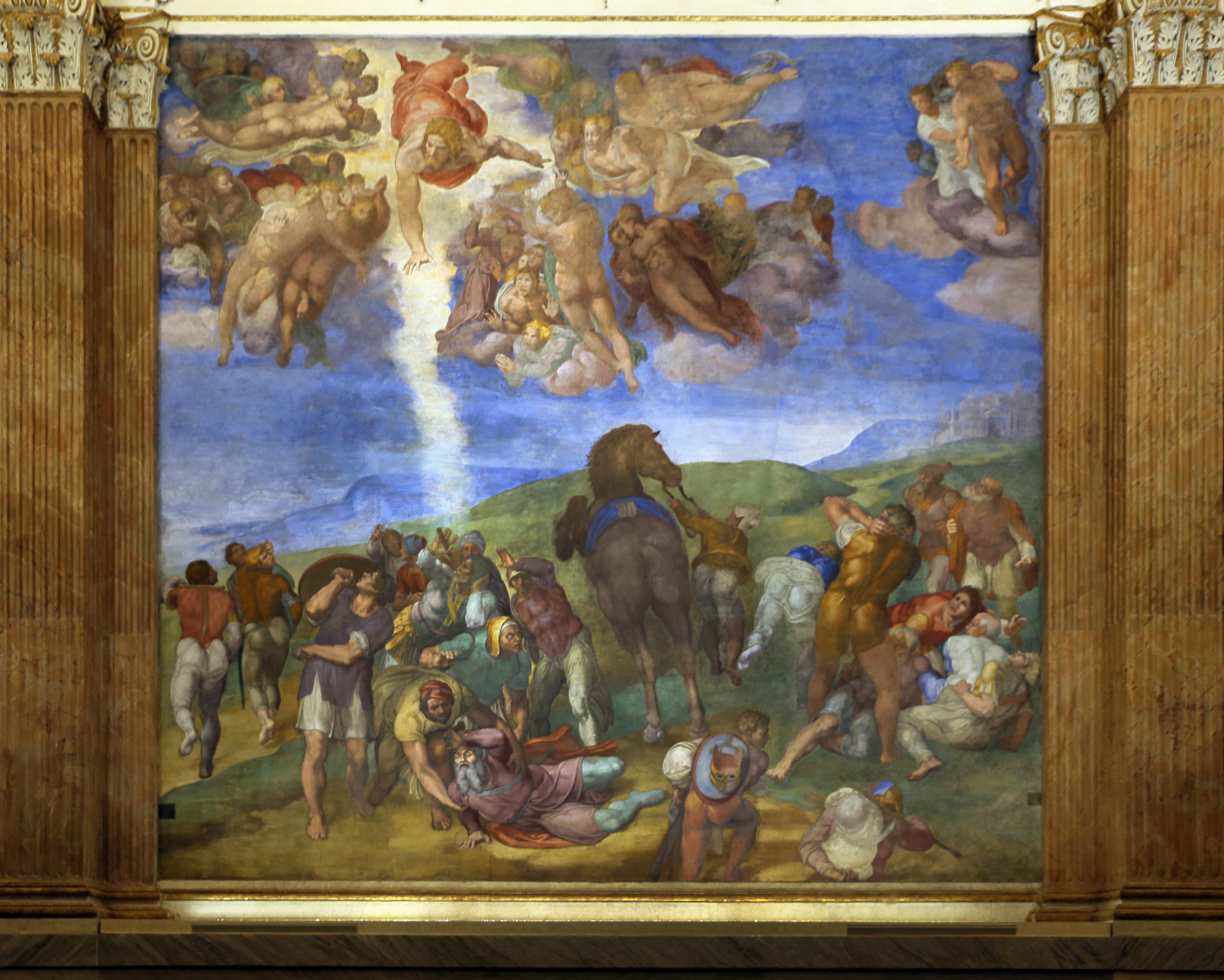
The epistle echoes the tones of St Paul, and alludes to his dramatic conversion on the road to Damascus. Fresco by Michelangelo, 1542-1545.

== Sources ==
- Bellman, Carl Michael (1790). Fredmans epistlar. Stockholm: By Royal Privilege.
- Britten Austin, Paul (1967). The Life and Songs of Carl Michael Bellman: Genius of the Swedish Rococo. New York: Allhem, Malmö American-Scandinavian Foundation. ISBN 978-3-932759-00-0.
- Burman, Carina (2019). Bellman. Biografin [Bellman: The Biography] (in Swedish). Stockholm: Albert Bonniers Förlag. ISBN 978-9100141790.
- Hassler, Göran (1995). Bellman II – en antologi [Bellman II – an anthology]. En bok för alla. ISBN 91-7448-837-6.
- Kleveland, Åse; Ehrén, Svenolov (illus.) (1984). Fredmans epistlar & sånger [The songs and epistles of Fredman]. Stockholm: Informationsförlaget. ISBN 91-7736-059-1. (with facsimiles of sheet music from first editions in 1790, 1791)
- Lönnroth, Lars (2005). Ljuva karneval! : om Carl Michael Bellmans diktning [Lovely Carnival! : about Carl Michael Bellman's Verse]. Stockholm: Bonniers. ISBN 978-91-0-057245-7. OCLC 61881374.
- Massengale, James Rhea (1979). The Musical-Poetic Method of Carl Michael Bellman. Stockholm: Almqvist & Wiksell International. ISBN 91-554-0849-4.
