= Gråt Fader Berg och spela =

Song by the 18th century Swedish bard Carl Michael Bellman

- Art song
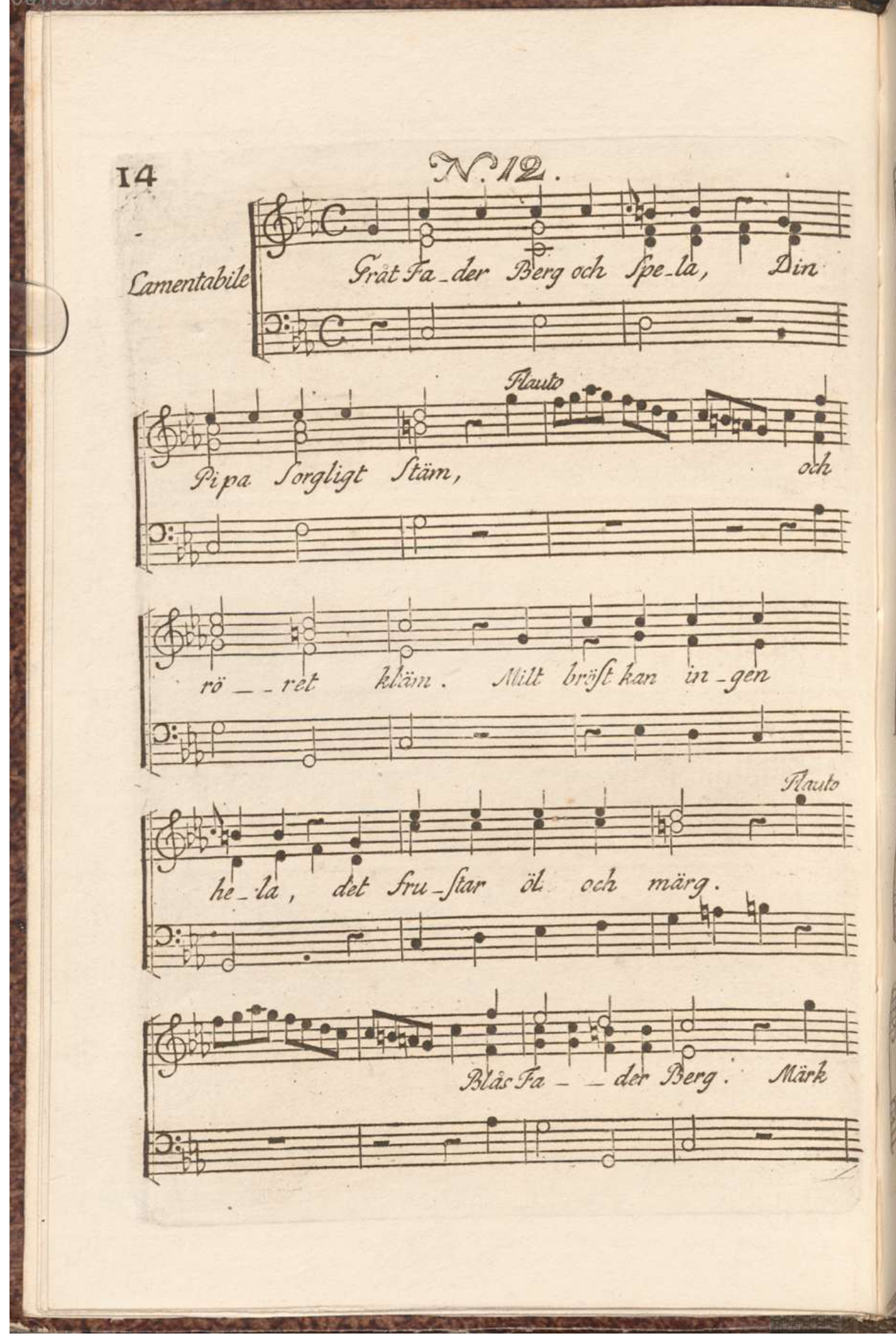
- First page of sheet music, 1810 reprint
- English: Cry, Father Berg, and Play
- Written: 1770
- Text: poem by Carl Michael Bellman
- Language: Swedish
- Melody: An aria from Acis and Galatea
- Composed: 1718
- Published: 1790 in Fredman's Epistles
- Scoring: voice and cittern

Gråt Fader Berg och spela (Cry, Father Berg, and Play) is No. 12 in the Swedish poet and performer Carl Michael Bellman's 1790 song collection, Fredman's Epistles. The epistle is subtitled "Elegi över Slagsmålet på Gröna Lund" ("Elegy on the Battle at Gröna Lund [Tavern]"). It is a lament over a pub brawl, caused by Fredman's drinking a soldier's beer and dancing with someone else's girlfriend. Set to the melody from the aria "The flocks shall leave the mountains" in George Frideric Handel's opera Acis and Galatea, it is the best-known of his poems describing the consequences of brandy-drinking. Bellman used the contrast between the romantic associations of the melody and the brutal reality of heavy drinking to humorous effect.

== Context ==
Carl Michael Bellman is a central figure in the Swedish ballad tradition and a powerful influence in Swedish music, known for his 1790 Fredman's Epistles and his 1791 Fredman's Songs. A solo entertainer, he played the cittern, accompanying himself as he performed his songs at the royal court.

Jean Fredman (1712 or 1713–1767) was a real watchmaker of Bellman's Stockholm. The fictional Fredman, alive after 1767, but without employment, is the supposed narrator in Bellman's epistles and songs. The epistles, written and performed in different styles, from drinking songs and laments to pastorales, paint a complex picture of the life of the city during the 18th century. A frequent theme is the demimonde, with Fredman's cheerfully drunk Order of Bacchus, a loose company of ragged men who favour strong drink and prostitutes. At the same time as depicting this realist side of life, Bellman creates a rococo picture, full of classical allusion, following the French post-Baroque poets. The women, including the beautiful Ulla Winblad, are "nymphs", while Neptune's festive troop of followers and sea-creatures sport in Stockholm's waters. The juxtaposition of elegant and low life is humorous, sometimes burlesque, but always graceful and sympathetic. The songs are "most ingeniously" set to their music, which is nearly always borrowed and skilfully adapted.

== Song ==
=== Music and verse form ===
Melody of Epistle 12
Epistle 12's melody, from Handel's Acis and Galatea

The epistle was written in the summer of 1770, and set to a melody from the aria "The flocks shall leave the mountains" in George Frideric Handel's 1718 opera Acis and Galatea. There are four stanzas, each of twelve lines. The rhyming scheme is ABBA-CCEF-CFCF. Its time signature is 4/4 and its tempo is marked Lamentabile.

=== Lyrics ===
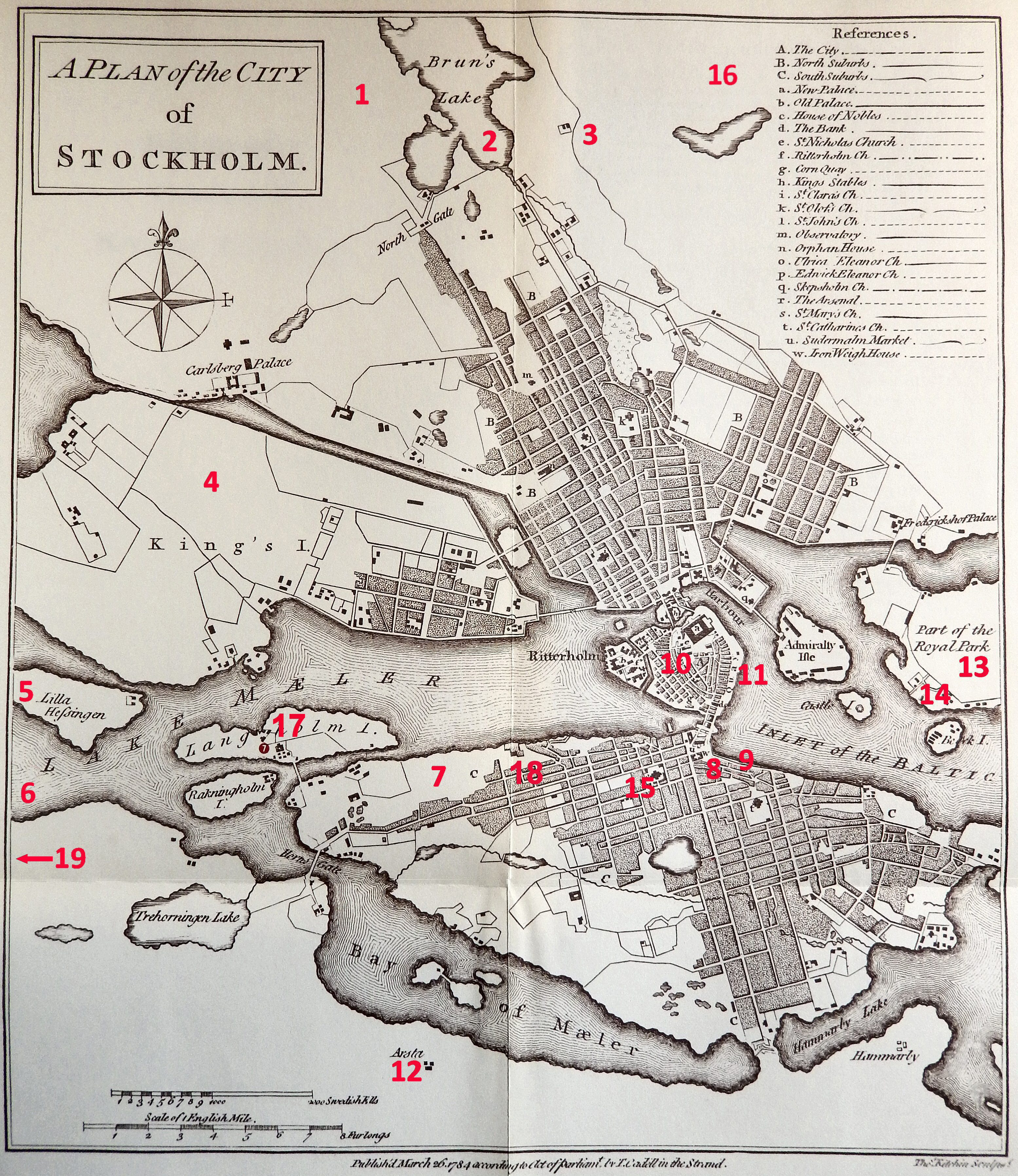
Map of Bellman's Stockholm, places of interest for his Fredman's Epistles and Songs on map from William Coxe's Travels into Poland, Russia, Sweden, and Denmark, 1784. 1 Haga park (S. 64) – 2 Brunnsviken – 3 Första Torpet (Ep. 80) – 4 Kungsholmen – 5 Hessingen (Ep. 48) – 6 Lake Mälaren (Ep. 48) – 7 Södermalm – 8 Urvädersgränd – 9 Lokatten tavern (Ep. 11, Ep. 59, Ep. 77), Bruna Dörren tavern (Ep. 24, Ep. 38) – 10 Gamla stan (Ep. 5, Ep. 9, Ep. 23, Ep. 28, Ep. 79) – 11 Skeppsbron Quay (Ep. 33) – 12 Årsta Castle – 13 Djurgården Park – (Ep. 25, Ep. 51, Ep. 82) – 14 Gröna Lund (Ep. 12, Ep. 62) – 15 Bellman's birthplace – 16 Fiskartorpet (Ep. 71) – 17 Lilla Sjötullen (Bellmanmuseet) (Ep. 48) – 18 Bensvarvars tavern (Ep. 40) 19 Rostock tavern (Ep. 45)

The epistle, like all of Fredman's Epistles, was first published in 1790, towards the end of Bellman's life: he died in 1795. It was No. 12 in the book, and was subtitled "Elegi över Slagsmålet på Gröna Lund" ("Elegy on the Battle at Gröna Lund [Tavern]"). The corpus of epistles did not change after that, though the book has been reprinted repeatedly and translated into other European languages.

In the text, Fredman, accompanied by Father Berg on flute, begins in accordance with a pattern from classical elegies and meditates on the greatness of the past and the ravages of time. It becomes clear that a drinking-place, Stockholm's Gröna Lund Tavern, has been smashed up in a fight. The epistle narrates in a naive preaching style that Fredman, drunk, has taken a soldier's beer and danced with someone else's girl. The song derives its effect from the contrast between the clear melody with its elegiac touch, and harsh reality.

The first stanza of epistle 12
Carl Michael Bellman, 1790

Gråt Fader Berg och spela,
Din pipa sorgligt stäm,
Flauto - - - Och röret kläm.
Mit bröst kan ingen hela,
Det frustar Öl och märg.
Flauto - - - Blås Fader Berg.
Märk denna stora stuga,
Du full af Flickor mins,
Är nu så tom, at knapt en enda fluga
Uti taket fins. - - - Flauto
Här syns ej Jergen Puckel mer med Hatten buga
Som en Prins. - - - Flauto

Paul Britten Austin, 1967

Play, Father Berg, in tears
Thy sorry pipe intone,
Flauto: – – – With sad notes blown.
No man my boson cheers;
I'll breathe a beery air.
Flauto: – – – Blow, Father Berg!
Mark this great hall with feeling
Of girls remember'd full
So empty, scarce a single fly upon its ceiling
Now is seen at all. – – – Flauto
Nor Jergen Puckel with his princely hat, to hearts appealing
In the ball. – – – Flauto

== Reception ==
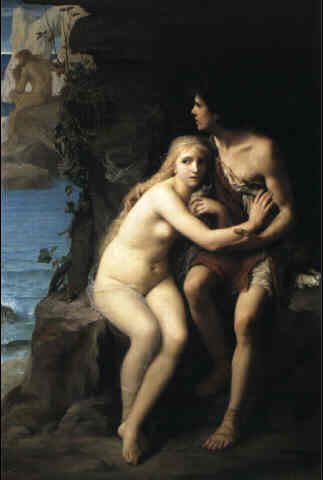
Comic contrast: the epistle about a pub brawl played out against Handel's pastoral aria of love from classical mythology. Painting Acis and Galatea hiding from Polyphemus by Édouard Zier, 1877

The musicologist James Massengale writes that although the melody was borrowed, the amount of work that Bellman had to put into the music for this epistle, as for no. 24 ("Kära Syster!") was "surely tantamount to the production of new melodies." Borrowing was accepted, even encouraged at the time, but the "poetic possibility", Massengale suggests, is that Bellman wished to exploit the humorous contrast between a melody of one type and a story of another, or between an existing image associated with the melody, and a fresh one presented in an epistle. In addition, Bellman was able to use what his audience knew to be borrowed music to reinforce the historical flavour of the epistles, introducing exactly the kind of ambiguity that he was seeking.

The translator and Bellman's biographer Paul Britten Austin calls the epistle "the most famous of the poems lamenting the violent effects of brandy". He finds it "surprising" that Bellman has chosen to take an aria from Handel's Acis and Galatea, but notes that by marking it lamentabile and "cunningly interweav[ing] a flute obbligato with the vocal phrases", he manages to create a "tragi-comic picture".

Carina Burman writes in her biography of Bellman that the tune of the epistle was one of several that Bellman borrowed from Handel's heroic pastoral opera. In the aria, a trio, the two lovers sing of their eternal love "while the jealous Polyphemus mumbles threats". The audience in his day were well aware of that dramatic context, so hearing the melody as a backdrop to the sharply contrasting situation of a pub brawl created a powerfully comic effect.

The song has been recorded by Sven-Bertil Taube on his 1959 album Fredmans epistlar och sånger, Martin Bagge, by Fred Åkerström with Katarina Fritzén and Orjan Larson on his 1974 album Glimmande Nymf, by Peter Ekberg Pelz on his 1985 album C. M. Bellman, and by Mikael Samuelsson on his 1988 album Carl Michael Bellman.

== Sources ==
- Bellman, Carl Michael (1790). Fredmans epistlar [Fredman's Epistles] (in Swedish). Stockholm: By Royal Privilege.
- Britten Austin, Paul (1967). The Life and Songs of Carl Michael Bellman: Genius of the Swedish Rococo. New York: Allhem, Malmö American-Scandinavian Foundation. ISBN 978-3-932759-00-0.
- Burman, Carina (2019). Bellman. Biografin [Bellman: The Biography] (in Swedish). Stockholm: Albert Bonniers Förlag. ISBN 978-9100141790.
- Hassler, Göran; Dahl, Peter (illus.) (1989). Bellman – en antologi [Bellman – an anthology] (in Swedish). En bok för alla. ISBN 91-7448-742-6. (contains the most popular Epistles and Songs, in Swedish, with sheet music)
- Kleveland, Åse; Ehrén, Svenolov (illus.) (1984). Fredmans epistlar & sånger [The songs and epistles of Fredman] (in Swedish). Stockholm: Informationsförlaget. ISBN 91-7736-059-1. (with facsimiles of sheet music from first editions in 1790, 1791)
- Lönnroth, Lars (2005). Ljuva karneval! : om Carl Michael Bellmans diktning [Lovely Carnival! : about Carl Michael Bellman's Verse] (in Swedish). Stockholm: Albert Bonniers Förlag. ISBN 978-91-0-057245-7. OCLC 61881374.
- Massengale, James Rhea (1979). The Musical-Poetic Method of Carl Michael Bellman. Stockholm: Almqvist & Wiksell International. ISBN 91-554-0849-4.
