= Vår Ulla låg i sängen och sov =

1790 song by Swedish bard Carl Michael Bellman

- Art song
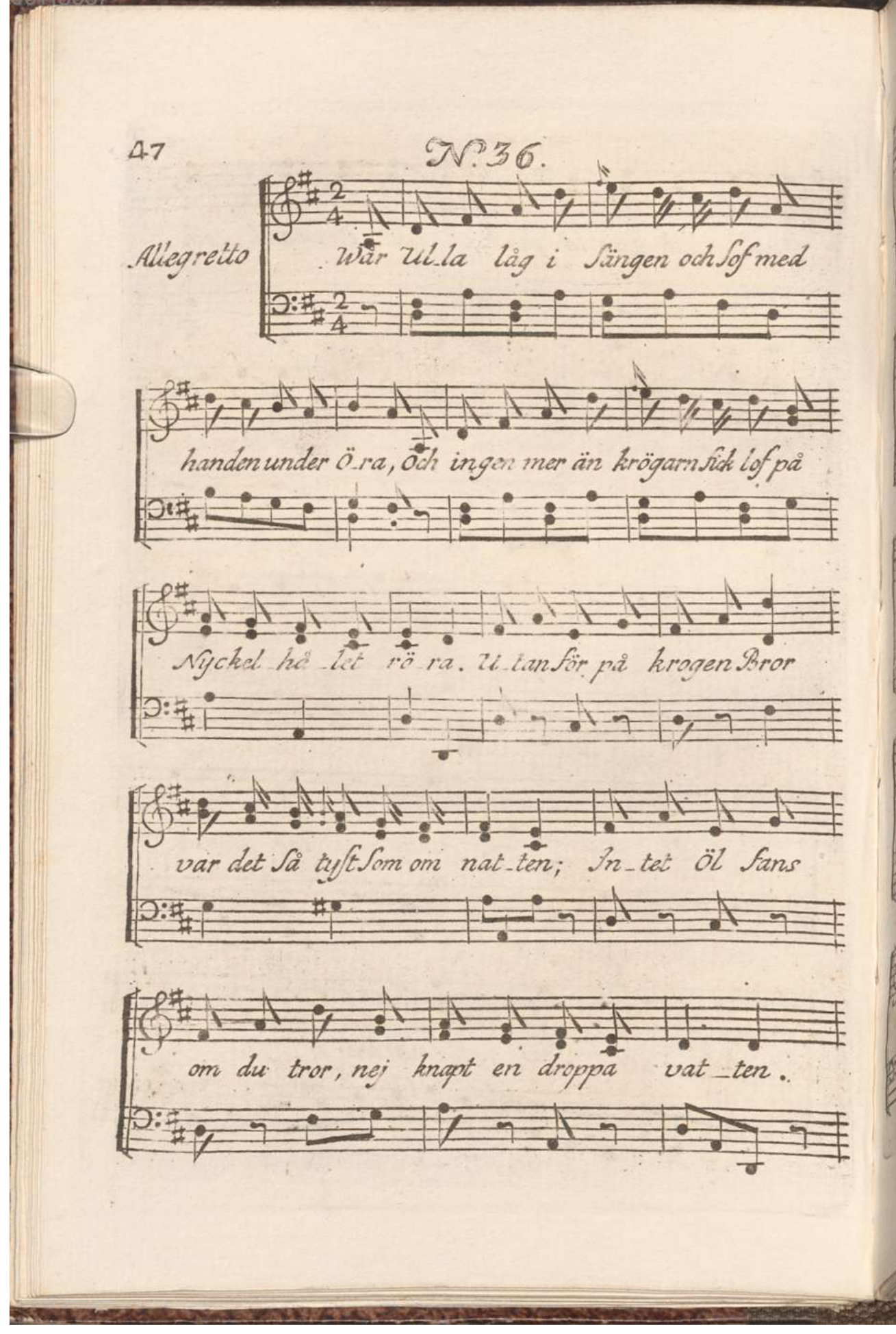
- First page of sheet music for the 1810 edition
- English: Our Ulla lay in bed and slept
- Written: 1773–1776
- Text: poem by Carl Michael Bellman
- Language: Swedish
- Melody: Prins Fredric, a contredanse
- Published: 1790 in Fredman's Epistles
- Scoring: voice, cittern, and horn

Vår Ulla låg i sängen och sov (Our Ulla lay in bed and slept) is Epistle No. 36 in the Swedish poet and performer Carl Michael Bellman's 1790 song collection, Fredman's Epistles. The epistle is subtitled "Rörande Ulla Winblad's flykt" (Concerning Ulla Winblad's flight). It begins with the innkeeper peeping through the keyhole to her bedroom and whispering with his friends as she sleeps, slowly waking up. Then she dresses ornately and enters the tavern, delighting the menfolk until she is suddenly arrested.

The epistle has been praised as a perfect example of Bellman's rococo style, narrated with a mix of earthy and poetic detail.

== Background ==
Carl Michael Bellman is a central figure in the Swedish ballad tradition and a powerful influence in Swedish music, known for his 1790 Fredman's Epistles and his 1791 Fredman's Songs. A solo entertainer, he played the cittern, accompanying himself as he performed his songs at the royal court.

Jean Fredman (1712 or 1713–1767) was a real watchmaker of Bellman's Stockholm. The fictional Fredman, alive after 1767, but without employment, is the supposed narrator in Bellman's epistles and songs. The epistles, written and performed in different styles, from drinking songs and laments to pastorales, paint a complex picture of the life of the city during the 18th century. A frequent theme is the demimonde, with Fredman's cheerfully drunk Order of Bacchus, a loose company of ragged men who favour strong drink and prostitutes. At the same time as depicting this realist side of life, Bellman creates a rococo picture, full of classical allusion, following the French post-Baroque poets. The women, including the beautiful Ulla Winblad, are "nymphs", while Neptune's festive troop of followers and sea-creatures sport in Stockholm's waters. The juxtaposition of elegant and low life is humorous, sometimes burlesque, but always graceful and sympathetic. The songs are "most ingeniously" set to their music, which is nearly always borrowed and skilfully adapted.

== Epistle ==
=== Music and verse form ===
Melody of Epistle 36

The song has nine stanzas, each of eighteen lines. It is in 2/4 time, marked Allegretto. The rhyming pattern is ABAB-CDCD-EFEF-GGH-IIH.

The source of the melody is a contredanse called Prins Fredric.

=== Lyrics ===
The actor Constance Byström playing Ulla Winblad in 18th century dress and bo-peep hat in 1908 for a performance of Ernst Didring's play Två konungar ("Two Kings", about Bellman and Gustav the third) at the Swedish Theatre, Helsinki

The song was written sometime between 1773 and 1776. The epistle begins with the innkeeper whispering with his friends and peeping through the keyhole to Ulla bedroom as she lies asleep, gradually waking up. She stirs uneasily, wakes, and adorns herself in a manner "worthy of a Marie Antoinette": she "sprinkles her bosom 'with wine and rosewater', twines a pearl bracelet round her wrist and adorns her locks with a bo-peep hat". She enters the tavern, delighting the menfolk with her charms, and drinks a brandy with a lump of sugar. Then, disaster strikes: four ragged bailiffs arrive, arrest her, ignoring her shrieks, and lead her away.

Versions of the eighth stanza of Epistle No. 36
Carl Michael Bellman, 1770

Men himmel ach! hur bytes alt om!
Bäst Ulla ömsa stubbar,
I dörrn på tröskeln, gissa hvem kom,
Jo fyra halta gubbar:
En med värja sned och vind,
Och med en tågstump den andra,
Och den tredje som var blind,
Tog Nymphen bort och vandra.
Himmel ach! hvad larm och skrik!
Vår Ullas rop mig sårar;
Hvarje gäst satt blek som lik,
Och krögarn fälde tårar.
Qvar på bänken
Fram om skänken,
Där står Ullas Bränvins-glas,
Tomt och spruckit
Och utdruckit.
Så slöts vårt Calas.

Paul Britten Austin, 1977

But heav'ns, alas! Ah, gods, what a change!
As Ulla sheds her flounces,
Guess in the doorway there what a strange
Catchpole himself announces.
Four blind (Note: Bellman has halta, "lame".) cripples, one boss-eyed,
One with a sabre, hard-hearted;
Another with a rope's end tied
The nymph, sir, and departed.
Alas! Alack! What woe, what wrack!
Her shrieks and screams torment me.
Ev'ry guest turn'd pale as death
Mine host shed tears aplenty.
On her bench,
Poor hapless wench,
Stands our Ulla's brandy-glass,
Fresh-bespoken.
Empty. Broken.
So our pleasures pass.

== Reception and legacy ==
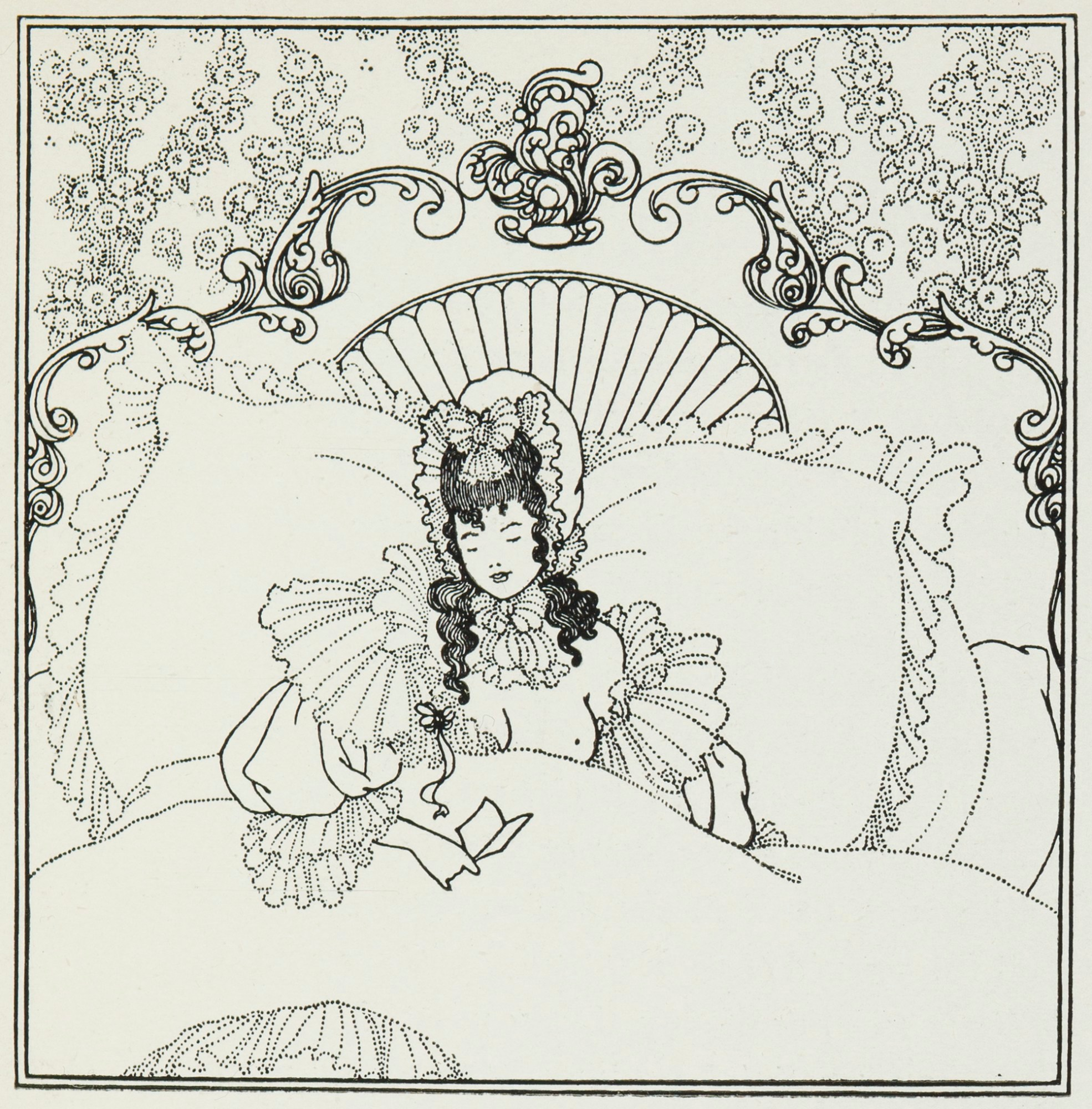
1896 illustration by Aubrey Beardsley for Alexander Pope's 1712–1717 The Rape of the Lock, a poem which may have influenced the Epistle.

The epistle is in the opinion of Bellman's biographer, Paul Britten Austin, "a perfect—perhaps the perfect—example of Bellman at his most rococo". He writes that it is narrated with "a delightful blend of earthy and poetic detail, shimmering with humour". In his view, it is a "splendid poem, wherein Bellman shows immeasurable artistry, balance, and subtlety of effect". He states that it cannot, as earlier proposed, have been a response to William Hogarth's A Rake's Progress, and has none of Hogarth's moralization, but could perhaps be echoing Alexander Pope's The Rape of the Lock.

Carina Burman writes in her biography of Bellman that people have from time to time wanted to change a word in the Epistle. The Bellman interpreter Cornelis Vreeswijk for some reason sings it with the word vattenglas ("water-glass") in place of Ulla's Bränvins-glas, a brandy-glass. The poet Per Daniel Amadeus Atterbom took issue with the word dunder, lit. "thunder", meaning a fart that Ulla releases as she climbs into bed, pulling the quilt over her head. Burman comments that it is interesting that Atterbom took exception to a bodily function rather than sex.

The Epistle has been recorded by Mikael Samuelson and by Cornelis Vreeswijk.

== Sources ==
- Bellman, Carl Michael (1790). Fredmans epistlar. Stockholm: By Royal Privilege.
- Britten Austin, Paul (1967). The Life and Songs of Carl Michael Bellman: Genius of the Swedish Rococo. New York: Allhem, Malmö American-Scandinavian Foundation. ISBN 978-3-932759-00-0.
- Britten Austin, Paul (1977). Fredman's Epistles and Songs: A Selection in English. Stockholm: Reuter & Reuter. OCLC 186784336.
- Burman, Carina (2019). Bellman. Biografin [Bellman: The Biography] (in Swedish). Stockholm: Albert Bonniers Förlag. ISBN 978-9100141790.
- Hassler, Göran; Dahl, Peter (illus.) (1989). Bellman – en antologi [Bellman – an anthology]. En bok för alla. ISBN 91-7448-742-6. (contains the most popular Epistles and Songs, in Swedish, with sheet music)
- Kleveland, Åse; Ehrén, Svenolov (illus.) (1984). Fredmans epistlar & sånger [The songs and epistles of Fredman]. Stockholm: Informationsförlaget. ISBN 91-7736-059-1. (with facsimiles of sheet music from first editions in 1790, 1791)
- Massengale, James Rhea (1979). The Musical-Poetic Method of Carl Michael Bellman. Stockholm: Almqvist & Wiksell International. ISBN 91-554-0849-4.
