= Ulla Winblad =

Fictional character created by Carl Michael Bellman

Constance Byström playing Ulla Winblad in 18th century dress and bo-peep hat, in 1908

Ulla Winblad is a semi-fictional character in many of Carl Michael Bellman's musical works. She is at once an idealised rococo goddess and a tavern prostitute, and a key figure in Bellman's songs of Fredman's Epistles. The juxtaposition of elegant and low life is humorous, while allowing Bellman to convey a range of emotions. Ulla Winblad has been called "one of the really great female figures in Swedish literature". The character was partly inspired by Maria Kristina Kiellström (1744–1798).

== Context ==
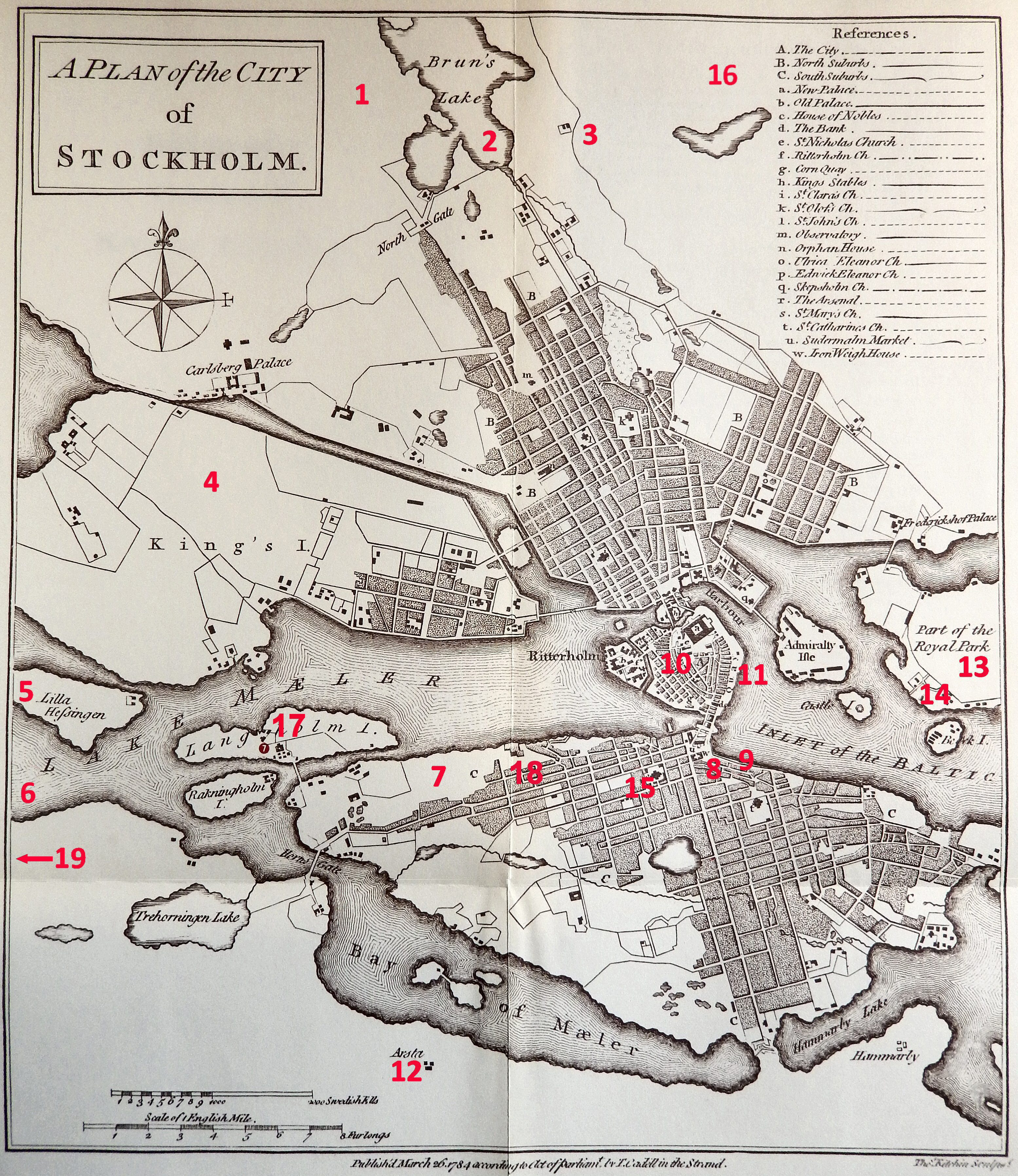
Map of Bellman's Stockholm, places of interest for his Fredman's Epistles and Songs on map from William Coxe's Travels into Poland, Russia, Sweden, and Denmark, 1784. 1 Haga park (S. 64) – 2 Brunnsviken – 3 Första Torpet (Ep. 80) – 4 Kungsholmen – 5 Hessingen (Ep. 48) – 6 Lake Mälaren (Ep. 48) – 7 Södermalm – 8 Urvädersgränd – 9 Lokatten tavern (Ep. 11, Ep. 59, Ep. 77), Bruna Dörren tavern (Ep. 24, Ep. 38) – 10 Gamla stan (Ep. 5, Ep. 9, Ep. 23, Ep. 28, Ep. 79) – 11 Skeppsbron Quay (Ep. 33) – 12 Årsta Castle – 13 Djurgården Park – (Ep. 25, Ep. 51, Ep. 82) – 14 Gröna Lund (Ep. 12, Ep. 62) – 15 Bellman's birthplace – 16 Fiskartorpet (Ep. 71) – 17 Lilla Sjötullen (Bellmanmuseet) (Ep. 48) – 18 Bensvarvars tavern (Ep. 40) 19 Rostock tavern (Ep. 45)

Carl Michael Bellman is a central figure in the Swedish ballad tradition and a powerful influence in Swedish music, known for his 1790 Fredman's Epistles and his 1791 Fredman's Songs. A solo entertainer, he played the cittern, accompanying himself as he performed his songs at the royal court.

The epistles, written and performed in different styles, from drinking songs and laments to pastorales, paint a complex picture of the life of the city of Stockholm during the 18th century. A frequent theme is the demimonde, with Fredman's cheerfully drunk Order of Bacchus, a loose company of ragged men who favour strong drink and prostitutes. At the same time as depicting this realist side of life, Bellman creates a rococo picture, full of classical allusion, following the French post-Baroque poets. The women, including the beautiful Ulla Winblad, are "nymphs", while Neptune's festive troop of followers and sea-creatures sport in Stockholm's waters. The juxtaposition of elegant and low life is humorous, sometimes burlesque, but always graceful and sympathetic. The songs are "most ingeniously" set to their music, which is nearly always borrowed and skilfully adapted.

== Origins ==
Ulla Winblad features repeatedly in Fredman's Epistles. Some of her appearances are in songs about taverns in and around Stockholm; others are in pastorales, set in leafy places near the city, or on boats crossing its waterways and lakes. Alongside her is a cast of contemporary Stockholmers, accompanied by figures from classical and Norse mythology.

Fredman's Epistles featuring Ulla Winblad
Number	First line	Dedication	Theme	Mortals	Immortals	Location, notes
3	Fader Berg i hornet stöter	Til en och hvar af Systrarna, men enkannerligen till Ulla Winblad	Wine, Women, Song, Horn	Fader Berg, Jergen Puckel, Ulla Winblad	Charon, Paris, Helen, Freya	Introduces Ulla Winblad
6	Käraste Bröder Systrar och Vänner	Til de Galimater på hinsidon den Konungsliga Djurgårdenom	Wine, Women, Song	Ulla Winblad		Djurgården
7	Fram med basfiolen, knäpp och skruva	Som synes vara en Elegie, skriven vid Ulla Winblads säng, sent om aftonen	Muse	Ulla Winblad, Fader Berg	Freya	
11	Hej! sade Fredman hvar gång han hörde Valdthorn börja skråla	Til Bröderne och Systrarna på Lokatten	Wine, Women, Song	Ulla Winblad	Cupid	Lokatten (Lynx Tavern)
25	Blåsen nu alla	Som är ett försök till en pastoral i bacchanalisk smak, skriven vid Ulla Winblads överfart till Djurgården	Pastorale	Ulla Winblad	Neptune, Venus/Freya, Zephyrs, water nymphs, Tritons, Palaemon	Water crossing to Djurgården
28	I går såg jag ditt barn, min Fröja	Om ett anställt försåt emot Ulla Winblad	Muse	Ulla Winblad	Freya, Themis	Yxsmedsgränd
36	Vår Ulla låg i sängen och sov	Rörande Ulla Winblads flykt	Muse	Ulla Winblad	Apollo, Astrild, Bacchus, Freya	
42	Ren Calas jag spår och tror	Rörande Kortspelet på Klubben	Cards	Mollberg, mor Wingmark, Ulla Winblad		The club, Mälaren
43	Värm mer Öl och Bröd	Til Ulla Winblad, skrifven vid et ömt tilfälle	Muse	Ulla Winblad	Astrild	The birthing-room
48	Solen glimmar blank och trind	Hvaruti afmålas Ulla Winblads hemresa från Hessingen i Mälaren en sommarmorgon 1769	Pastorale	Ulla Winblad, Movitz	Neptune	Lake Mälaren back to Stockholm
49	Mamsell Ulla, märk Mamsell	Angående Landstigningen vid Klubben i Mälaren en sommar-afton 1769	Pastorale	Ulla Winblad, Mollberg	Bacchus	The club, Mälaren
50	Phoebus förnyar	Om des sista Ögnekast på Ulla Winblad vid Hännes återfart ifrån Djurgården	Pastorale, Rococo	Ulla Winblad, Movitz	Jupiter, Neptune, Pan, Cupids, Freya	Return from Djurgården
51	Movitz blåste en Concert	Angående Concerten på Tre Byttor	Wine, Women, Song	Movitz, Ulla Winblad, Wingmark, Bergström, Berg	Eol, Neptune, Orpheus	Tre Byttor Tavern
69	Se Dansmästarn Mollberg, Bröder	Om Mollberg Dansmästare	Dance, Life	Mollberg, Ulla Winblad		
70	Movitz vik mössan högt öfver öra	Om något som passerade i Artilleri-Lägret Anno 1773		Movitz, Ulla Winblad		
71	Ulla! min Ulla! säj får jag dig bjuda	Till Ulla i fönstret på Fiskartorpet	Pastorale	Ulla Winblad, Jean Fredman		Fiskartorpet
80	Liksom en Herdinna, högtids klädd	Angående Ulla Winblads Lustresa til Första Torpet, utom Kattrumps Tullen	Pastorale	Ulla Winblad, Mollberg	Flora, Jupiter	Första Torpet, outside Kattrump Tollgate
82	Hvila vid denna källa	Eller Oförmodade Afsked, förkunnadt vid Ulla Winblads Frukost en sommar-morgon i det gröna	Pastorale	Ulla Winblad, Fredman	Bacchus, Clotho, Charon, Eolus, Freya	

== After Bellman ==
Ulla Winblad remains a popular character in Sweden and other countries, where Bellman's songs continue to be performed, both directly and adapted into theatre productions. In 1908, she was played by Constance Byström in Ernst Didring's play Två konungar ("Two Kings", about Bellman and Gustav the third) at the Swedish Theatre, Helsinki. In 1953 Carl Zuckmayer put on his play Ulla Winblad in Germany, to popular acclaim.

== Ulla and the real Maria Kristina Kiellström ==
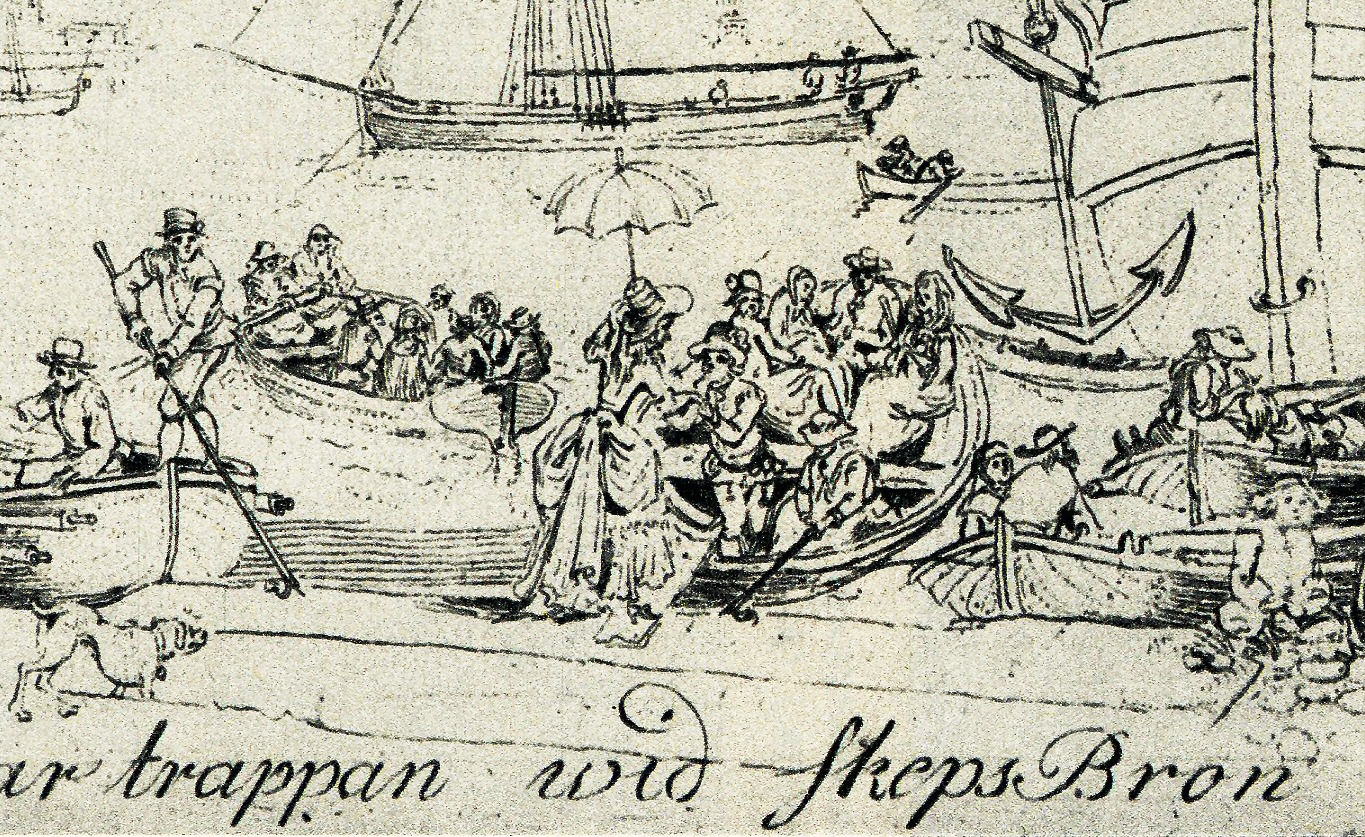
Detail from etching "The steps on Skeppsbro" depicting a scene in Stockholm's harbour by Elias Martin, 1800. The central figure is popularly supposed to represent Ulla Winblad.

The fictional Ulla Winblad and the real Maria Kristina Kiellström have frequently been confused, but were not at all the same. Burman comments that she was not "on the slide" but a quite ordinary woman, "not a prostitute, not a bride of Bacchus and not a goddess of love either. Just as little was she a Vestal Virgin." Kiellström, born in 1744 in a poor family, did borrow her stepmother's surname, Winblad (the name means vine-leaf). About 1763, she found a job in a silk factory. At the age of about twenty Kiellström became notorious for being made pregnant by a Swedish nobleman, Count Wilhelm Schildt. The child died; he abandoned her. Further notoriety came in 1767: while she was without regular employment, she was accused of wearing a red silk cape, a banned luxury item; but unlike Ulla, she was acquitted. By 1770, Kiellström had moved out of the town centre; she and another girl, whose name was Ulla, were both officially recorded as being suspected by their landlord of "loose living".

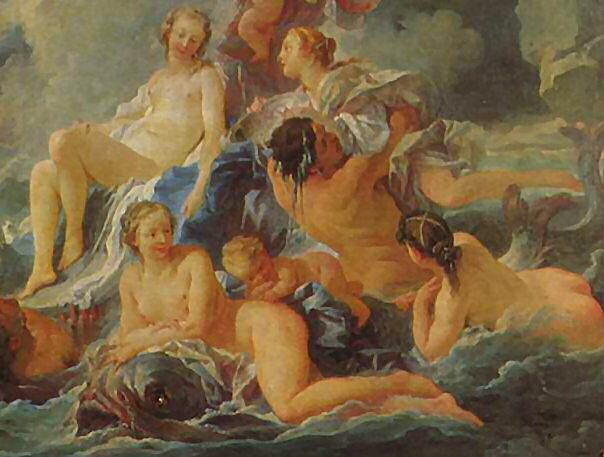
Carl Michael Bellman sang of Ulla Winblad in Fredman's Epistle 25, which seems to depict a Rococo scene like François Boucher's 1740 Birth of Venus, which then hung in Drottningholm Palace, near Stockholm

Bellman met Kiellström in about 1769. Soon afterwards, he sang of Ulla Winblad for the first time in Fredman's Epistle number 25, Blåsen nu alla, subtitled Which is an attempt at a pastoral in Bacchanalian taste, written on Ulla Winblad's crossing to Djurgården. It begins with rococo "angels, dolphins, zephyrs and the whole might of Paphos" (compare Boucher's Birth of Venus) and musical flourishes on the horn ("Corno") and ends with Ulla as "my nymph" and the sentiment "May love come into our lives".

Bellman worked up the silk cape incident into the rococo Epistle 28, I går såg jag ditt barn, min Fröja, where Fredman sees a "goddess", elegantly dressed, with illegally flounced and frilled petticoats.

Kiellström married a customs officer, Eric Nordström, in 1772: Bellman found him his job. The couple lived very close to Bellman, and Norström too appears in the Epistles; a "quarrelsome violent man" and a drinker, he died in a police cell. Kiellström, still attractive, remarried at the age of 42; her second husband, 11 years younger than her, complained that she was "generally and in printed songs known for passionate living."

== The mythic Ulla ==
Edvard Matz, author of a book about Carl Michael Bellman's women, calls Ulla "one of the really great female figures in Swedish literature". Bellman's English biographer, Paul Britten Austin, summarizes Ulla's dual nature, both romanticised and sexual: "Ulla is at once a nymph of the taverns and a goddess of a rococo universe of graceful and hot imaginings". Fredman's Epistles are distinctive in combining realism - drink, poverty, gambling, prostitution, old age - with elegant mythological rococo flourishes, enabling Bellman to achieve both comic and elegiac effects. Britten Austin cites the Swedish critic Nils Afzelius: "Several of the most personal poems are staged with a heavy overlay of classical mythology ... It is as if a curtain with a whole rococo world of gods and goddesses on rosy clouds ... were suddenly raised, revealing a tavern-interior with shaky chairs, spilled and shattered glasses, staggering clients and sluttish barmaids [N. Afzelius).]" Ulla Winblad is, as Carina Burman writes, the only female character in Fredman's Epistles to have her own surname. The others may have a first name, like Lotta or Jeanna, or may simply be known by the tavern where they work, like Mutter på Tuppen ("Mother at the Cockerel [Tavern]").

The sluttiest of the barmaids, though as Britten Austin writes "on the rosiest mythological clouds", is of course Ulla. In Epistle 36 Vår Ulla låg i sängen och sov, (Our Ulla lay in bed and slept), Bellman in full rococo style describes Ulla asleep in a tavern bedroom - while the owner peeps through the keyhole and three excited drunks wait outside. As she wakes, three rococo cupids assist her with make-up, perfume, and her hair. Then she runs into the bar, revives herself with a glass of brandy, and leaves with the blindest of the waiting fellows, "leaving the inmates of the tavern, shaken, to contemplate Ulla's glass where she has left it, empty and broken on the bar."

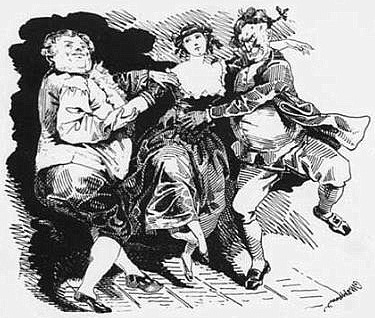
Illustration for "Ulla Winblad kära syster. Du är eldig, qvick och yster...". Fredman's Epistle No. 3, by Carl Wahlbom (d. 1858)

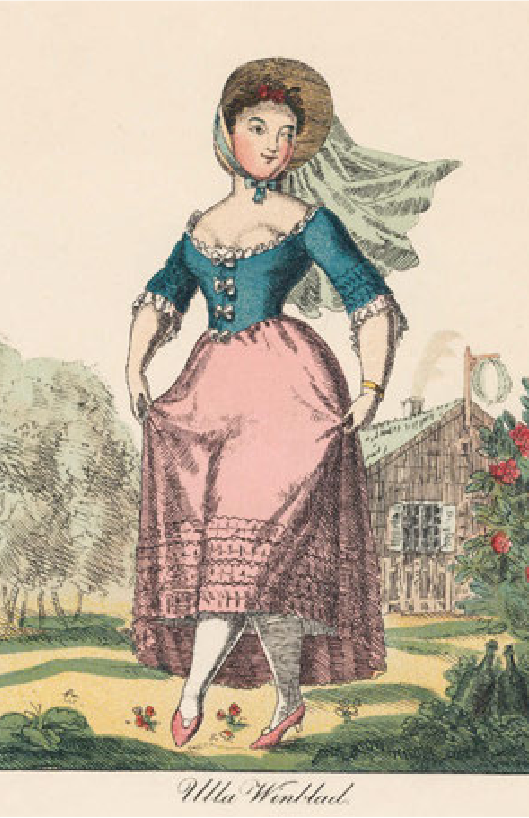
Ulla Winblad by Elis Chiewitz (d. 1839)

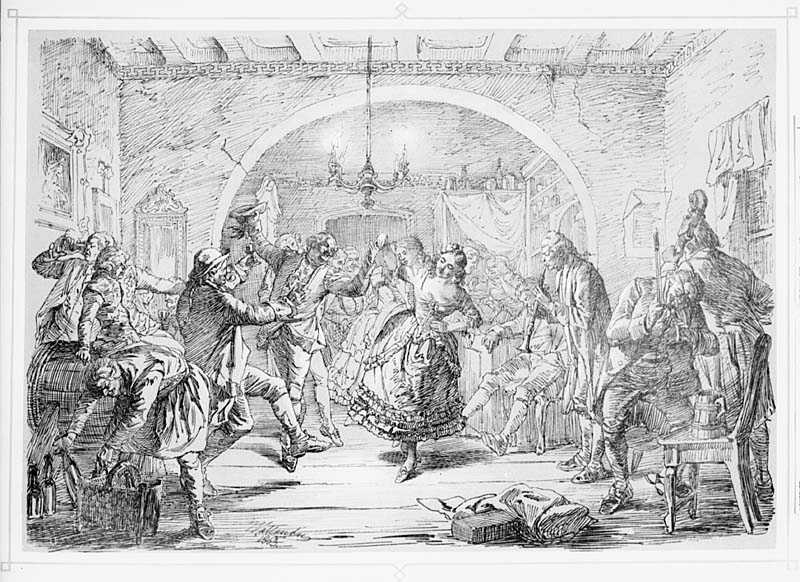
"Ulla dansar menuett": Ulla Winblad dances a minuet. Lithograph by Wilhelm Wallander (d. 1888)

The Ulla Winblad depicted in Fredman's Epistles is at once romanticised and clearly sexual. Epistle 71, in Britten Austin's words "the apogee, perhaps, of all that is typically bellmansk" evokes the Swedish countryside at Djurgården in summertime, as Bellman imagines riding out of town and finding Ulla at her window. The song is called a Pastorale, and titled "To Ulla at her window, Fiskartorpet, lunchtime, one summer's day". It begins

Ulla, min Ulla, säj, får jag dig bjuda
rödaste smultron i mjölk och vin,...

Ulla, my Ulla, say may I offer you
reddest strawberries in milk and wine...

The scholar of Swedish literature Lars Lönnroth writes that the song is a serenade, originally a profession of love set to the strings of a guitar outside the beloved's window of an evening. In Bellman's hands, the setting is shifted to midday in a Swedish summer. Fredman can, Lönnroth writes, be supposed to have spent the night with Ulla after an evening of celebration; now he sits on his horse outside her window and sings to her. In the first half of each verse, in the major key, he speaks straight to Ulla, offering his love in the form of delicious food and drink; in the second half, the refrain, in the minor key, he encourages her more softly to admire nature all around, and she replies with a meditative word or two: "Heavenly!"; "Oh yes!". There is, furthermore, a definite erotic charge, increasing in each of the three verses. In the first verse, the house's doors are suggestively blown open by the wind, while in the last verse, the neighing, stamping, galloping horse appears as a sexual metaphor alongside Fredman's expressed passion.

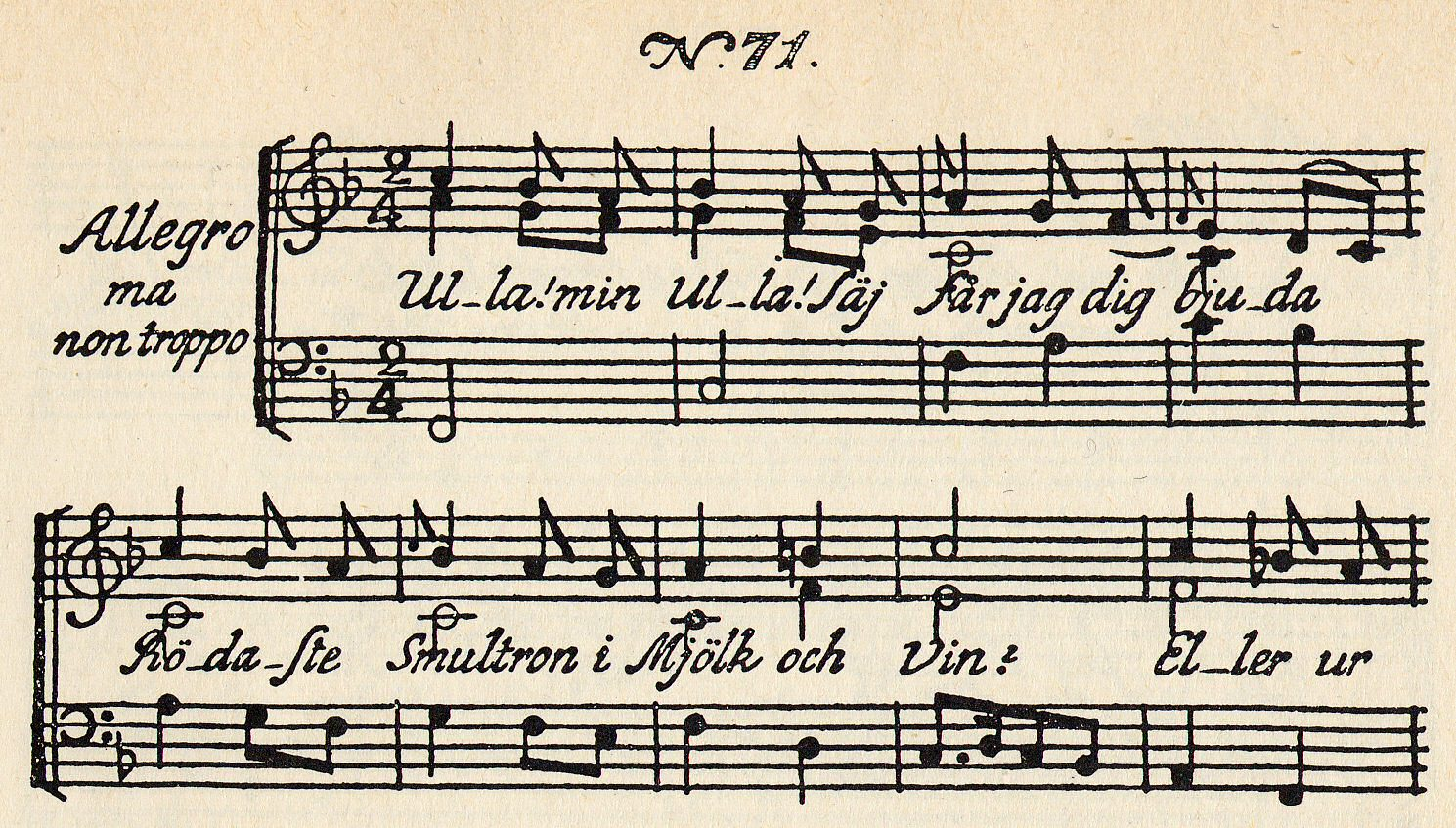
The start of Fredman's Epistle no 71,
Ulla, min Ulla, säj, får jag dig bjuda

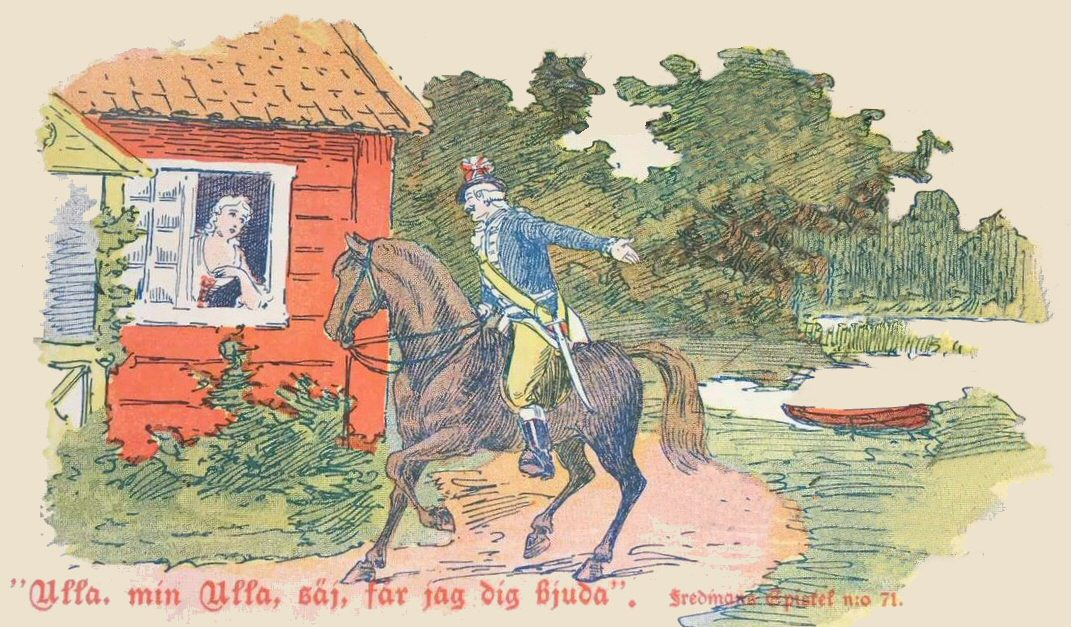
A serenade at Fiskartorpet: Coloured postcard of Epistle 71, Ulla! min Ulla!, with Fredman on his horse, and Ulla Winblad at her window, 1903

== See also ==
- Österlånggatan
- Ulla von Höpken

== Bibliography ==
- Bellman, Carl Michael (1790). Fredmans epistlar. Stockholm: By Royal Privilege.
- Britten Austin, Paul (1967). The Life and Songs of Carl Michael Bellman: Genius of the Swedish Rococo. New York: Allhem, Malmö American-Scandinavian Foundation. ISBN 978-3-932759-00-0.
- Britten Austin, Paul. Fredman's Epistles and Songs, (Stockholm: Proprius, 1999).
- Burman, Carina (2019). Bellman. Biografin [Bellman. The Biography] (in Swedish). Stockholm: Albert Bonniers Förlag. ISBN 978-9100141790.
- Hassler, Göran; Dahl, Peter (illus.) (1989). Bellman - en antologi [Bellman - an anthology]. En bok för alla. ISBN 91-7448-742-6.
- Kleveland, Åse (1984). Fredmans epistlar & sånger [The songs and epistles of Fredman]. Svenolov Ehrén (illus.). Stockholm: Informationsförlaget. ISBN 91-7736-059-1. (with facsimiles of sheet music from first editions in 1790, 1791)
- Lönnroth, Lars (2005). Ljuva karneval! : om Carl Michael Bellmans diktning [Lovely Carnival! : about Carl Michael Bellman's Verse]. Stockholm: Albert Bonniers Förlag. ISBN 978-91-0-057245-7. OCLC 61881374.
- Matz, Edvard (2015). Carl Michael Bellman Nymfer och friska kalas [Carl Michael Bellman: Nymphs and Lively Parties] (in Swedish). Historiska Media. ISBN 978-91-7545-218-0. OCLC 941607965.
- Roberts, Michael. Epistles and Songs, (Grahamstown, three volumes, 1977–1981).
- Stork, Charles Wharton. Anthology of Swedish Lyrics from 1750 to 1915, (New York: The American-Scandinavian Foundation, 1917). OCLC 1393517
- Van Loon, Hendrik Willem; Castagnetta, Grace. The Last of the Troubadours, (New York: Simon and Schuster, 1939). OCLC 1472172
