= I går såg jag ditt barn, min Fröja =

Song by the 18th century Swedish bard Carl Michael Bellman

- Art song
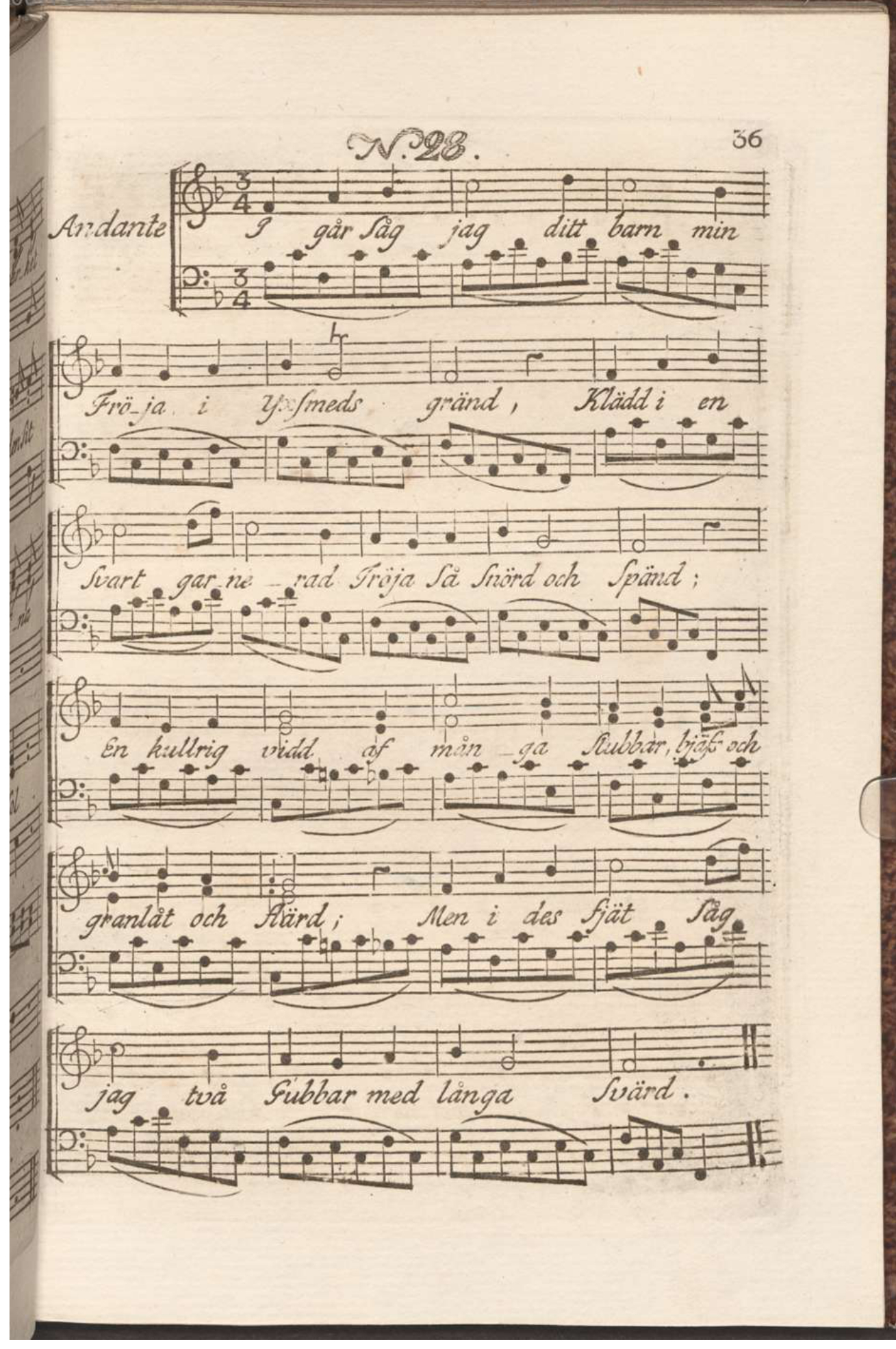
- First page of sheet music for the 1790 edition
- English: Yesterday saw I your child, my Freya
- Written: 17 August 1771
- Text: poem by Carl Michael Bellman
- Language: Swedish
- Melody: Languedoc folk tune reworked by Joseph Martin Kraus
- Published: 1790 in Fredman's Epistles
- Scoring: voice and cittern

I går såg jag ditt barn, min Fröja (Yesterday saw I your child, my Freya), is a ballad from the Swedish poet and performer Carl Michael Bellman's 1790 collection, Fredman's Epistles, where it is No. 28. The epistle is subtitled "Om et anstäldt försåt emot Ulla Winblad." (About an ambush of Ulla Winblad). It describes an attempt to arrest the "nymph" Ulla Winblad, based on a real event. The lyrics create a rococo picture of life, blending classical allusion and pastoral description with harsh reality.

== Context ==
Carl Michael Bellman is a central figure in the Swedish ballad tradition and a powerful influence in Swedish music, known for his 1790 Fredman's Epistles and his 1791 Fredman's Songs. A solo entertainer, he played the cittern, accompanying himself as he performed his songs at the royal court.

Jean Fredman (1712 or 1713–1767) was a real watchmaker of Bellman's Stockholm. The fictional Fredman, alive after 1767, but without employment, is the supposed narrator in Bellman's epistles and songs. The epistles, written and performed in different styles, from drinking songs and laments to pastorales, paint a complex picture of the life of the city during the 18th century. A frequent theme is the demimonde, with Fredman's cheerfully drunk Order of Bacchus, a loose company of ragged men who favour strong drink and prostitutes. At the same time as depicting this realist side of life, Bellman creates a rococo picture, full of classical allusion, following the French post-Baroque poets. The women, including the beautiful Ulla Winblad, are "nymphs", while Neptune's festive troop of followers and sea-creatures sport in Stockholm's waters. The juxtaposition of elegant and low life is humorous, sometimes burlesque, but always graceful and sympathetic. The songs are "most ingeniously" set to their music, which is nearly always borrowed and skilfully adapted.

== Song ==
=== Music and verse form ===
Melody of Epistle 28
A reworked Languedoc folk tune

The song has five verses, each of 8 lines. The verses have the alternating rhyming pattern ABAB-CDCD. The music is in 3/4 time, and is marked Andante. The melody was reworked by Joseph Martin Kraus from a Languedoc folk tune; it is accompanied throughout by rapid, nervous quavers (eighth notes), giving the Epistle in Edward Matz's view a cinematic slow motion effect. The melody was used by "several parodists" in the 18th century; it had timbres (named melodies) including "Quoi–" and "Ah! ma voisine, es-tu fâchée?" which the musicologist James Massengale suggests Bellman may have had in mind.

=== Lyrics ===
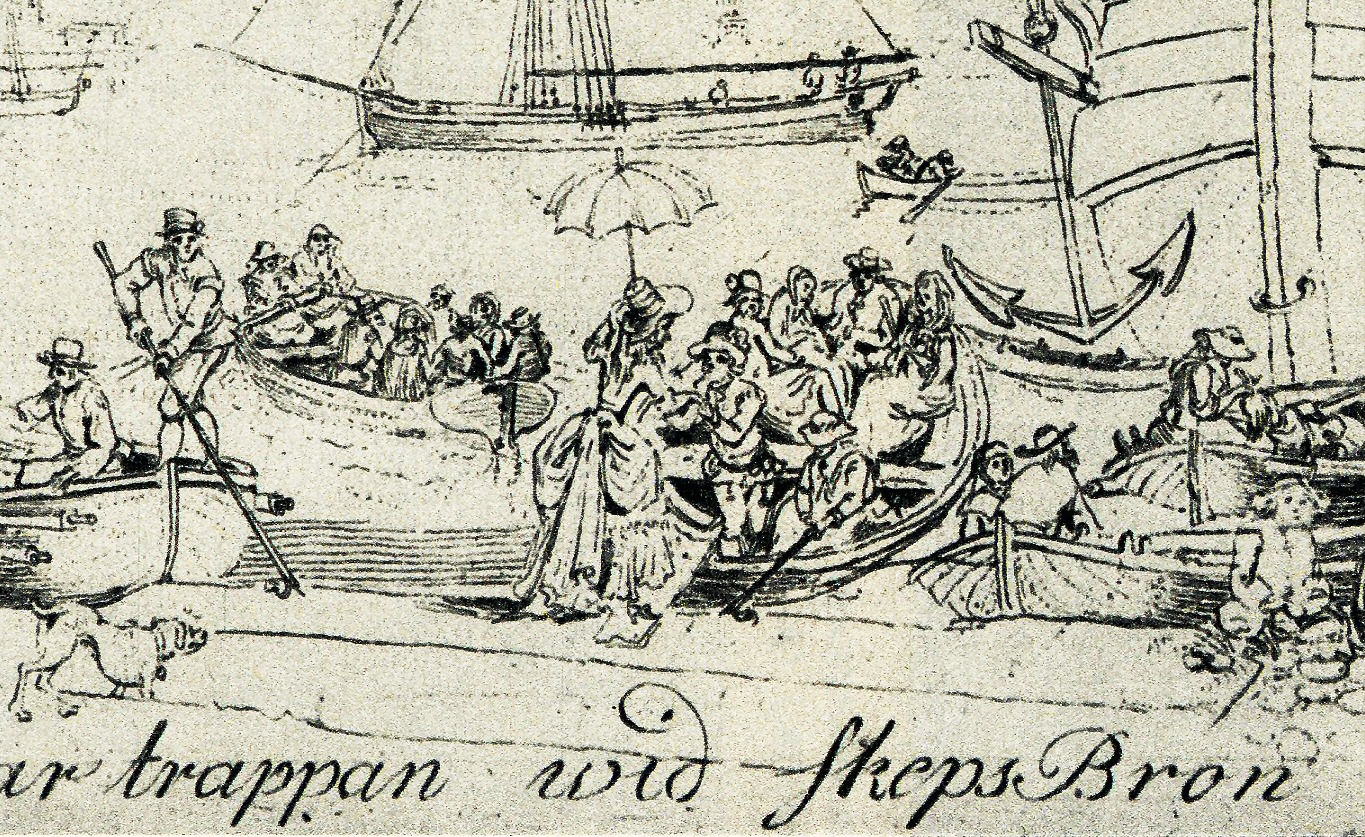
Detail from etching "The steps on Skeppsbro" depicting a scene in Stockholm's harbour by Elias Martin, 1800. The central figure is popularly supposed to represent Ulla Winblad, the bawdy non-mythological heroine of Epistle 28.

The song is dated 17 August 1771. The epistle is subtitled "Om et anstäldt försåt emot Ulla Winblad" ("About an attempted ambush of Ulla Winblad"), which Bellman's biographer Lars Lönnroth describes as relatively vague, compared for instance to that of epistle 31, which gives exact co-ordinates in time and space. The story is at least loosely based on a real event, although the real Ulla Winblad, Maria Kristina Kiellström, was neither a prostitute nor a barmaid, and never prosecuted for wearing unauthorised finery in the form of silk dresses.

The first stanza in verse and prose
Carl Michael Bellman, 1790

I går såg jag ditt barn, min Fröja,
I Yxsmedsgränd,
Klädd i en svart garnerad tröja,
Så snörd och spänd;
En kullrig vidd af många stubbar,
Bjäfs och granlåt och flärd.
Men i dess fjät såg jag två gubbar
Med långa svärd.

Prose translation

Yesterday I saw thy child, my Freya,
On Yxsmeds Alley,
Dressed in a black trimmed top,
So laced and tight;
A hilly place with many stumps,
Finery and show and frivolity.
But behind her I saw two men
With long swords.

Paul Britten Austin's verse, 1977

Yestre'en thy child I saw, my goddess
In Yxsmed Street,
Clad in a black embroider'd bodice,
So trim and neat.
Petticoats flounced their frills and laces,
All in spite of the laws;
Aye, and two wights went in her traces
With long drawn swords.

== Reception ==
Bellman's biographer, Paul Britten Austin, describes the Epistle as rococo, along with No. 25: Blåsen nu alla (All blow now). In it, Ulla Winblad, "a luxuriant Venus, incarnation of love and beauty" is almost caught by the bailiffs in Yxsmedsgränd, a narrow street in Stockholm's Gamla stan, where Bellman himself lived from 1770 to 1774. Carina Burman, in her biography of Bellman, wonders whether Bellman found it slightly amusing to move into the street where the bailiffs had pursued Ulla sixteen years earlier. The epistle describes how she just manages to escape. Bellman simultaneously uses classical and contemporary imagery. He calls Ulla a nymph; she has been given a "myrtle" (crown of leaves) by Freya, the Nordic goddess of love; the Bonde Palace (visible from the corner of Yxsmedsgränd) is called the temple of Themis, classical goddess of justice; and Freya is to be worshipped in Paphos' land, equating her with Venus/Aphrodite. Paphos in Cyprus was where, in the myth, Aphrodite rose naked from the foaming sea, and her temple is nearby. But, non-mythologically, Ulla wears "a black embroider'd bodice" and petticoats with "frills and laces", and she loses her watch in the struggle. Britten Austin translates the entire Epistle.

Burman notes that the cheerful last stanza of the Epistle was one of the Bellman songs used in 19th century student celebrations. Epistle 28 has been recorded by Cornelis Vreeswijk, a noted Bellman interpreter, on his 1971 studio album Spring mot Ulla, spring! Cornelis sjunger Bellman, among others.

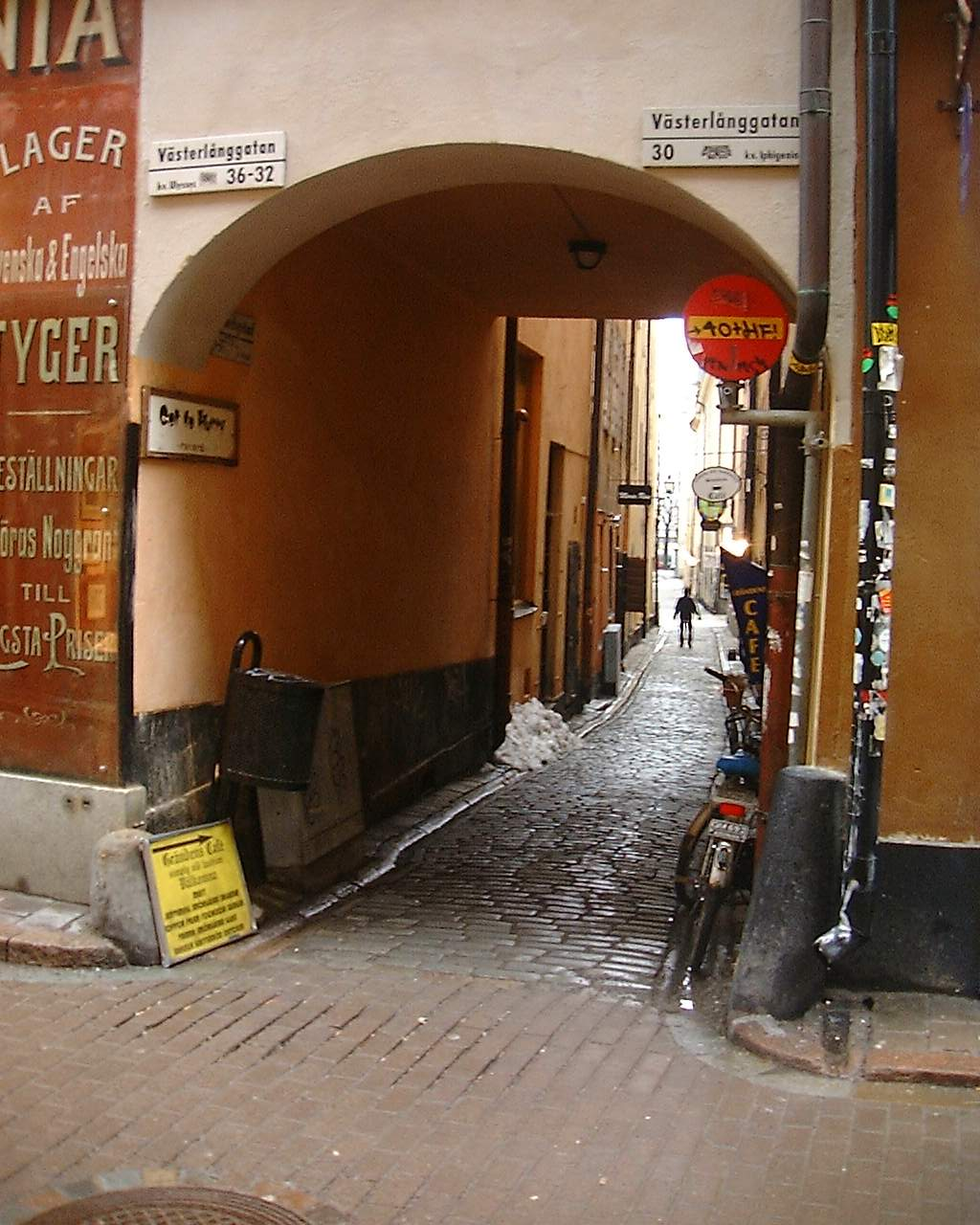
Epistle 28 is set in Yxsmedsgränd, an alley in Stockholm's Gamla stan.

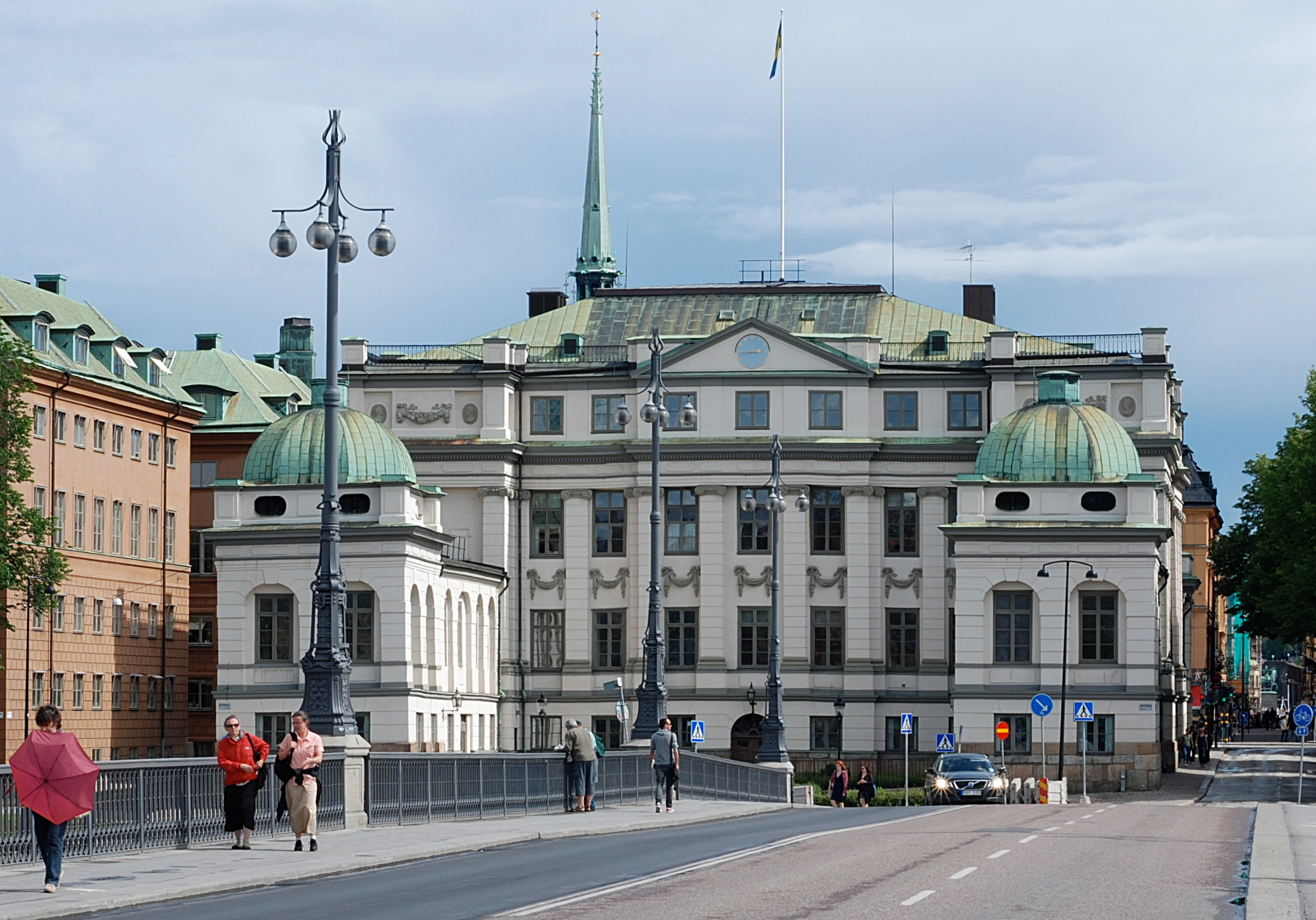
The Bonde Palace, visible from Yxsmedsgränd, is described as the temple of Themis.

== Sources ==
- Bellman, Carl Michael (1790). Fredmans epistlar. Stockholm: By Royal Privilege.
- Britten Austin, Paul (1967). The Life and Songs of Carl Michael Bellman: Genius of the Swedish Rococo. New York: Allhem, Malmö American-Scandinavian Foundation. ISBN 978-3-932759-00-0.
- Britten Austin, Paul (1977). Fredman's Epistles and Songs. Stockholm: Reuter and Reuter. OCLC 5059758.
- Burman, Carina (2019). Bellman. Biografin [Bellman: The Biography] (in Swedish). Stockholm: Albert Bonniers Förlag. ISBN 978-9100141790.
- Hassler, Göran; Dahl, Peter (illus.) (1989). Bellman – en antologi [Bellman – an anthology]. En bok för alla. ISBN 91-7448-742-6. (contains the most popular Epistles and Songs, in Swedish, with sheet music)
- Kleveland, Åse; Ehrén, Svenolov (illus.) (1984). Fredmans epistlar & sånger [The songs and epistles of Fredman]. Stockholm: Informationsförlaget. ISBN 91-7736-059-1. (with facsimiles of sheet music from first editions in 1790, 1791)
- Lönnroth, Lars (2005). Ljuva karneval! : om Carl Michael Bellmans diktning [Lovely Carnival! : about Carl Michael Bellman's Verse]. Stockholm: Albert Bonniers Förlag. ISBN 978-91-0-057245-7. OCLC 61881374.
- Massengale, James Rhea (1979). The Musical-Poetic Method of Carl Michael Bellman. Stockholm: Almqvist & Wiksell International. ISBN 91-554-0849-4.
- Matz, Edward (2004). Carl Michael Bellman: Nymfer och friska kalas [Carl Michael Bellman: Nymphs and Lively Parties] (in Swedish). Svenska Historiska Media Förlag. ISBN 978-91-7545-480-1.
