= Fader Berg i hornet stöter =

18th century Swedish song

- Art song
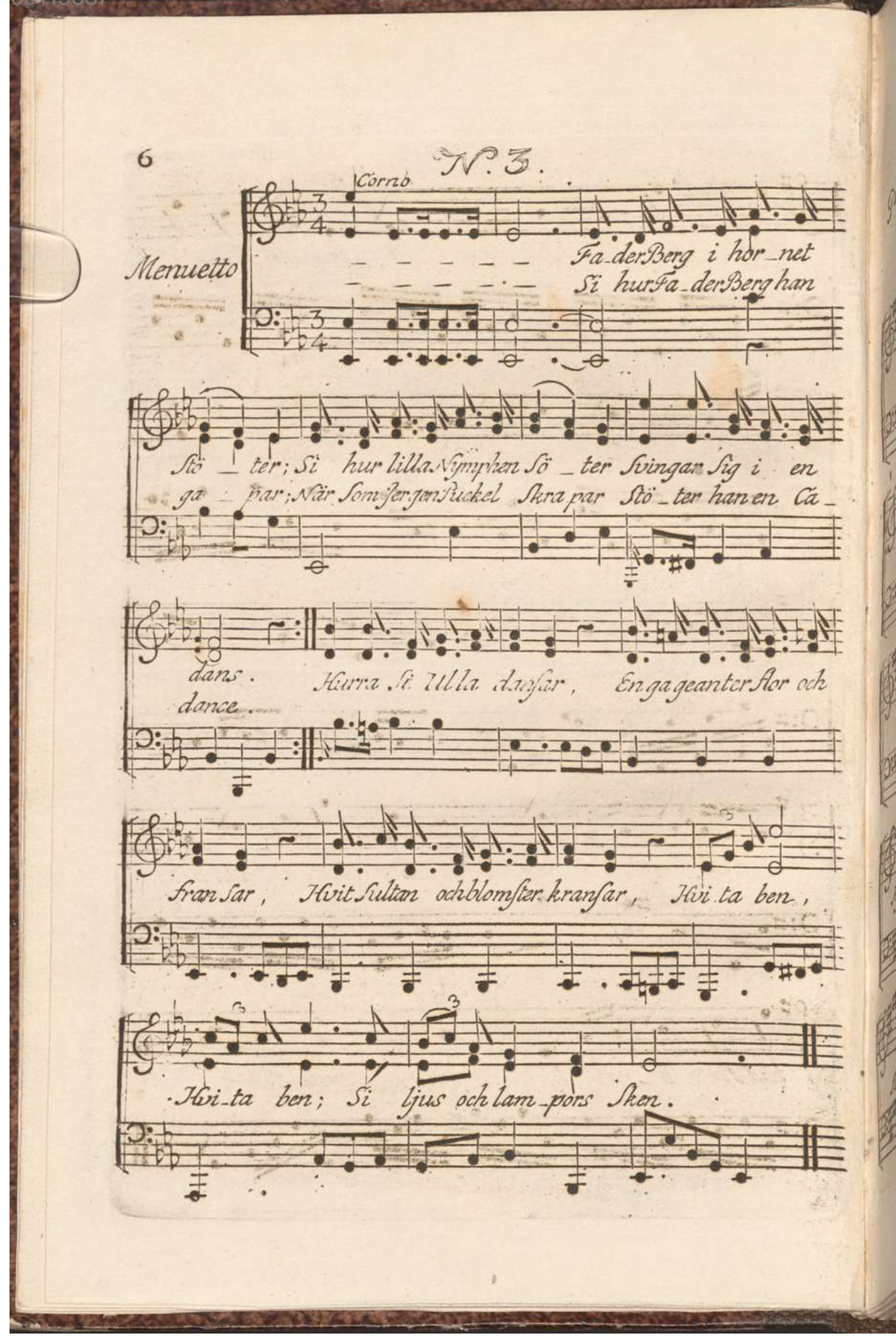
- First page of sheet music for the 1810 edition
- English: Father Berg blows his horn
- Written: March–May 1770
- Text: poem by Carl Michael Bellman
- Language: Swedish
- Melody: An unidentified minuet
- Dedication: The sisters, and Ulla Winblad
- Published: 1790 in Fredman's Epistles
- Scoring: voice, cittern, and horn

Fader Berg i hornet stöter (Father Berg blows his horn) is Epistle No. 3 in the Swedish poet and performer Carl Michael Bellman's 1790 song collection, Fredman's Epistles. The epistle is subtitled "Till en och var av systrarna, men enkannerligen till Ulla Winblad" (To each and every one of the sisters, most especially to Ulla Winblad). One of his best-known works, it is both about and mimics the rhythm of playing the horn, while Fredman enjoys the sight of Ulla Winblad dancing in a ruffled dress.

== Background ==
Carl Michael Bellman is a central figure in the Swedish ballad tradition and a powerful influence in Swedish music, known for his 1790 Fredman's Epistles and his 1791 Fredman's Songs. A solo entertainer, he played the cittern, accompanying himself as he performed his songs at the royal court.

Jean Fredman (1712 or 1713–1767) was a real watchmaker of Bellman's Stockholm. The fictional Fredman, alive after 1767, but without employment, is the supposed narrator in Bellman's epistles and songs. The epistles, written and performed in different styles, from drinking songs and laments to pastorales, paint a complex picture of the life of the city during the 18th century. A frequent theme is the demimonde, with Fredman's cheerfully drunk Order of Bacchus, a loose company of ragged men who favour strong drink and prostitutes. At the same time as depicting this realist side of life, Bellman creates a rococo picture, full of classical allusion, following the French post-Baroque poets. The women, including the beautiful Ulla Winblad, are "nymphs", while Neptune's festive troop of followers and sea-creatures sport in Stockholm's waters. The juxtaposition of elegant and low life is humorous, sometimes burlesque, but always graceful and sympathetic. The songs are "most ingeniously" set to their music, which is nearly always borrowed and skilfully adapted.

== Epistle ==
=== Music and verse form ===
Melody of Epistle 3

The song has four stanzas, each of 11 lines, with a corno (horn) interlude before the first and fourth lines. It is in 3/4 time, marked Menuetto. The rhyming pattern is AABCCB-DDDEE.

The source of the melody is an unknown minuet; Epistle 4's melody can be seen from an early manuscript to be from the same source. Bellman.net states that a possible source melody is a minuet in a contemporary Danish musicians' book, but if so, Bellman's melody is so different that he is at least in part its composer.

=== Lyrics ===
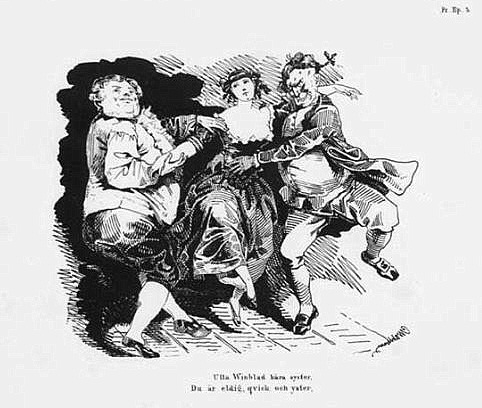
"Ulla Winblad kära syster. Du är eldig, qvick och yster..." ("Ulla Winblad, beloved sister. You are fiery, quick and frisky...") Fredmans Epistle No. 3. Lithograph illustration by Carl Wahlbom, before 1858

The epistle is one of the first that Bellman wrote, between March and May 1770; it introduces Ulla Winblad to the world. The lyrics portray and mimic the rhythm of playing the horn, while Fredman enjoys the sight of Ulla dancing in her ruffled dress. Bellman's biographer, Paul Britten Austin, writes that it perfectly captures the sound of a horn with its minuet melody, whereas No. 2's melody "is exactly a fiddler's". He remarks how different the two are "in style, tempo, rhythm, even instrumental tone-colour".

Versions of the second stanza of Epistle No. 3
Carl Michael Bellman, 1770

Corno. - - - Valdthorn bör man ha på Baler,
Strufvor, Nympher och Pocaler;
Stor sak uti Fioln.
Corno. - - - Si hon slänger handen trötter;
Hvita ben och röda fötter;
Si himmelsblåa kjoln.
Hurra! si bröstet jäser,
Minsta veck i kjolen fräser,
Si hur Fader Berg han läser
Noterna. :||:
Hej! kära far blås bra.

Paul Britten Austin, 1977

Corno. - - - Horns we need for these occasions,
Nymphs, and mugs for our potations,
Yea, and a fiddle too.
Corno. - - - Languid Ulla's ev'ry gesture;
Who in stockings white has dress'd her,
And skirt of heav'nly blue?
Hurrah, her bosom swelling!
Silky pleats and ruffles welling!
Hark how ev'ry note he's spelling,
Father Berg! :||:
Ah, bravely blown, mon cher!

== Reception and legacy ==
Carina Burman writes in her biography of Bellman that the epistle illustrates the gently voyeuristic perspective with detailed observation of "white legs" and details of the nymphs' attire that Bellman delights in; the arch-nymph Ulla Winblad is introduced in this Epistle, which is dedicated to her.

Edvard Matz, author of a book about Bellman's women, calls the song "familiar to everyone", writing that it contains the well-known exclamations "Hurra! si Ulla dansar" ("Hooray! See Ulla's dancing") and "Ulla Winblad kära Syster, Du är eldig, qvick och yster, Hvar dag så står du brud." (Ulla Winblad dear sister, You are fiery, quick and frisky, Each day you stand as bride.")

The Epistle has been recorded by Fred Åkerström on his 1969 album Fred sjunger Bellman, where it was the first track.

== Sources ==
- Bellman, Carl Michael (1790). Fredmans epistlar. Stockholm: By Royal Privilege.
- Britten Austin, Paul (1967). The Life and Songs of Carl Michael Bellman: Genius of the Swedish Rococo. New York: Allhem, Malmö American-Scandinavian Foundation. ISBN 978-3-932759-00-0.
- Britten Austin, Paul (1977). Fredman's Epistles and Songs: A Selection in English. Stockholm: Reuter & Reuter. OCLC 186784336.
- Burman, Carina (2019). Bellman. Biografin [Bellman: The Biography] (in Swedish). Stockholm: Albert Bonniers Förlag. ISBN 978-9100141790.
- Hassler, Göran; Dahl, Peter (illus.) (1989). Bellman – en antologi [Bellman – an anthology]. En bok för alla. ISBN 91-7448-742-6. (contains the most popular Epistles and Songs, in Swedish, with sheet music)
- Kleveland, Åse; Ehrén, Svenolov (illus.) (1984). Fredmans epistlar & sånger [The songs and epistles of Fredman]. Stockholm: Informationsförlaget. ISBN 91-7736-059-1. (with facsimiles of sheet music from first editions in 1790, 1791)
- Massengale, James Rhea (1979). The Musical-Poetic Method of Carl Michael Bellman. Stockholm: Almqvist & Wiksell International. ISBN 91-554-0849-4.
- Matz, Edvard (2015). Carl Michael Bellman Nymfer och friska kalas [Carl Michael Bellman: Nymphs and Lively Parties] (in Swedish). Historiska Media. ISBN 978-91-7545-218-0. OCLC 941607965.
