= Maria Kristina Kiellström =

Swedish silk worker

- Born: 15 June 1744; Stockholm
- Died: 20 January 1798; Stockholm
- Occupation(s): Silk worker, alleged prostitute
- Spouse(s): Eric Nordström, Erik Lindståhl

Notes
- Inspiration of Michael Bellman's famous literary character Ulla Winblad

Maria Kristina Kiellström (15 June 1744 – 20 January 1798), known as Maja Stina, was a Swedish silk worker and alleged prostitute, and most famously the fictional demimonde prostitute or Rococo "nymph" Ulla Winblad in the songs called Fredman's Epistles by Sweden's troubadour, Carl Michael Bellman, who made her a major character in his work.

== Biography ==
Kiellström was born into a poor family in what was then the poor area of Ladugårdslandet in Stockholm. Her mother died when she was five years old. Her father, Johan Kiellström, was originally in the artillery, but he was forced to resign from the military because of epilepsy, and supported himself as a street sweeper. Her father remarried a woman by the name Catharina Elisabeth Winblad, and Maja Stina occasionally used her stepmother's name Winblad ("vineleaf").

From the age of fourteen, Kiellström supported herself. Her first work was that of a domestic, but in 1763, she is listed as a silk worker. During the 1760s, she became acquainted with the songwriter and performer Carl Michael Bellman, and they are known to have dined and danced with each other. In 1765, she gave birth to a daughter who died after eight days. The father of the child was Colonel Wilhelm Schmidt from the Swedish nobility in Russian service, who promised to marry her but abandoned her and left for Russia.

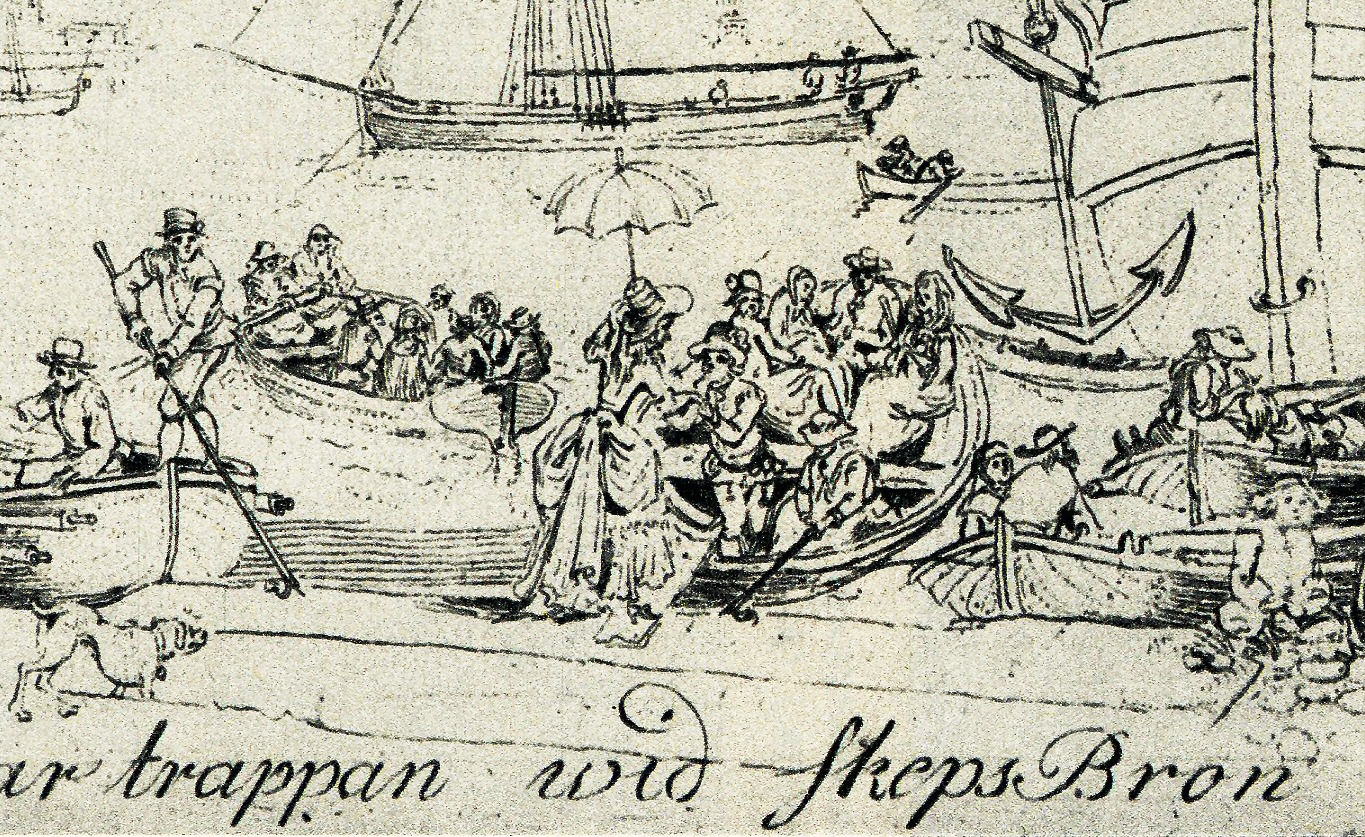
Detail from etching "The steps on Skeppsbro" depicting a scene in Stockholm's harbour by Elias Martin, 1800. The central figure is popularly supposed to be Carl Michael Bellman's semi-mythical Ulla Winblad, based on Kiellström.

During these years, she was alleged to have been a prostitute. Historians, however, have found nothing to confirm this allegation. According to August Gynther, there is no record of her ever having worked at a tavern either. She was on one occasion suspected by her landlord for immoral lifestyle but was by others described as an orderly and dutiful worker. It is confirmed that she regularly took communion in church, something she would likely not have been allowed to do had she been a prostitute. Neither was she ever placed in the Långholmens spinnhus for prostitution. According to historical records, she was only arrested once, and the reason was not prostitution. In 1767, she was arrested for wearing silk, which was normally banned for commoners and laborers under the Sumptuary laws of the time. She was discharged after having proved that she was a silk worker and thereby entitled by law to wear silk despite being a commoner.

In 1772, she married Eric Nordström, a childhood friend of Bellman, who was helped by Bellman to a position at the customs in Norrköping. A figure named Nordström appears in Bellman's Fredman's epistles. Bellman himself had a sinecure job in the customs service. The marriage was unhappy as Nordström treated her badly. She became a widow in 1781, when she moved back to Stockholm, and in 1786, in her middle forties, she married Erik Lindståhl, a man eleven years her junior. She was at this time described as a very well preserved beauty.

== As Ulla Winblad ==
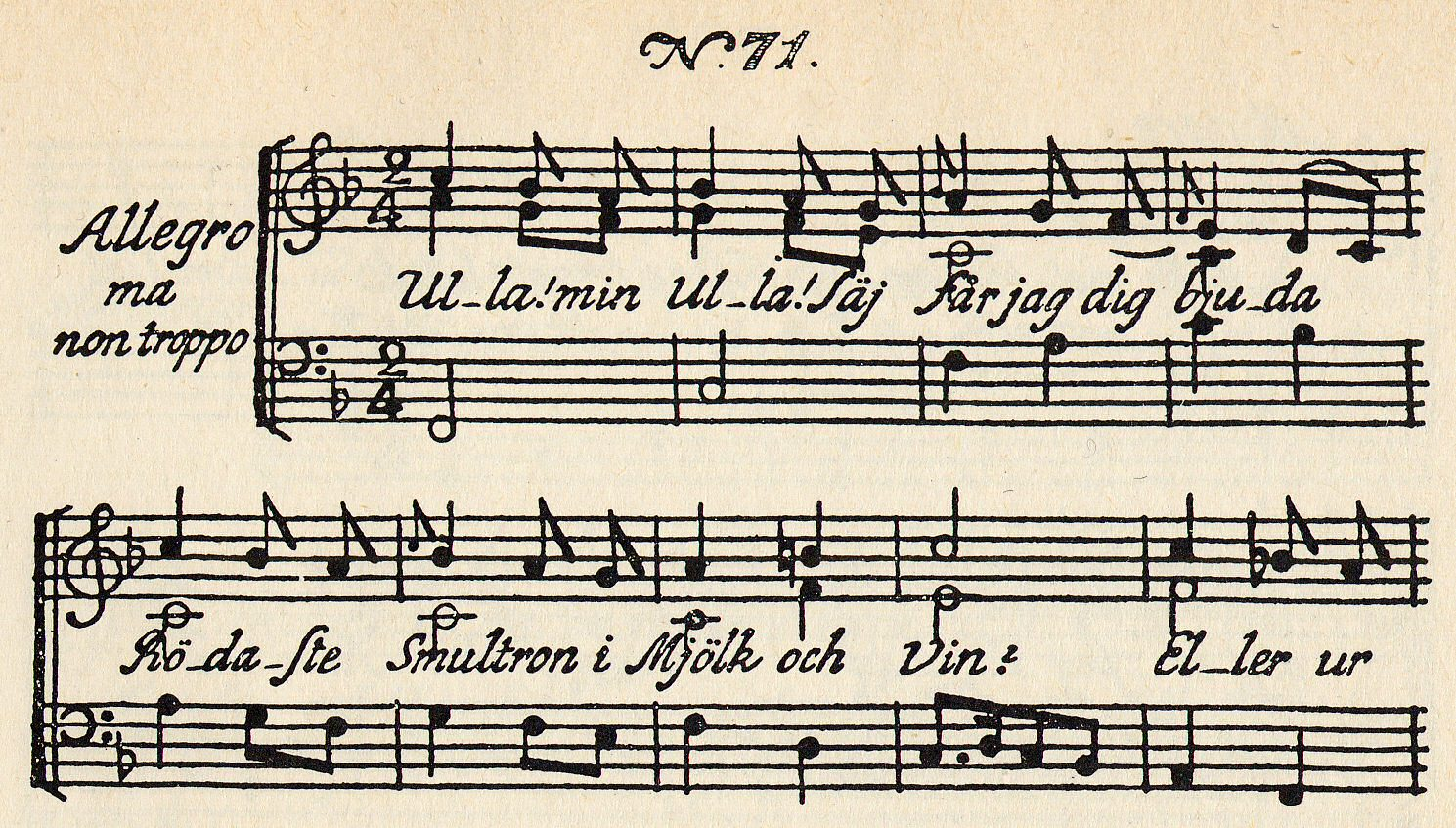
The start of Fredman's Epistle no 71, Ulla, my Ulla, say may I thee offer reddest strawberries in milk and wine..., a song to Ulla Winblad, the mythical demimonde muse based on Kiellström

Kiellström inspired Carl Michael Bellman to create his character, the prostitute "Bar-Nymph", demimonde, and courtesan Ulla Winblad ("Ulla Vine-leaf") who appears in many of the songs in Fredman's epistles. The popular Epistle no. 71 begins:

Ulla! min Ulla! Säj får jag dig bjuda
rödaste smultron i mjölk och vin,...

Ulla, my Ulla, say may I thee offer
reddest strawberries in milk and wine...

It is said that both Kiellström and her husband felt persecuted by Bellman's portrayal of her, and she was exposed to much humiliation because of his songs involving her alter ego. Indeed, another woman who simply had the Christian name "Ulla" found her Stockholm newspaper advertisement ineffective in the 1790s, as her unhappy suitor replied "How can you expect me to marry you when you have such a name?"

== See also ==
- Ulla von Hopken
- Lovisa von Plat

== Sources ==
- Bellman.net om Ulla Winblad och Maija-Stina Kiellström
- Britten Austin, Paul. The Life and Songs of Carl Michael Bellman: Genius of the Swedish Rococo. Allhem, Malmö American-Scandinavian Foundation, New York, 1967. ISBN 978-3-932759-00-0
- Artikel i Dagens Nyheter, 070726.
- Matz, Edvard. Carl Michael Bellman – Nymfer och friskt kalas. Historiska Media, Lund, 2004. ISBN 91-89442-97-0
