= Blåsen nu alla =

Song by the 18th century Swedish bard Carl Michael Bellman

- Art song
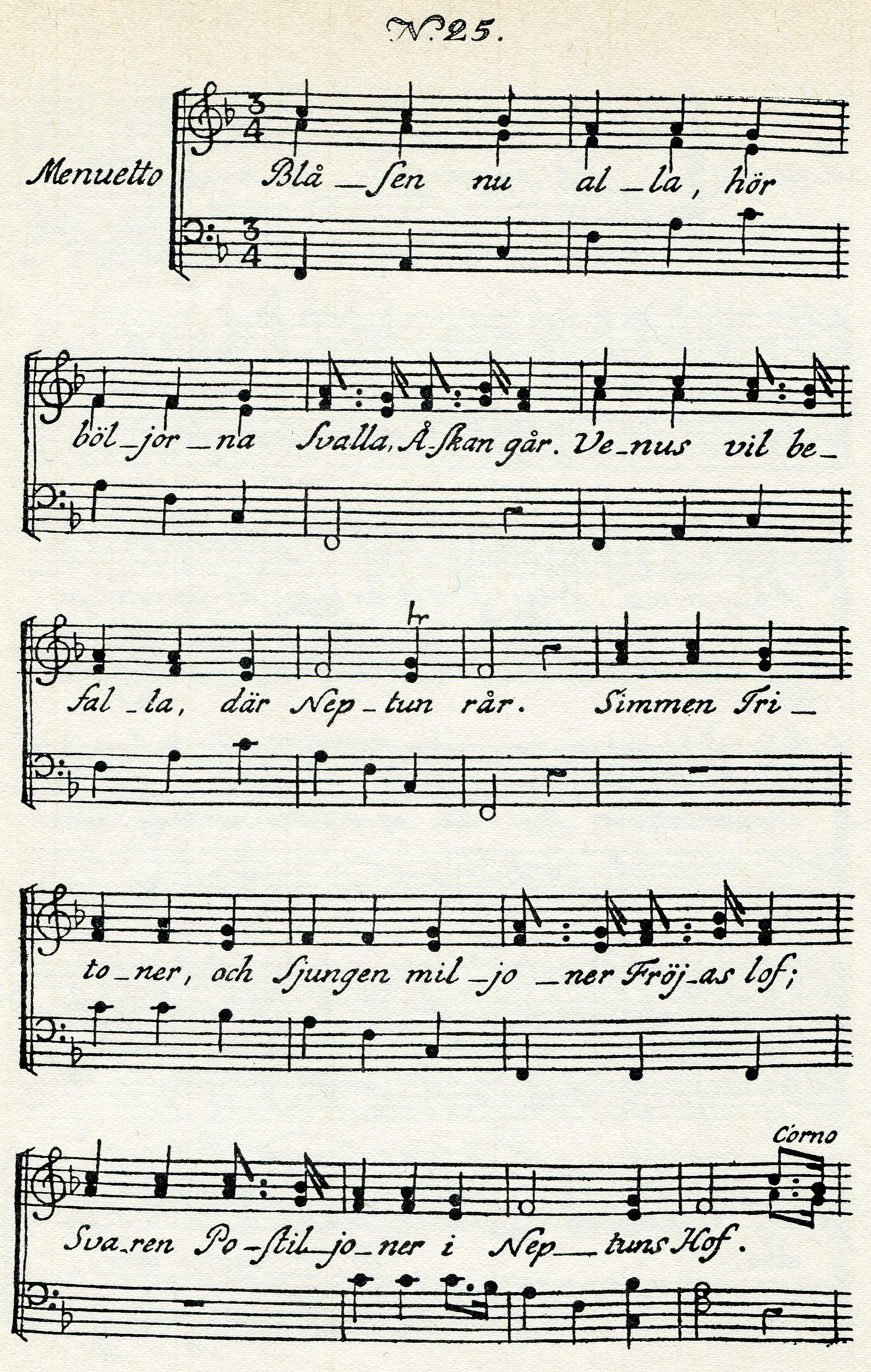
- The first page of sheet music names Venus, Neptune, Tritons, and Fröja, the Nordic goddess of love.
- English: All blow now!
- Written: 1770
- Text: poem by Carl Michael Bellman
- Language: Swedish
- Published: 1790 in Fredman's Epistles
- Scoring: voice and cittern

Blåsen nu alla, "All blow now!", is one of the Swedish poet and performer Carl Michael Bellman's best-known and best-loved songs, from his 1790 collection, Fredman's Epistles, where it is No. 25. It is a pastorale, based on François Boucher's rococo 1740 painting Triumph of Venus.

The epistle is subtitled "Som är ett försök till en pastoral i bacchanalisk smak, skriven vid Ulla Winblads överfart till Djurgården" (Which is an attempt at a pastorale in Bacchanalian taste, written on Ulla Winblad's crossing to Djurgården)

== Context ==
Carl Michael Bellman is a central figure in the Swedish ballad tradition and a powerful influence in Swedish music, known for his 1790 Fredman's Epistles and his 1791 Fredman's Songs. A solo entertainer, he played the cittern, accompanying himself as he performed his songs at the royal court.

Jean Fredman (1712 or 1713–1767) was a real watchmaker of Bellman's Stockholm. The fictional Fredman, alive after 1767, but without employment, is the supposed narrator in Bellman's epistles and songs. The epistles, written and performed in different styles, from drinking songs and laments to pastorales, paint a complex picture of the life of the city during the 18th century. A frequent theme is the demimonde, with Fredman's cheerfully drunk Order of Bacchus, a loose company of ragged men who favour strong drink and prostitutes. At the same time as depicting this realist side of life, Bellman creates a rococo picture, full of classical allusion, following the French post-Baroque poets. The women, including the beautiful Ulla Winblad, are "nymphs", while Neptune's festive troop of followers and sea-creatures sport in Stockholm's waters. The juxtaposition of elegant and low life is humorous, sometimes burlesque, but always graceful and sympathetic. The songs are "most ingeniously" set to their music, which is nearly always borrowed and skilfully adapted.

== Song ==
=== Music and verse form ===
Melody of Epistle 25
A Minuet tune

Blåsen nu alla is a song in eight verses, each of 15 short lines. The rhyming pattern is AABAB-CCDCD-EEEFF. It is in 3/4 time and is marked Menuetto (Minuet). The melody has the timbre "Waldthorns-stycke" but is origin beyond that is unknown; the song was most likely written in the first half of 1770.

=== Lyrics ===
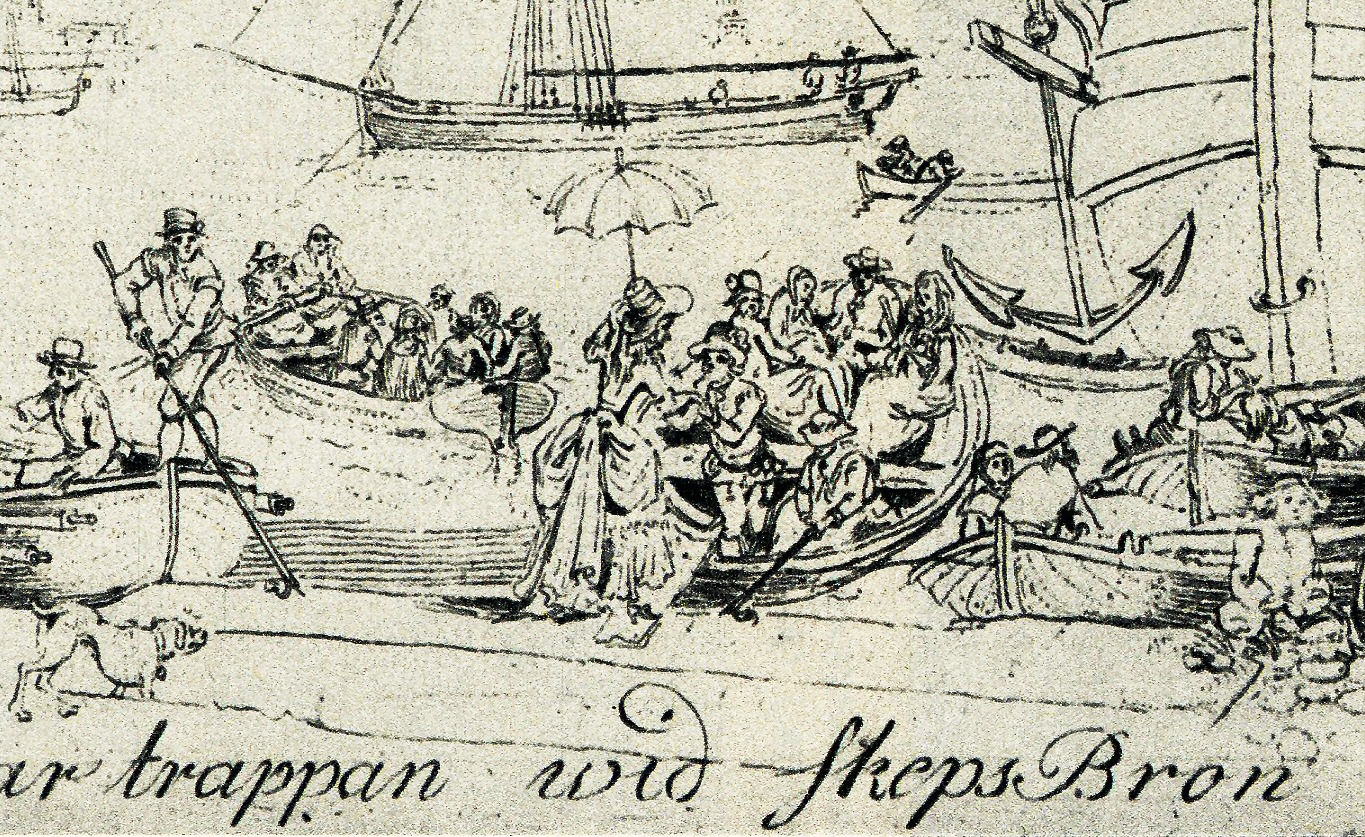
Detail from etching "The steps on Skeppsbro" depicting a scene in Stockholm's harbour by Elias Martin, 1800. The central figure is popularly supposed to represent Ulla Winblad, the bawdy non-mythological heroine of Epistle 25.

The song, which Bellman called "his Epistle", begins with a rococo theme, with the classical goddess Venus crossing the water, as in François Boucher's Triumph of Venus, but the waterway is Stockholm's harbour, and when the goddess disembarks, Bellman transforms her into a lustful Ulla Winblad. In his time, the painting hung in Drottningholm Palace.

Versions of Epistle 25, verse 1
Carl Michael Bellman, 1790	Prose translation	Hendrik Willem Van Loon, 1939 "Ulla's Trip to the Deer-park"
Blåsen nu alla, Hör böljorna svalla, Åskan går. Venus vil befalla, Där Neptun rår. Simmen Tritoner, Och sjungen miljoner Fröjas lof; Svaren Postiljoner; I Neptuns hof. - - - - - - - - - Corno; Se Venus i sin pragt, Kring hänne hålla vakt Änglar, Delphiner, Zephirer och Paphos hela magt; Vattu-Nympher plaska kring I Ring. - - - - - - - - - - - - - - Corno	All blow now, Hear the waves swell, Thunder booms. Venus will command, Where Neptune reigns. Tritons swim, And millions sing, Freya's praise; Postillions reply In Neptune's court. See Venus in her splendour, Around her keep watch Angels, dolphins, zephyrs, and all Paphos' might; Water-Nymphs splash around In a ring.	Blow one and all Hear the thunder's call, and the surging sea; Neptune rules, but Venus the Queen shall be. Freja we praise too, Our voices in joy we raise anew, Tritons, hark! the bugle's plea Love pursue. See Venus, beaut'ous sight, Guarded by day and night, By angels, dolphins, zephyrs And all of Paphos' holy, sacred might. Water nymphs are gay they sing and play.

The Epistle was planned as the grand finale to Bellman's planned initial collection of 25 Epistles, the grandiose assembly of figures from classical mythology contrasting with the reality of a boat crossing.

== Reception ==
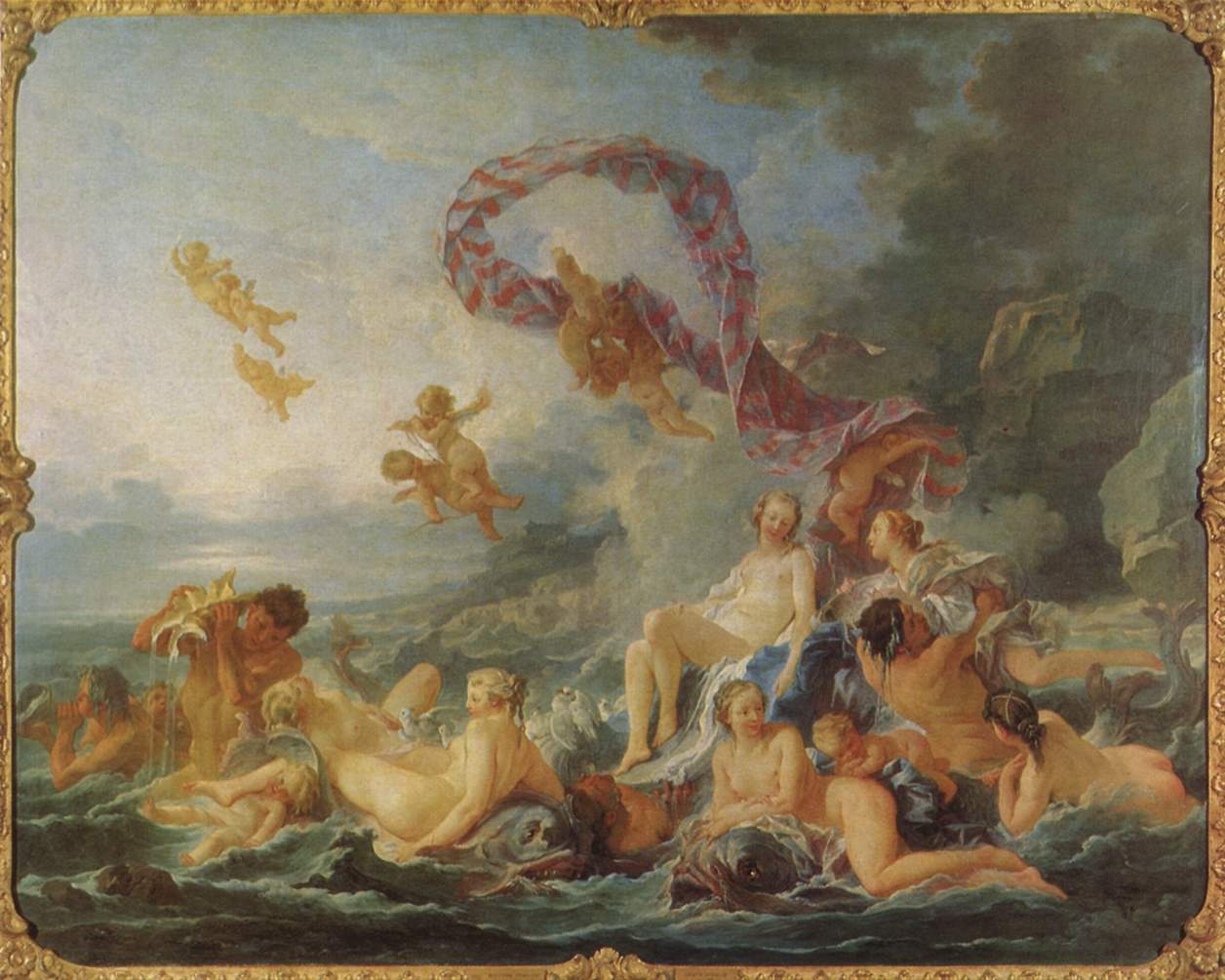
François Boucher's 1740 painting Triumph of Venus, the model for Epistle 25, "All blow now!", where Bellman humorously contrasts rococo classical allusions with bawdy remarks

The scholar of literature Lars Lönnroth writes that Bellman transformed song genres including elegy and pastorales into social reportage, and that he achieved this also in his two Bacchanalian lake-journeys, epistles 25 and 48 ("Solen glimmar blank och trind"). The two are, he notes, extremely unlike in style, in narrative technique, and in Fredman's role in the description. Whereas epistle 25 portrays Ulla Winblad as the goddess Venus, and speaks of Neptune's court with classical mythological appurtenances like zephyrs, water-nymphs, and "all the might of Paphos" (the birthplace of Venus), epistle 48 is naturalistic.

The song has been recorded by Sven-Bertil Taube and Mikael Samuelsson (Sjunger Fredmans Epistlar, Polydor, 1990) among others.

== Sources ==
- Bellman, Carl Michael (1790). Fredmans epistlar. Stockholm: By Royal Privilege.
- Britten Austin, Paul (1967). The Life and Songs of Carl Michael Bellman: Genius of the Swedish Rococo. New York: Allhem, Malmö American-Scandinavian Foundation. ISBN 978-3-932759-00-0.
- Hassler, Göran; Dahl, Peter (illus.) (1989). Bellman – en antologi [Bellman – an anthology]. En bok för alla. ISBN 91-7448-742-6. (contains the most popular Epistles and Songs, in Swedish, with sheet music)
- Hägg, Göran (1996). Den svenska litteraturhistorien [The Swedish literature history]. Stockholm: Wahlström & Widstrand. ISBN 91-46-17629-2.
- Kleveland, Åse; Ehrén, Svenolov (illus.) (1984). Fredmans epistlar & sånger [The songs and epistles of Fredman]. Stockholm: Informationsförlaget. ISBN 91-7736-059-1. (with facsimiles of sheet music from first editions in 1790, 1791)
- Lönnroth, Lars (2005). Ljuva karneval! : om Carl Michael Bellmans diktning [Lovely Carnival! : about Carl Michael Bellman's Verse]. Stockholm: Albert Bonniers Förlag. ISBN 978-91-0-057245-7. OCLC 61881374.
- Massengale, James Rhea (1979). The Musical-Poetic Method of Carl Michael Bellman. Stockholm: Almqvist & Wiksell International. ISBN 91-554-0849-4.
- Van Loon, Hendrik Willem; Castagnetta, Grace (1939). The Last of the Troubadours. New York: Simon and Schuster.
