= Tjenare Mollberg, hur är det fatt? =

Song by the 18th century Swedish bard Carl Michael Bellman

- Art song
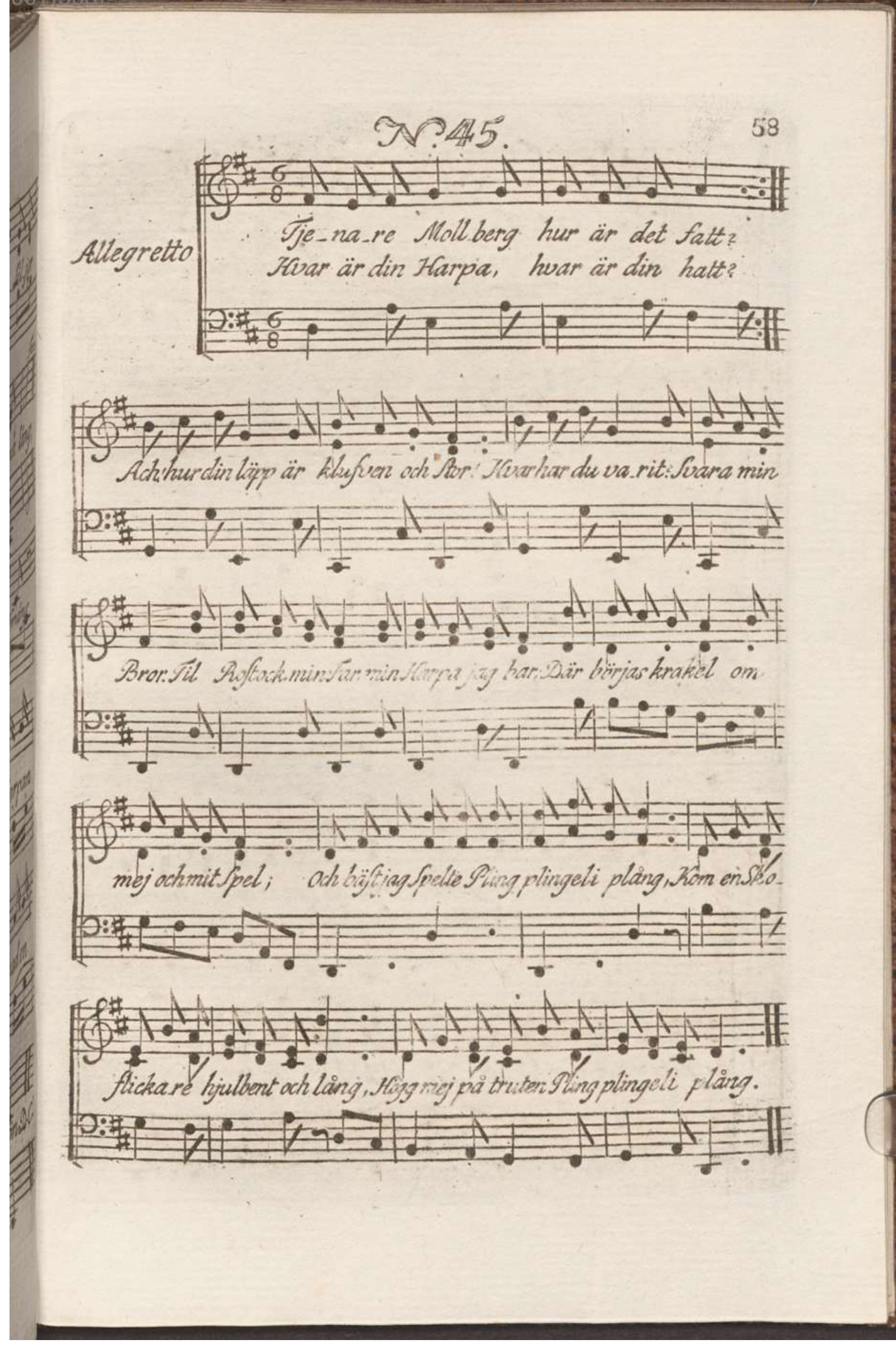
- First page of sheet music, 1810 edition
- English: Dear Mollberg, what happened?
- Written: between 1773 and 1778
- Text: poem by Carl Michael Bellman
- Language: Swedish
- Melody: from Silvain
- Composed: 1770
- Published: 1790 in Fredman's Epistles
- Scoring: voice and cittern

Tjenare Mollberg, hur är det fatt? (Dear Mollberg, what happened?) is No. 45 in the Swedish poet and performer Carl Michael Bellman's 1790 song collection, Fredman's Epistles. The epistle is subtitled "Till fader Mollberg rörande hans harpa, och tillika et slags ad notitiam at Mollberg led oskyldigt på Krogen Rostock" (To father Mollberg concerning his harp, and further a sort of ad notitiam that Mollberg innocently suffered at the Rostock tavern); the song is sometimes known under this name. It describes a fight in a tavern that starts when Mollberg innocently plays a Polska on his harp, leading his audience to assume it was propaganda for Poland.

Scholars have noted that the epistle is the clearest exception to the rule that Bellman avoided international politics. The Rostock tavern's location has been debated; the evidence favours a city centre site in Stockholm's Gamla stan. The sound of Mollberg's harp is indicated in the song with onomatopoeic phrases.

== Context ==
Carl Michael Bellman is a central figure in the Swedish ballad tradition and a powerful influence in Swedish music, known for his 1790 Fredman's Epistles and his 1791 Fredman's Songs. A solo entertainer, he played the cittern, accompanying himself as he performed his songs at the royal court.

Jean Fredman (1712 or 1713–1767) was a real watchmaker of Bellman's Stockholm. The fictional Fredman, alive after 1767, but without employment, is the supposed narrator in Bellman's epistles and songs. The epistles, written and performed in different styles, from drinking songs and laments to pastorales, paint a complex picture of the life of the city during the 18th century. A frequent theme is the demimonde, with Fredman's cheerfully drunk Order of Bacchus, a loose company of ragged men who favour strong drink and prostitutes. At the same time as depicting this realist side of life, Bellman creates a rococo picture, full of classical allusion, following the French post-Baroque poets. The women, including the beautiful Ulla Winblad, are "nymphs", while Neptune's festive troop of followers and sea-creatures sport in Stockholm's waters. The juxtaposition of elegant and low life is humorous, sometimes burlesque, but always graceful and sympathetic. The songs are "most ingeniously" set to their music, which is nearly always borrowed and skilfully adapted.

== Song ==
=== Music and verse form ===
Melody of epistle 45
The allegretto tune from Silvain

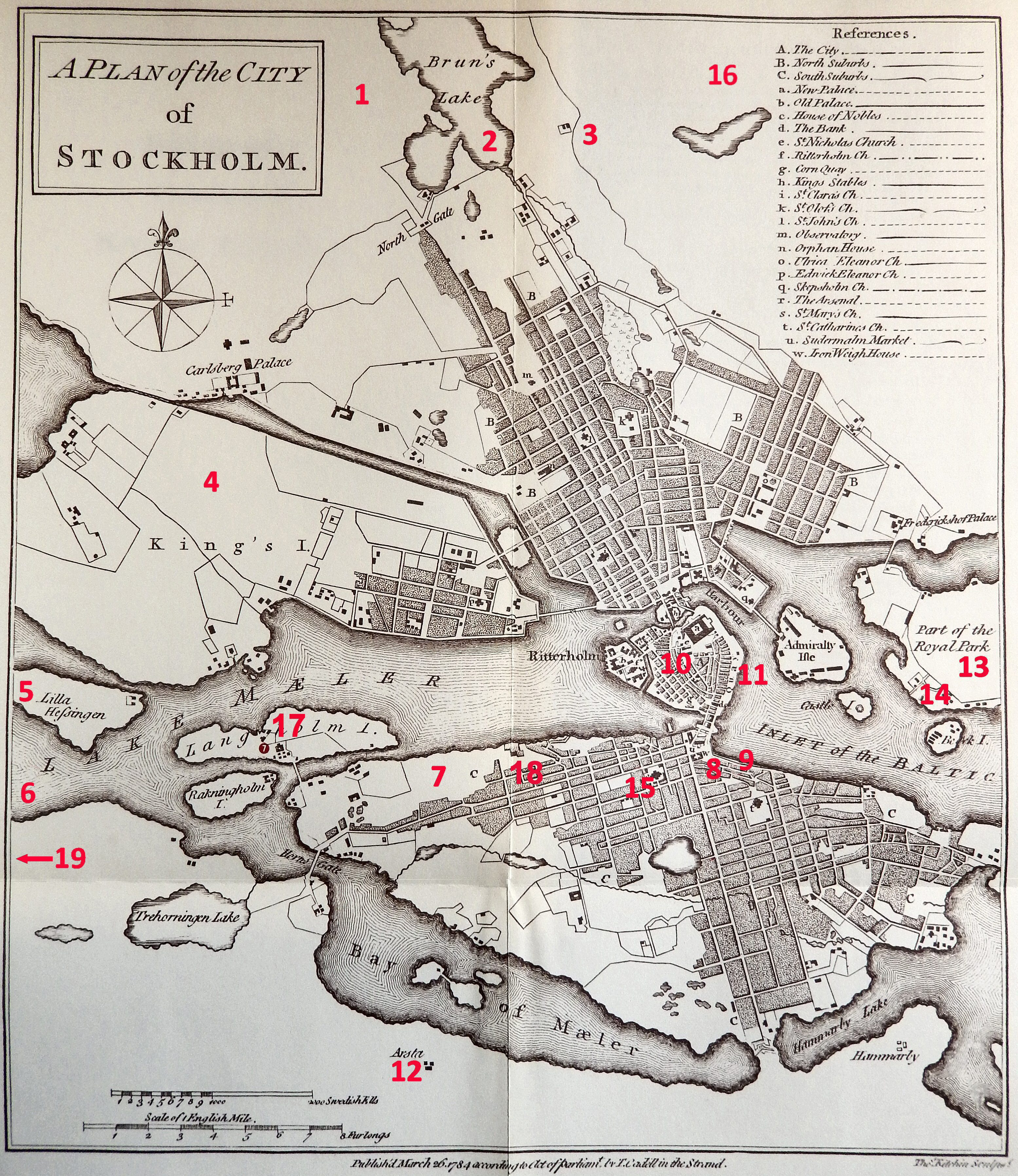
Map of Bellman's Stockholm, places of interest for his Fredman's Epistles and Songs on map from William Coxe's Travels into Poland, Russia, Sweden, and Denmark, 1784. 1 Haga park (S. 64) – 2 Brunnsviken – 3 Första Torpet (Ep. 80) – 4 Kungsholmen – 5 Hessingen (Ep. 48) – 6 Lake Mälaren (Ep. 48) – 7 Södermalm – 8 Urvädersgränd – 9 Lokatten tavern (Ep. 11, Ep. 59, Ep. 77), Bruna Dörren tavern (Ep. 24, Ep. 38) – 10 Gamla stan (Ep. 5, Ep. 9, Ep. 23, Ep. 28, Ep. 79) – 11 Skeppsbron Quay (Ep. 33) – 12 Årsta Castle – 13 Djurgården Park – (Ep. 25, Ep. 51, Ep. 82) – 14 Gröna Lund (Ep. 12, Ep. 62) – 15 Bellman's birthplace – 16 Fiskartorpet (Ep. 71) – 17 Lilla Sjötullen (Bellmanmuseet) (Ep. 48) – 18 Bensvarvars tavern (Ep. 40) 19 Rostock tavern (Ep. 45)

The song has 9 verses, each consisting of 11 lines: 4 long, 4 short, 3 long. The rhyming pattern is AABB-CCDD-EEE. It is marked Allegretto, and is in 6/8 time. The melody is an ariette from the comic opera Silvain with libretto by Jean-François Marmontel and music by André Grétry. This was first put on in Paris in 1770, and the French performers brought it to Stockholm's Bollhus Theatre that same year. The musicologist James Massengale writes that the "poetic possibility" was for Bellman to set up a humorous contrast between the melody and the reality described in the epistle.

=== Lyrics ===
The epistle was written sometime between 1773 and 1778. The song, subtitled "Till fader Mollberg rörande hans harpa" (To father Mollberg concerning his harp), tells how the musician Mollberg, a member of Fredman's Order of Bacchus, had gone to the Rostock tavern to play "Drottningens polska i Polen, G dur" (The Queen of Poland's Polska in G major); the lyrics include onomatopoeic phrases suggestive of the plucking of harp strings. A shoe-mender tells him not to allude to "Polens affärer" (Poland's affairs). He explains to "my Maecenas", he drinks and talks "helt högt" (out loud) about Poland, and how no monarch can forbid him from playing his harp, as long as he has a string left. Two notaries, an old sergeant, and a dragoon guardsman call out to Mollberg to stop. A "cross-eyed" woman steps up and smashes his harp, bottles and glass. The shoe-mender hits Mollberg, and the epistle ends with a lament for the world's injustice and his innocent suffering; he vows to keep better company, and to "play for Bacchus [god of wine] and Venus [goddess of love] — kling klang — ", and asks Apollo [god of music] to accompany him, "Pling, plingeli plang!".

The start of epistle 45, "To father Mollberg concerning his harp"
Carl Michael Bellman, 1790

Tjenare Mollberg, hur är det fatt?
Hvar är din Harpa? hvar är din hatt?
Ach! hur din läpp är klufven och stor!
Hvar har du varit? svara min Bror.
Til Rostock, min Far,
Min harpa jag bar;
Där börjas krakel,
Om mej och mit spel;
Och bäst jag spelte, Pling plingeli plång,
Kom en Skoflickare hjulbent och lång,
Högg mig på truten. Pling plingeli plång.

Prose translation

Dear Mollberg, what happened?
Where's your harp? Where's your hat?
Oh! your lip is so swollen and split!
Where have you been? Answer, my brother.
To Rostock [tavern], my friend,
My harp I carried;
There the fuss began,
About me and my playing.
And while I played my best, Pling plingeli plong,
Came a shoe-mender, tall and bandy-legged,
Hit me in the mouth. Pling plingeli plong.

== Reception and legacy ==
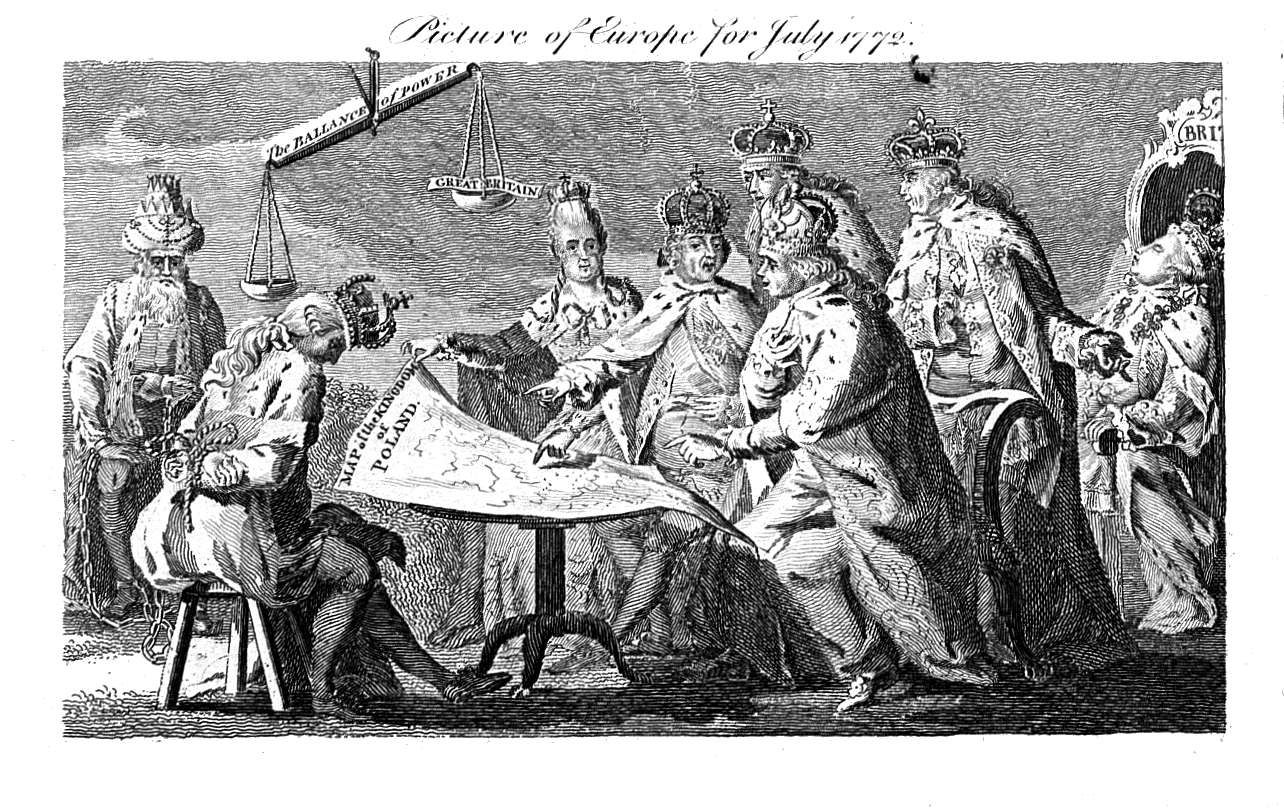
Cartoon of the First Partition of Poland, July 1772. Catherine the Great of Russia, Frederick II of Prussia and Joseph II of Austria agree to divide Poland with the tacit consent of Sultan Mustafa III; King George III of Britain is pushed to the background. In this context, Mollberg's playing of a Polska is taken as a political statement.

Britten Austin calls the song a "famous ballad-epistle". The harpist Mollberg innocently plays a dance tune, which as the lyrics state is the "Queen of Poland, her Polska, in G Major". Britten Austin explains that this is "an action which is instantly assumed by a shoemaker, a sergeant, two notaries and a guardsman to have political innuendo". Mollberg replies that no monarch in the world can stop him playing; the result is that "his face is smashed in, and his harp, too". Britten Austin notes that Mollberg is accustomed to "rough nights" of this kind, as epistle 41 describes a morning after as Mollberg gets up "rubbing his bruises", while epistle 58 tells how a fellow member of the Order of Bacchus, Kilberg, meets his death in a tavern brawl, "His glass upset; / Beer from a barrel is dripping."

The Bellman Society comments that while international politics rarely inspired Bellman to song, this epistle is the clearest exception. Poland had been divided up by the great powers of the Russian Empire, Prussia, and Austria; Mollberg's choice of a Polska was interpreted by the tavern guests as "propaganda for Poland". The Society states that Mollberg's complaint represents one of the first calls for freedom of expression in Swedish literature.

The song was recorded by Fred Åkerström on his third album of Bellman interpretations, Vila vid denna källa in 1977. Åkerström accompanied himself on guitar (where Bellman played his cittern), with Katarina Fritzén on flute and Örjan Larsson on cello. An earlier performance by Sven-Bertil Taube on his Fredmans Epistlar och Sånger, recorded 1959–1963, was re-released on an EMI-Svenska CD in 1983.

The location of the Rostock tavern has been debated. According to the local historian Björn Hasselblad, the incident described in the epistle took place in Stockholm's city centre, at Källaren Rostock at Västerlånggatan 45 in Gamla stan. A different understanding is recorded by Stockholm Municipality's Stockholmskällan database; it states that the lithograph by Elis Chiewitz, illustrating the Epistle, shows the interior of the Rostock lake tavern in Sätra, then to the southwest of Stockholm. This interpretation is corroborated by the Stockholm City Museum's card register for old tavern names, which contains a remark on the card for the Västerlånggatan "Rostock": "Do not confuse this [city centre] Rostock with that in Fredman's ep. 45."

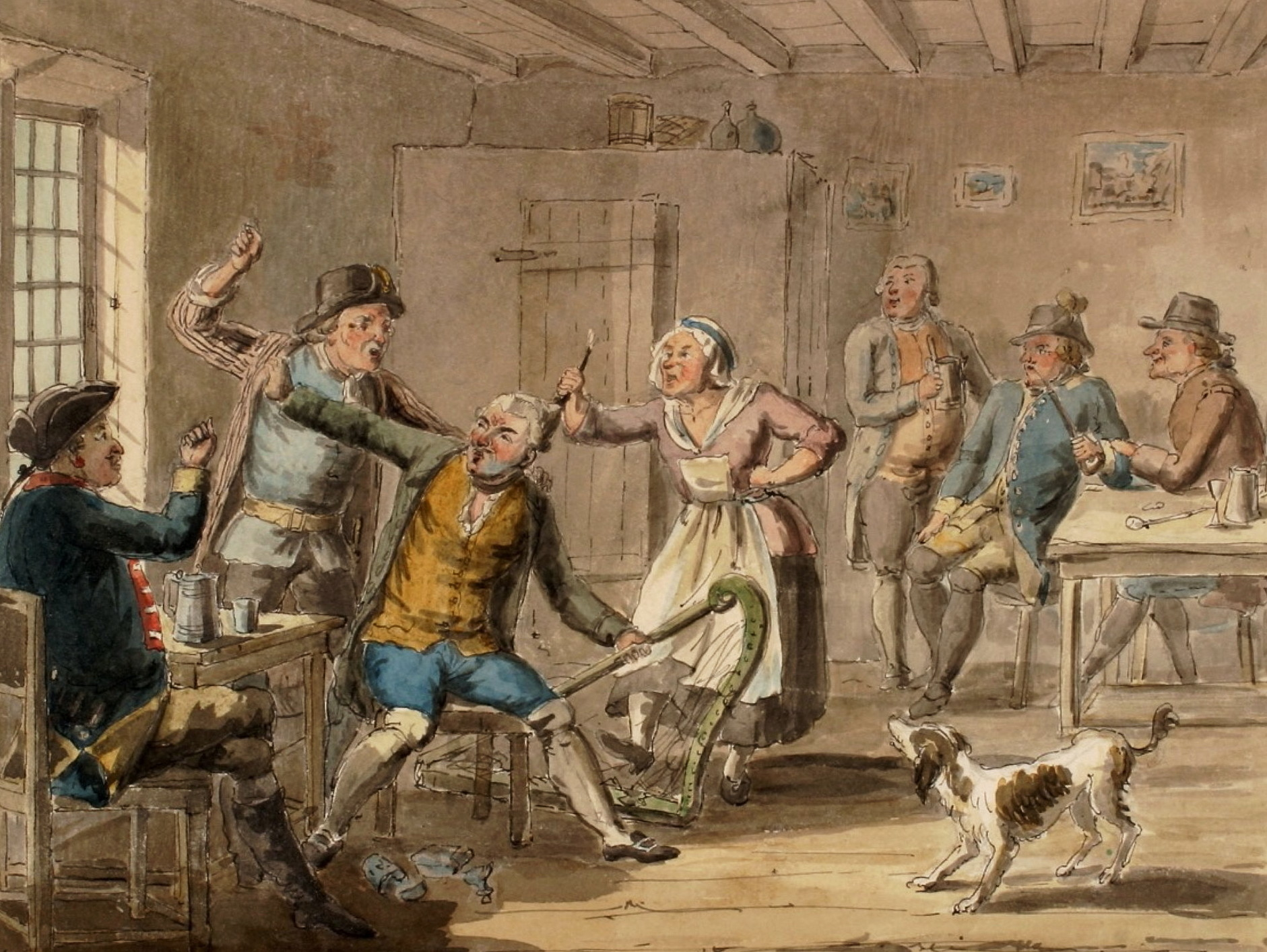
Ep. 45: Mollberg is beaten up in the Rostock tavern. Illustration by Elis Chiewitz, 1826

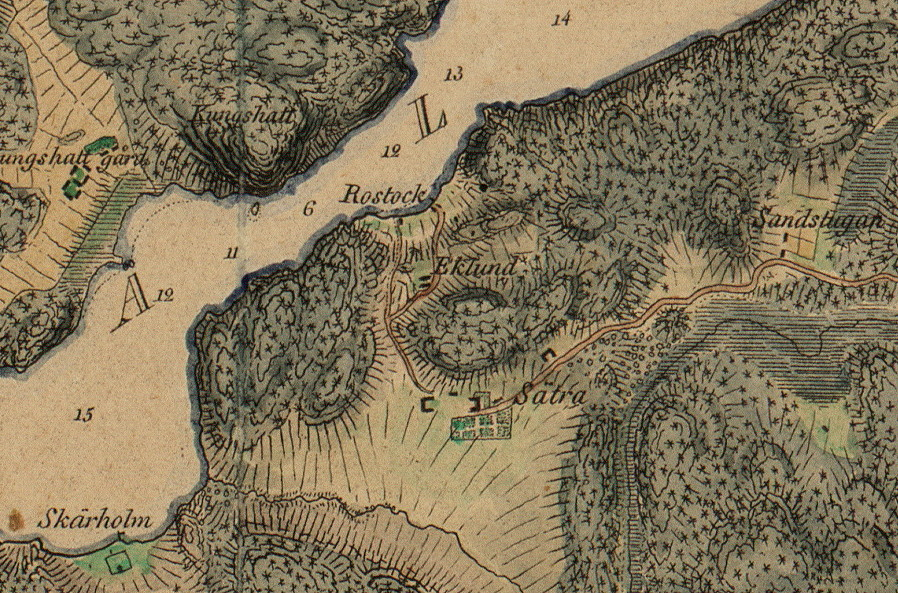
Rostock tavern in Sätra beside Lake Mälaren to the southwest of Stockholm, 1817 map

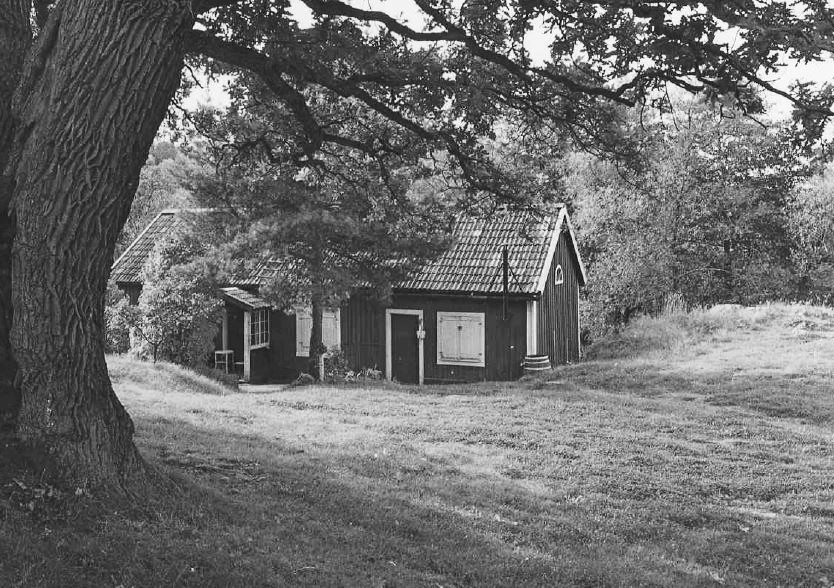
The Rostock tavern building in Sätra, 1962

== Sources ==
- Bellman, Carl Michael (1790). Fredmans epistlar. Stockholm: By Royal Privilege.
- Britten Austin, Paul (1967). The Life and Songs of Carl Michael Bellman: Genius of the Swedish Rococo. New York: Allhem, Malmö American-Scandinavian Foundation. ISBN 978-3-932759-00-0.
- Hassler, Göran; Dahl, Peter (illus.) (1989). Bellman – en antologi [Bellman – an anthology] (in Swedish). En bok för alla. ISBN 91-7448-742-6. (contains the most popular Epistles and Songs, in Swedish, with sheet music)
- Kleveland, Åse; Ehrén, Svenolov (illus.) (1984). Fredmans epistlar & sånger [The songs and epistles of Fredman] (in Swedish). Stockholm: Informationsförlaget. ISBN 91-7736-059-1. (with facsimiles of sheet music from first editions in 1790, 1791)
- Massengale, James Rhea (1979). The Musical-Poetic Method of Carl Michael Bellman. Stockholm: Almqvist & Wiksell International. ISBN 91-554-0849-4.
