= Käraste Bröder Systrar och Vänner =

Song by the 18th century Swedish bard Carl Michael Bellman

"Käraste Bröder, Systrar och Vänner"
- Art song
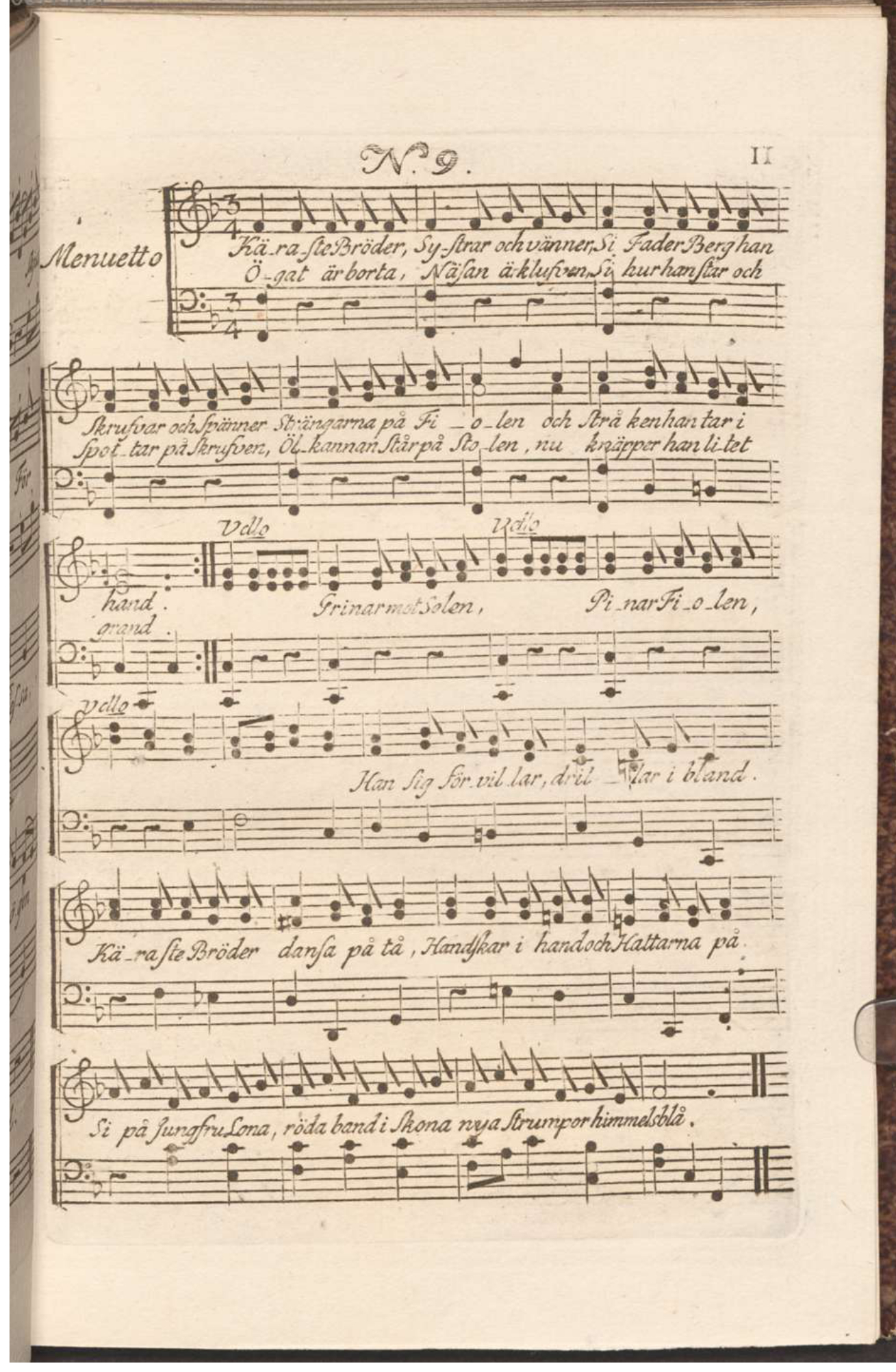
- First page of sheet music, 1810 reprint
- English: Dearest Brothers, Sisters and Friends
- Written: 1770
- Text: poem by Carl Michael Bellman
- Language: Swedish
- Published: 1790 in Fredman's Epistles
- Scoring: voice, cittern, and cello

Käraste Bröder Systrar och Vänner (Dearest Brothers, Sisters and Friends) is Epistle No. 9 in the Swedish poet and performer Carl Michael Bellman's 1790 song collection, Fredman's Epistles. The epistle is subtitled with the dedication "Til Gumman på Thermopolium Boreale och hännes Jungfrur." ("To the old Woman at Thermopolium Boreale and her Maidens"), Barbara Ekenberg. It describes the fictional Jean Fredman's cheerful world of brandy, women, and dance, in the setting of a tavern which is halfway to a brothel. The song ends with Fredman's credo, a celebration of everything that is delightful in life.

== Background ==
Carl Michael Bellman is a central figure in the Swedish ballad tradition and a powerful influence in Swedish music, known for his 1790 Fredman's Epistles and his 1791 Fredman's Songs. A solo entertainer, he played the cittern, accompanying himself as he performed his songs at the royal court.

Jean Fredman (1712 or 1713–1767) was a real watchmaker of Bellman's Stockholm. The fictional Fredman, alive after 1767, but without employment, is the supposed narrator in Bellman's epistles and songs. The epistles, written and performed in different styles, from drinking songs and laments to pastorales, paint a complex picture of the life of the city during the 18th century. A frequent theme is the demimonde, with Fredman's cheerfully drunk Order of Bacchus, a loose company of ragged men who favour strong drink and prostitutes. At the same time as depicting this realist side of life, Bellman creates a rococo picture, full of classical allusion, following the French post-Baroque poets. The women, including the beautiful Ulla Winblad, are "nymphs", while Neptune's festive troop of followers and sea-creatures sport in Stockholm's waters. The juxtaposition of elegant and low life is humorous, sometimes burlesque, but always graceful and sympathetic. The songs are "most ingeniously" set to their music, which is nearly always borrowed and skilfully adapted.

== Song ==
=== Music and verse form ===
Melody of Epistle 9
Epistle 9's melody, modified from Johan Helmich Roman's Drottningholmsmusiken

The Epistle was written in the spring of 1770. The melody was initially thought to have been based on the 1768 French air du drapeau called "Tout n'est que vanité" from Bonafos de la Tour's Cantiques, but Bellman's timbre "Menuet" shows that he was using an instrumental tune, not a sung canticle. The musicologist James Massengale writes that a more likely source, found by Patrik Vretblad, is Johan Helmich Roman's 1744 Drottningholmsmusiken, No. 20, Allegro. As usual, Bellman modified the melody to suit the song. There are four stanzas, each consisting of 16 lines, with cello interludes. The rhyming scheme is AABC-DDBC-BB-CEE-FFE. The Epistle's time signature is 3/4, with its tempo marked Menuetto.

=== Lyrics ===
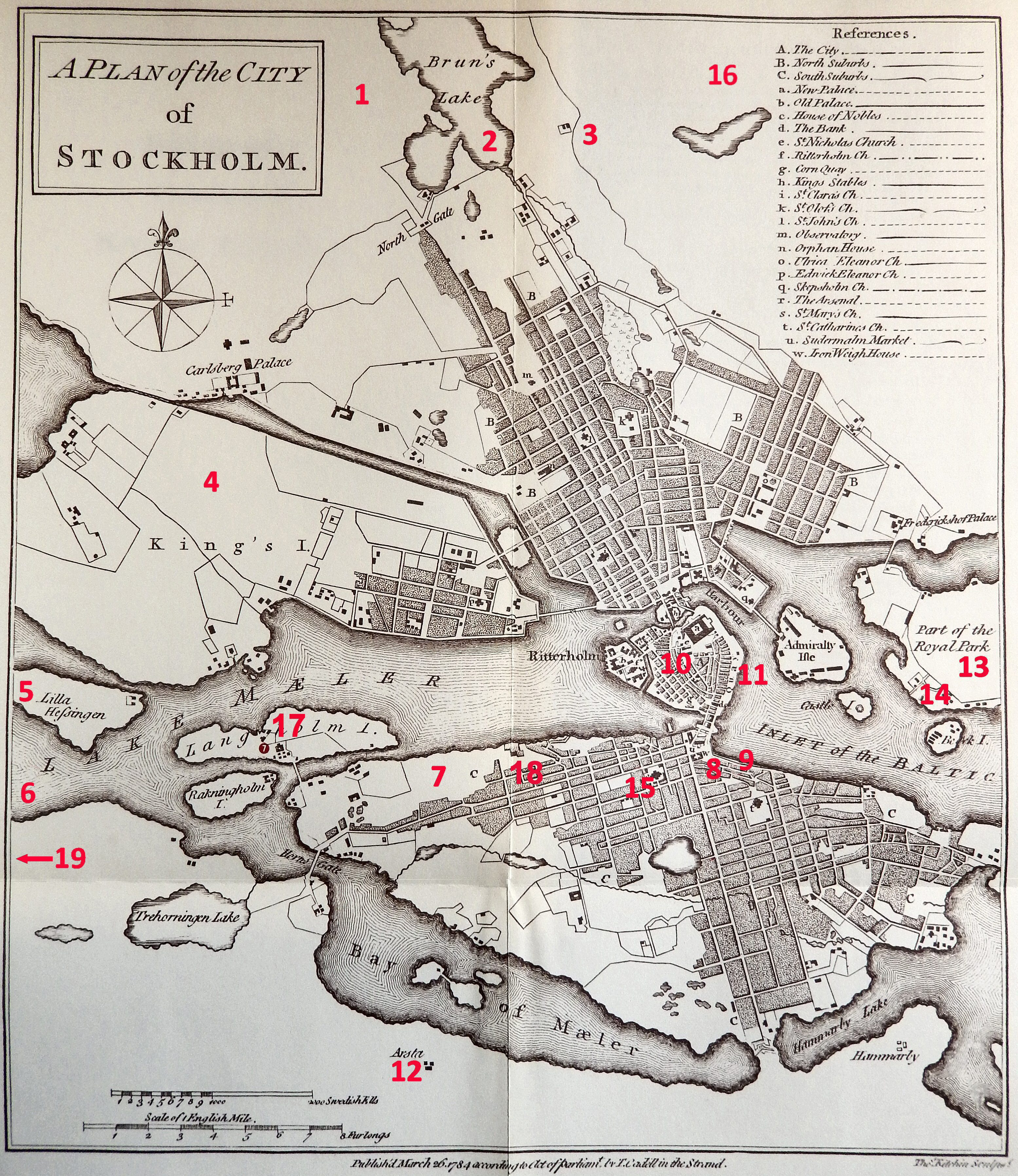
Map of Bellman's Stockholm, places of interest for his Fredman's Epistles and Songs on map from William Coxe's Travels into Poland, Russia, Sweden, and Denmark, 1784. 1 Haga park (S. 64) – 2 Brunnsviken – 3 Första Torpet (Ep. 80) – 4 Kungsholmen – 5 Hessingen (Ep. 48) – 6 Lake Mälaren (Ep. 48) – 7 Södermalm – 8 Urvädersgränd – 9 Lokatten tavern (Ep. 11, Ep. 59, Ep. 77), Bruna Dörren tavern (Ep. 24, Ep. 38) – 10 Gamla stan (Ep. 5, Ep. 9, Ep. 23, Ep. 28, Ep. 79) – 11 Skeppsbron Quay (Ep. 33) – 12 Årsta Castle – 13 Djurgården Park – (Ep. 25, Ep. 51, Ep. 82) – 14 Gröna Lund (Ep. 12, Ep. 62) – 15 Bellman's birthplace – 16 Fiskartorpet (Ep. 71) – 17 Lilla Sjötullen (Bellmanmuseet) (Ep. 48) – 18 Bensvarvars tavern (Ep. 40) 19 Rostock tavern (Ep. 45)

The subtitle text is "Til Gumman på Thermopolium Boreale och hännes Jungfrur." ("To the old Woman at Thermopolium Boreale and her Maidens."). The locale was a coffee-shop in Myntgränden, an alleyway in Stockholm's Gamla stan, run by Barbara Ekenberg. Coffee was at that time an expensive luxury. The drunken revelries, brandy, music, and dancing girls indicate however that the establishment was halfway to being a brothel.

The first stanza of Epistle 9
Carl Michael Bellman, 1790

Käraste Bröder, Systrar och Vänner,
Si Fader Berg han skrufvar och spänner
Strängarna på Fiolen
Och stråken han tar i hand.
Ögat är borta, Näsan är klufven;
Si hur han står och spottar på skrufven;
Ölkannan står på stolen;
Nu knäpper han litet grand;
V:cllo. - - - Grinar mot solen,
V:cllo.- - - Pinar Fiolen,
V:cllo.- - - - - - - - -
Han sig förvillar, drillar ibland.
Käraste Bröder dansa på tå,
Handskar i hand och hattarna på.
Si på Jungfru Lona,
Röda band i Skona,
Nya strumpor himmelsblå.

Eva Toller's prose translation

Dearest brothers, sisters, and friends,
see: father Berg tightens
the pegs on his fiddle,
and he grabs the bow.
His eye is gone, his nose is slit;
watch him spitting on the peg;
the ale pot is on the chair;
now he plucks the strings a bit;
he leers at the sun,
and torments the fiddle,
- - - - - - - - - - - -
now and then he trills in perplexity.
Dearest brothers, dance on your toes,
keep your gloves in your hand and your hats on.
Behold Lona the maid,
with red ribbons in her shoes,
and brand new azure-blue stockings.

== Reception and legacy ==
Carina Burman writes in her biography of Bellman that the song is one of the best-known of the early Epistles, and that it ends with Fredman's credo, a celebration of everything that is delightful in life, with drunkenness, dance, and love. These form one side of Fredman's world, she comments; the other side being anxiety, hangovers, and longing for death. Bellman himself keeps out of the fiction, with Fredman as the audience's eyes and ears. She notes that Fredman has been likened to a master of ceremonies, calling out the songs and explaining the action like an overenthusiastic tour guide. In the 18th century, ceremonies were fundamental, guiding individuals through life and through society. Through Fredman's eyes, however, the epistles never offer a sober, objective point of view. Epistle 9 presents, she writes, his typical mixture of elegance and drunkenness: "Käraste systrar, alltid honnett; / bröderna dansar jämt menuett, / hela natten fulla. / Rak i livet, Ulla, / ge nu hand, håll takten rätt!" (Dearest sisters, always honest; brothers always dance the minuet, drunk all night long. Stand straight, Ulla, give me your hand, keep to the time!) The Bellman Society calls the epistle much loved, succinctly stating the essence of Fredman's world with its "Här är Bacchus buden, här är Kärleks Guden, här är all ting, här är jag." (Here is Bacchus bidden, here is the God of Love, here is everything, here am I.").

The Epistle has been recorded by the actor Mikael Samuelson on his 1988 album Carl Michael Bellman, and by the troubadour Fred Åkerström on his 1977 album Vila vid denna källa, where it is the first track.

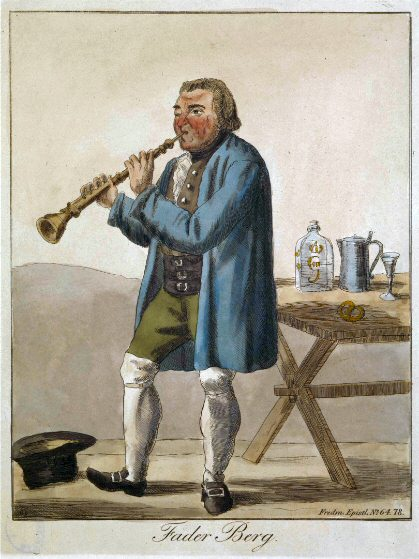
Fader Berg, the musician described in the epistle, shown here playing the oboe. Early 19th century engraving by Elis Chiewitz.

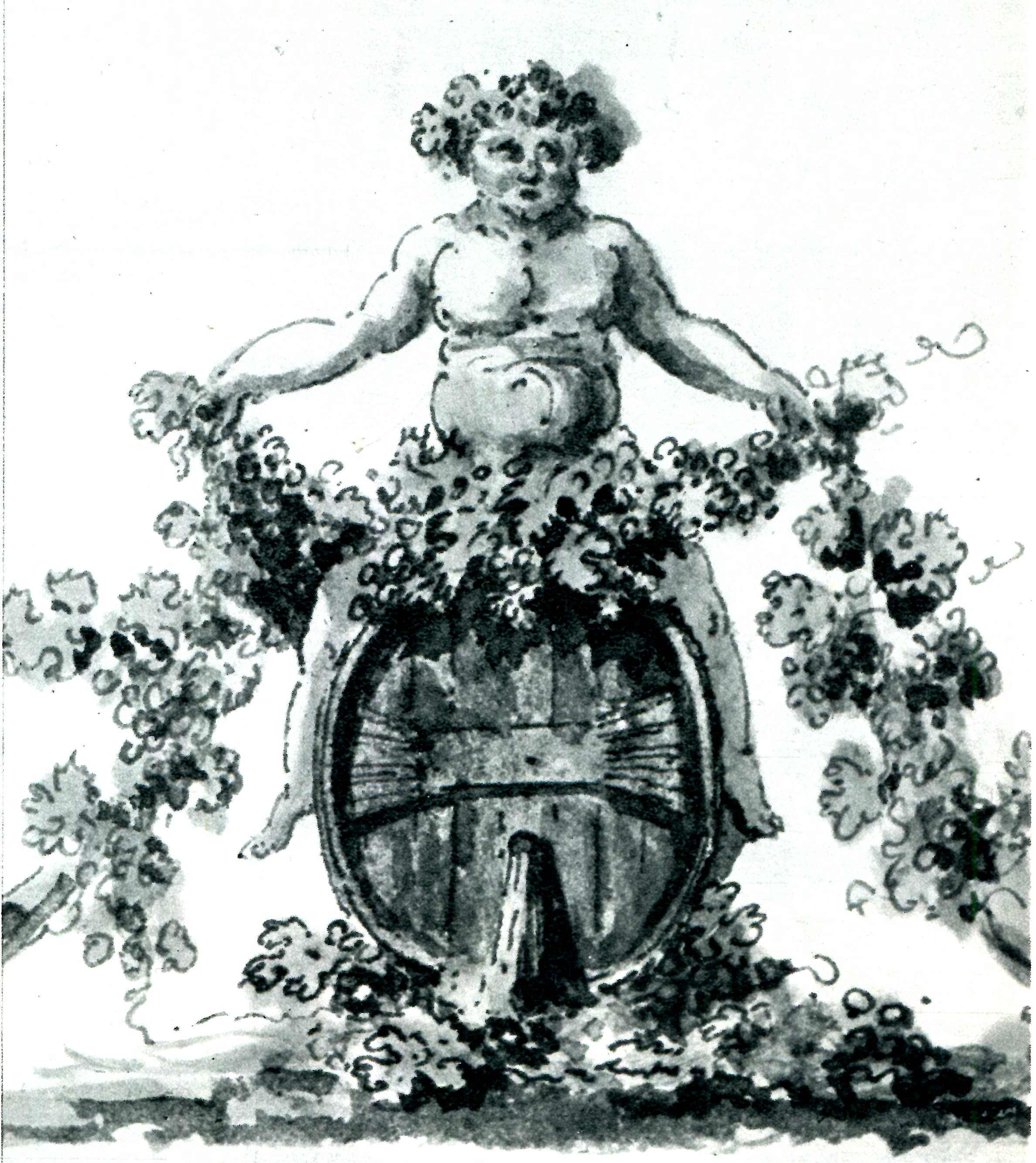
The epistle's credo sings "Here Bacchus is bidden!" Illustration of Bacchus, god of wine, by Johan Gottlob Brusell in one of Bellman's manuscripts.

== Sources ==
- Bellman, Carl Michael (1790). Fredmans epistlar. Stockholm: By Royal Privilege.
- Britten Austin, Paul (1967). The Life and Songs of Carl Michael Bellman: Genius of the Swedish Rococo. New York: Allhem, Malmö American-Scandinavian Foundation. ISBN 978-3-932759-00-0.
- Burman, Carina (2019). Bellman. Biografin [Bellman: The Biography] (in Swedish). Stockholm: Albert Bonniers Förlag. ISBN 978-9100141790.
- Hassler, Göran; Dahl, Peter (illus.) (1989). Bellman – en antologi [Bellman – an anthology]. En bok för alla. ISBN 91-7448-742-6. (contains the most popular Epistles and Songs, in Swedish, with sheet music)
- Kleveland, Åse; Ehrén, Svenolov (illus.) (1984). Fredmans epistlar & sånger [The songs and epistles of Fredman]. Stockholm: Informationsförlaget. ISBN 91-7736-059-1. (with facsimiles of sheet music from first editions in 1790, 1791)
- Massengale, James Rhea (1979). The Musical-Poetic Method of Carl Michael Bellman. Stockholm: Almqvist & Wiksell International. ISBN 91-554-0849-4.
