= Stockholmskällan =

History database for Stockholm, Sweden

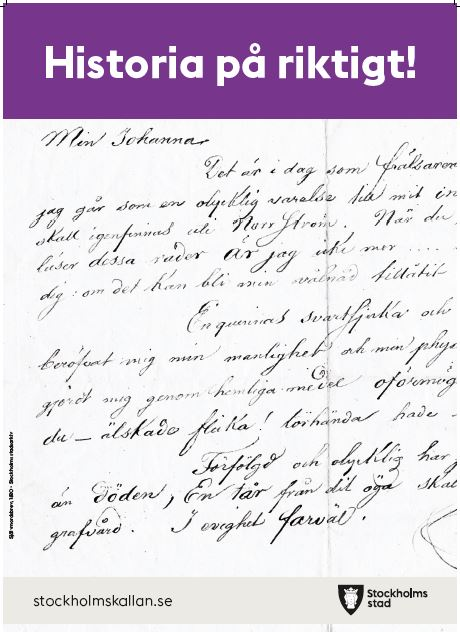
Poster from Stockholmskällan, showing a suicide note from 1820, Stockholm City Archives. The heading Historia på riktigt! translates as "History for real!".

Stockholmskällan is a database with over 30 000 archive items related to history of Stockholm, made available as a website since 2006 and freely accessible to the public. The main purpose is to present Stockholm's history to students and teachers and to offer primary sources to use in teaching.

== Organization ==
Stockholmskällan is run by the City of Stockholm and primarily handled by the city's education administration, in cooperation with Stockholm City Archives, Stockholm City Library, Stockholm City Museum and the Museum of Medieval Stockholm. These organizations collaborate with National Archives of Sweden, Spårvägsmuseet, Föreningen Stockholms Företagsminnen ("Stockholm Business History Association"), the National Library of Sweden and The Unstraight Museum. In the past, the Stockholm City Investigation and Statistics Office has also contributed material. The institutions contribute and publish a selection from their collections of different types of archive material on the Stockholmskällan website. An editorial team based at the Education Administration in the City of Stockholm coordinates and organizes the work and is responsible for the educational work directed at schools.

== History ==
In 2001, the Education Administration and the City Archives began a cooperation called "the historical laboratory". In 2003, the City Museum, the City Archives, the City Library and the Education Administration decided to create a common website for publishing source material on the Internet. During the years 2003–2006, the cooperation with schools in the city of Stockholm continued and a large part of the material in Stockholmskällan was entered at the direct request of the teachers and students involved. The Stockholmskällan website went public in February 2006. During 2016, work was underway to renew the Stockholmskällan website and to make it responsive so that the website will work better on mobile phones and tablets.

In 2017, Stockholmskällan received the international 'Heritage in Motion Award 2017' in the category 'website and online content' at the European Museum Academy conference in Skopje.

== Contents ==
Stockholmskällan's contents comes from the institutions that cooperate and collaborate on the website. Each institution is responsible for the contents published on the website. The contents includes more than 30 000 photographs, archive documents, printed documents, maps, works of art, reading suggestions, films, audio files, objects, drawings and other content that in some way informs about life in Stockholm through the centuries. A large number of publications can be read in full text.

== Target audience ==
The website is primarily aimed at teachers and students, where the material is intended to be used in teaching. The website contains lesson suggestions and examples of how Stockholmskällan's primary sources and other contents can be used in schools. The website is also aimed at anyone interested in the history of Stockholm.

== Gallery of examples ==
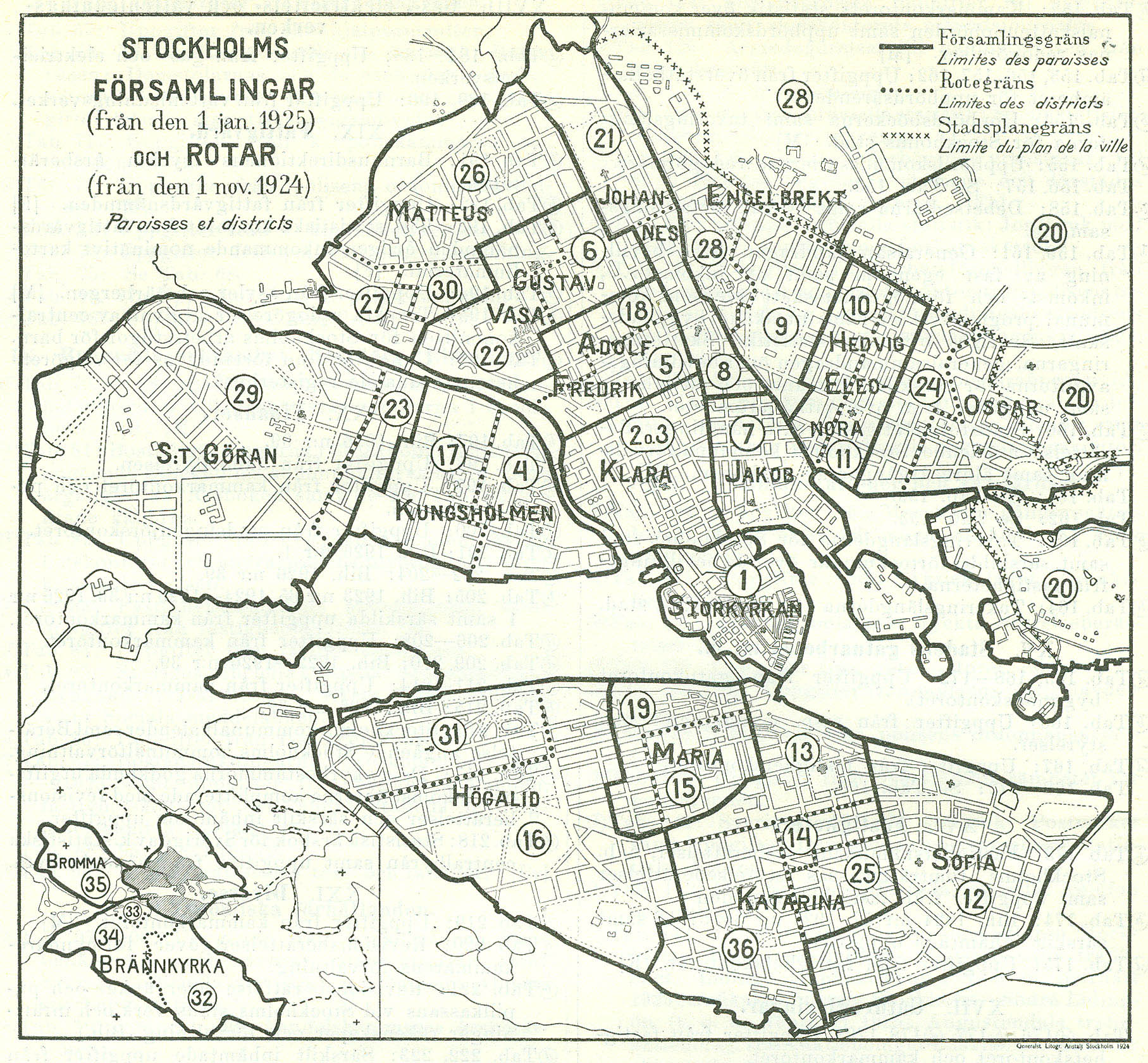
Sub-district map of Stockholm in 1924.

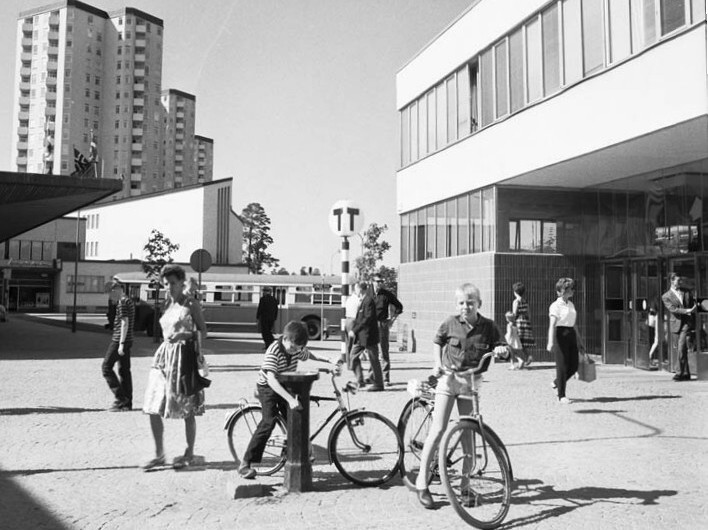
Photography from the center of Farsta in 1963.

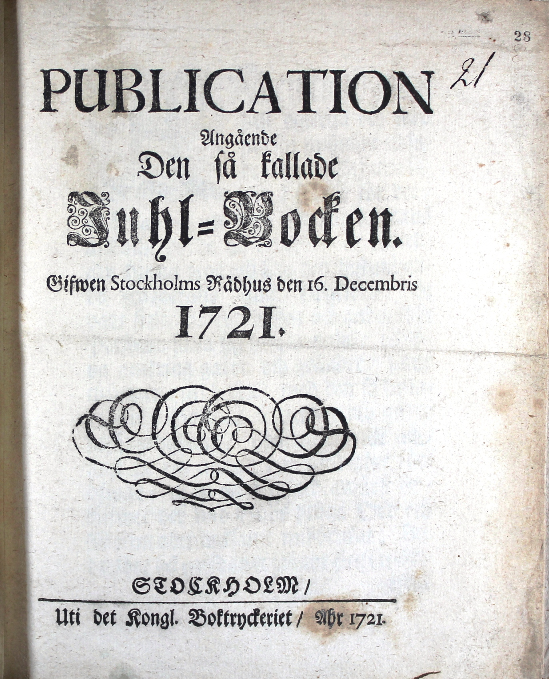
Stockholm authorities ban Yule goats, 1720.

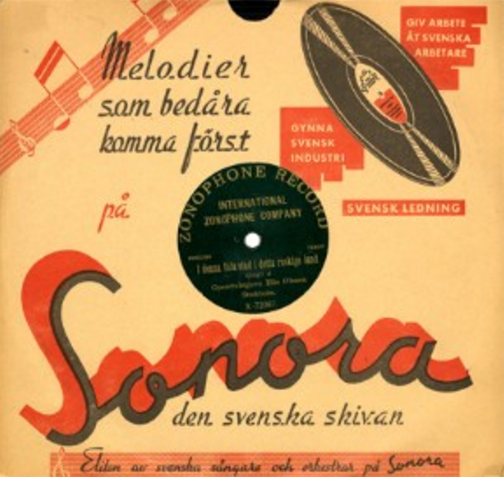
Sonora - the Swedish record, 1906.

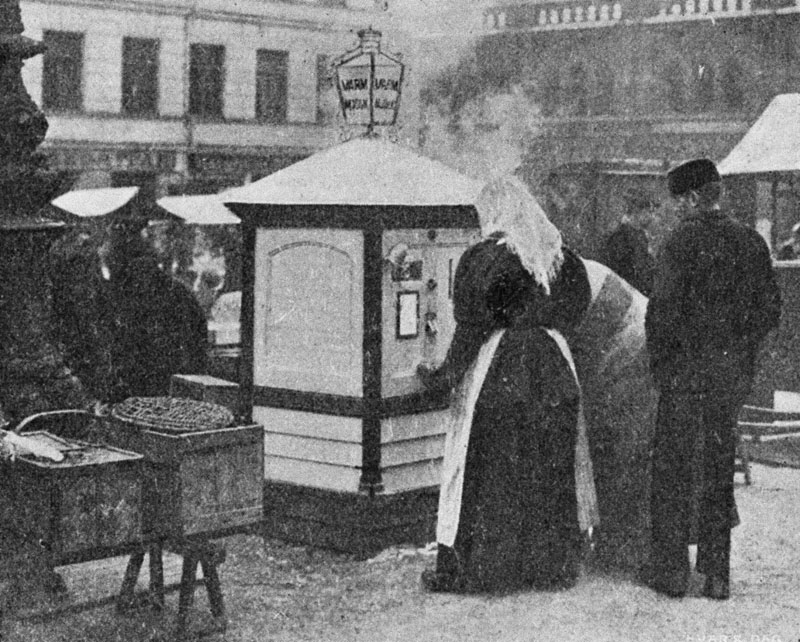
Hot milk machine on Östermalmstorg, year unknown.

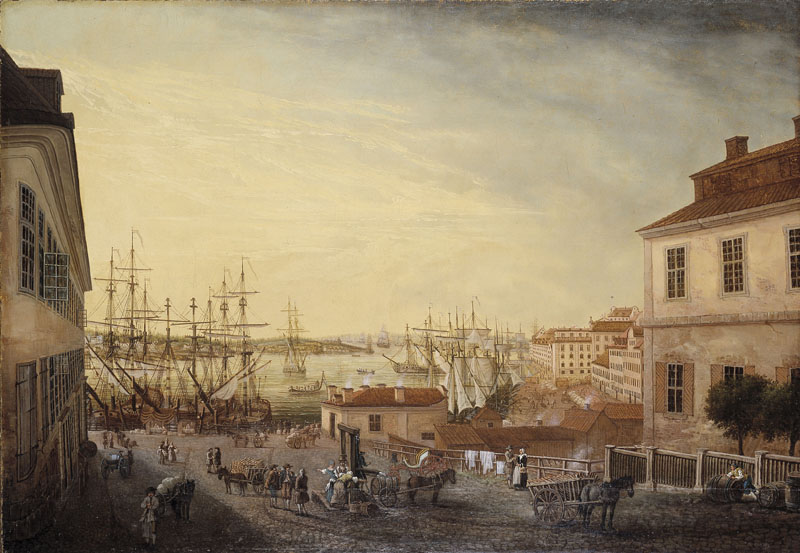
View from Brunnsbacken over Saltsjön. Johan Sevenbom, 1773.
