= Clas på Hörnet =

Hotel and restaurant in Stockholm, Sweden

Coordinates: 59°20′47.38″N 18°3′40.17″E

Clas på Hörnet is a hotel and restaurant on Surbrunnsgatan in Vasastan, Stockholm, Sweden, located to the northeast of the Stockholm School of Economics. It was founded by restaurateur Christer von Arnold in 1984. The building itself was originally the Browallshof inn, founded by Clas Browall in 1731. The 18th-century inn is famous in history as it is frequently mentioned in the poetry of Carl Michael Bellman.

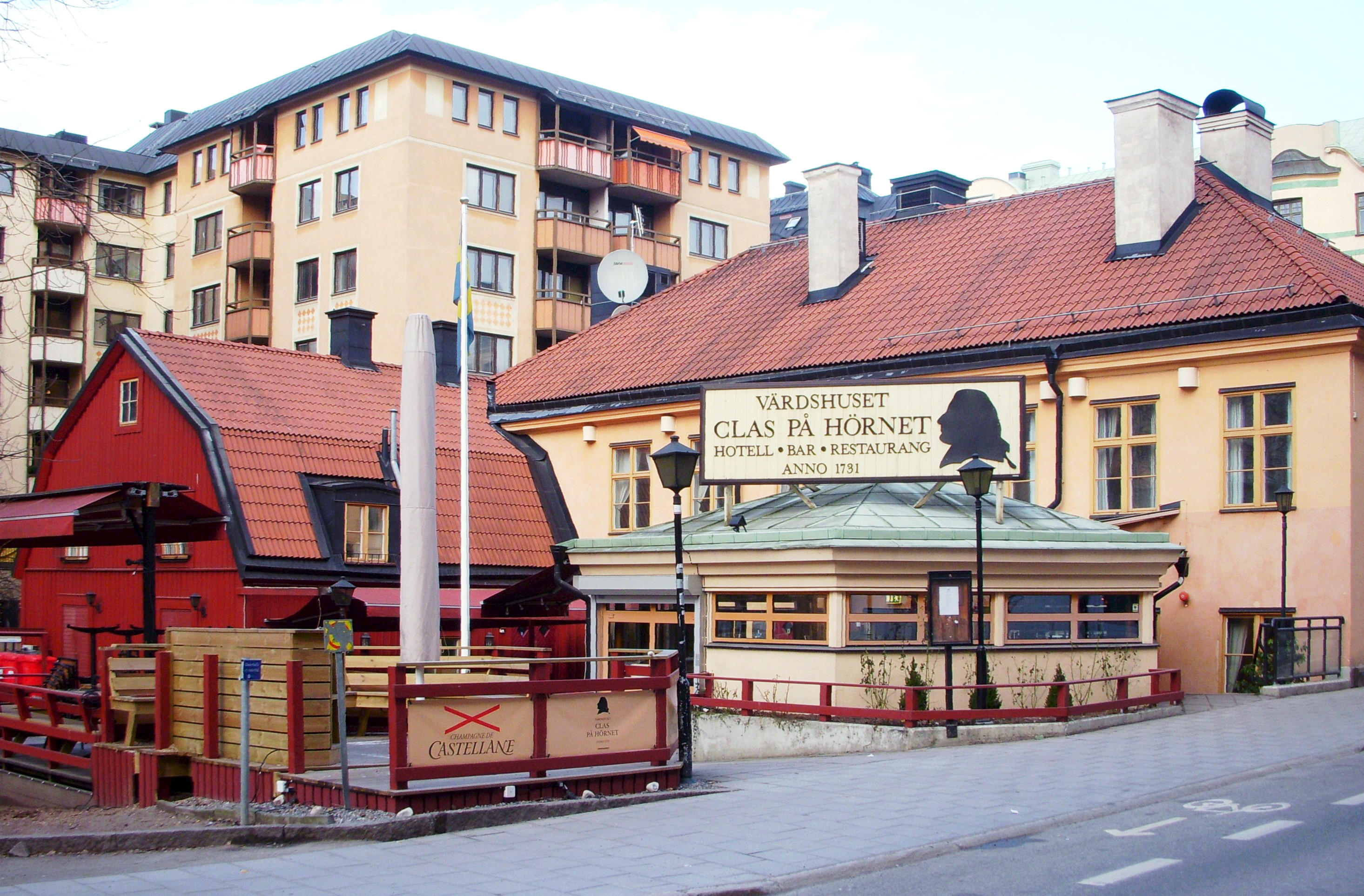

== History ==
=== Early history ===
In 1731, Clas Browall (d. 1742) and his spouse Annika Browall (d. 1749) bought the building called Hjärpes gård (Hjärpe farm) for their mutual savings from the inn Ingemarshof, where Clas had worked as a waiter and Annika as a manager. They named their own inn first Browallshof, but it was soon called Clas på Hörnet, both of them names from the co-founder of the inn.

The inn, which was very conveniently positioned close to the Roslagstull customs and the popular health spring Surbrunnen, quickly expanded into one of the most fashionable in Stockholm, frequented by customers of all social classes. It also offered the biggest dancing parlor in Stockholm, where balls were held by the aristocracy: in 1745, Frederick I of Sweden participated in one of the balls, where he was introduced to a replacement for Hedvig Taube.

=== Gustavian era ===
During the reign of Gustav III of Sweden, the inn was redecorated and expanded even further by its owner Petter Helin P:son, who took over in 1774 and made it renowned for its luxury with ten new ballrooms. In 1782, it was the stage of a scandal when the former courtier Carl Anders von Plommenfeldt mocked the monarch with negative remarks on a window (the window had a known inscription with the text "Gustav III, the first of citizens", to which Plommonfelt added "He used to be, but is now the first of fools") and was sentenced to death in his absence for Lèse-majesté.

=== 19th-century ===
In the early 19th century, the inn had lost its popularity among the upper classes. In an attempt to regain its former success, the owners launched the spring Ugglevik as a new health spring, and arranged balls to its honor, called the "Ugglevik balls". However, the Ugglevik balls attracted a different clientele than what had been the case in the 18th-century and the inn became in disrepute.

In 1834, the establishment was closed by the authorities, who needed the localities for a hospital for the victims of the severe cholera epidemic which came to the capital that year, and afterward, the building was not regarded as secure for seven years. In 1841-1865, the inn was again in operation under Anna Stark.

In 1877, the building was taken over by Stockholm city authorities, who divided it into apartments. All of the building except the present wing was torn down during the 20th-century.

=== Modern history ===
In 1984, the current restaurant Clas på Hörnet was opened by the restaurateur Christer von Arnold.

== See also ==
- Maja-Lisa Borgman
- Barbara Ekenberg
