= Maja-Lisa Borgman =

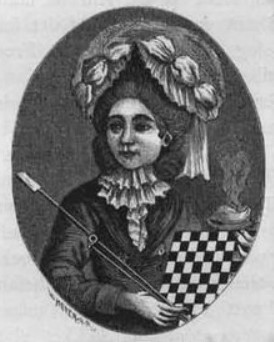
Maja-Lisa Borgman

Maria Elisabeth "Maja-Lisa" Borgman (1750s – 14 May 1791), was the owner of a famed coffee house in Stockholm during the reign of Gustav III of Sweden and a known local profile in contemporary Gustavian Stockholm.

== Life and career ==
Maja-Lisa Borgman founded, owned and managed the coffee house Maja-Lisas on Riddarholmen, which was named after her and became one of the most successful in contemporary Sweden. Coffee houses became common in Stockholm in the 1720s and had a reputation as the center of public intellectual debate, as they normally offered newspaper-reading parlors, where the customers were offered to read the latest newspapers and discuss the latest news. The profession of coffee house-manager was dominated by women, of which Borgman was a celebrity within her profession in contemporary Sweden and known as "The High Priestess of the Goddess Coffea" in Stockholm.

In the Stockholm register of 1790, Borgman is listed as an unmarried Mamsell of 33 or 38 years old, and the head of a household including a boy at the age of nine, a foster daughter, two maidservants, a servant girl and a married woman as an assistant. She was taxed for a gold watch and reportedly quite well off. During the 1780s, her coffee house was known as the first center for Chess games in Sweden, were the chess players Daniel Djurberg and Olof Samuel Tempelman were frequent guests. It is possible that she participated herself, and she is often referred to in older Swedish chess literature.

A Chalcography in the National Library of Sweden depicts her with the text:

"Here you may see a Lais in the taste of the time
United love games, coffee and tobacco."

Maja-Lisa Borgman died of a cold. Her coffee house, Maja-Lisas, was managed by its new owners under the same name, sometimes as "Former Maja-Lisas", at least until 1813.

== See also ==
- Barbara Ekenberg
- Clas på Hörnet
