= Barbara Ekenberg =

Swedish coffeehouse owner

Elsa Barbro "Barbara" Ekenberg (1717–25 May 1799), was the owner and manager of a coffeehouse in Stockholm in 1772–1799. She was a figure in the work of Carl Michael Bellman, who dedicated to her one of his Fredman's Epistles, No. 9 "Käraste Bröder Systrar och Vänner", with the dedication Till Gumman på Thermopolium Boreale och hennes jungfrur ('To the Old woman of the Thermopolium Boreale and her maidens').

== Biography ==
Barbara Ekenberg managed a coffeehouse after the death of her spouse, Carl Ekenberg, and made it a popular and well-frequented establishment in Gustavian era Stockholm. Her house was known for the innovation of banning smoking, which was a problem in the rest of the coffeehouses, where the smoke was often so thick as to cause breathing problems.

Bellman described her as squinting and fat but her "maidens" (waitresses) as beautiful, and her house widely known for its music and merry atmosphere. In his song Fredman's Epistle no. 9, dedicated to Ekenberg, he wrote:

Bellman's description of Ekenberg
Fredman's Epistle no. 9, 1770
Käraste Bröder Systrar och Vänner

Hör Fader Berg, säg du hvad hon heter,
Hon där vid skänken vindögd och feter?
Gumman på Thermopoljum,
Hon är det, ja ta mig Fan.

Prose translation

Tell me, Father Berg, say what's her name,
Her over there by the sideboard, squinting and fat?
The woman at Thermopolium,
That's her, the devil take me.

== See also ==
- Maja-Lisa Borgman
- Clas på Hörnet
