= Elis Chiewitz =

- Born: April 13, 1784; Stockholm
- Died: June 24, 1839 (aged 55); Åland
- Occupations: Painter, cellist
- Known for: Illustrations of Fredman's Epistles

Elis Chiewitz (pronounced tje:vits), born 13 April 1784 in Stockholm, died 24 June 1839 in Hammarlund, Åland, was a Swedish musician and artist.

== Biography ==
Elis Chiewitz was the son of the court chapel violinist Paul Johansson Cheiwitz and Christina Elisabeth Runius. He was the brother of Johan Georg Chiewitz and the uncle of Georg Theodor Chiewitz. He studied music and already as a young cellist gave concerts, including at the court chapel. He began his art studies at the Swedish Academy of Fine Arts in 1801; despite encouragement and several medals he remained a student as late as 1820. He participated several times in the academy's exhibitions with genre pictures, landscape and historical scenes in oils or watercolour.

He is best known for his illustrations, especially for the two albums Gallery of Fredman's epistles in 1826 and Gallery of Fredman's songs in 1827 with figures from the named works of Sweden's bard, Carl Michael Bellman. These include twelve group scenes and twenty-five single figures in coloured line etching after watercolour ink drawings. He also illustrated Svenska Teater-Galleriet in 1826 with twenty-four characters from various songs and speeches, and Ett år i Stockholm in 1837.

Some of Elis Chiewitz's colour lithographs later served as models for coffin letters printed at Berlingska boktryckeriet in Lund.

In his last years, he was active as a drawing teacher in Åbo (Turku) and Åland, where he wrote and illustrated the textbook Handbok i linearteckning in 1836. His work is represented in the Nationalmuseum, Stockholm, Norrköping's art museum, The Nordic Museum, Uppsala University Library, and the National Library of Sweden.

== Fredman's Epistles ==
Illustrations of Fredman's Epistles, 1826

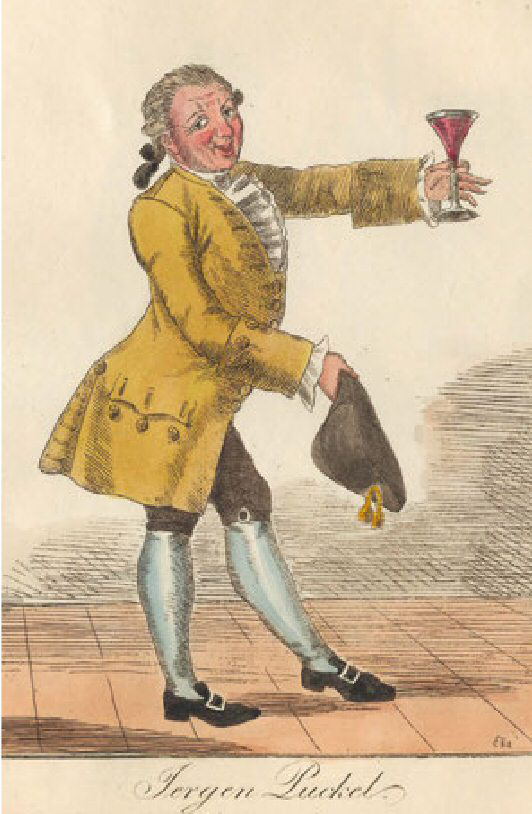
Jergen Puckel

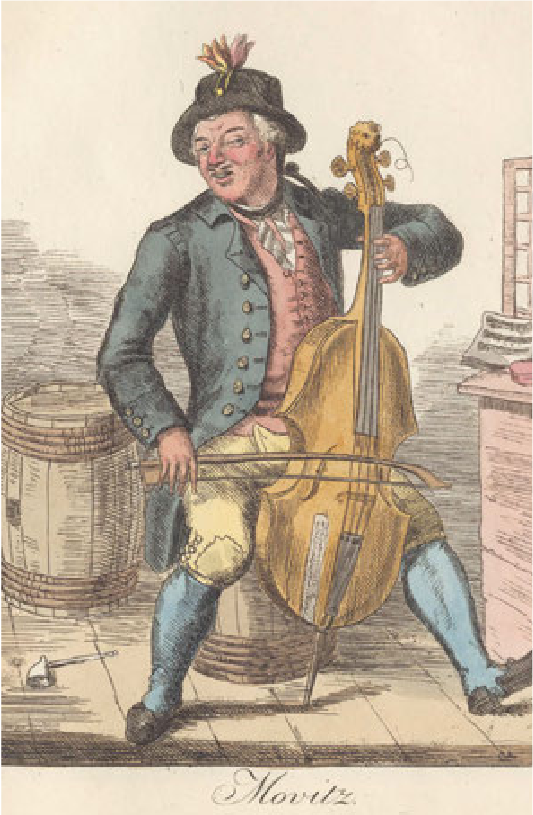
Movitz

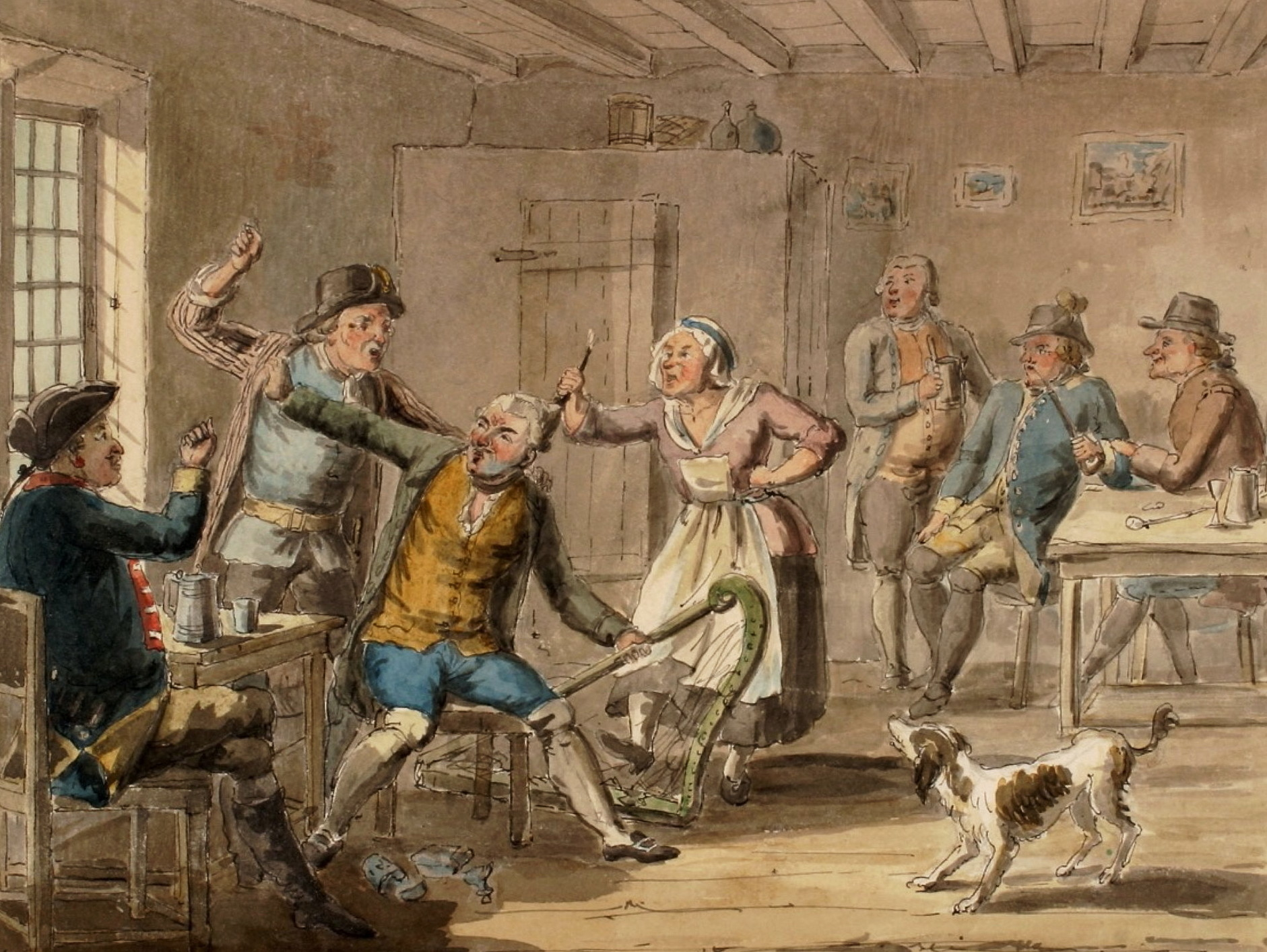
Ep. 45: "Tjenare Mollberg, hur är det fatt?": Mollberg is beaten up in the Rostock tavern

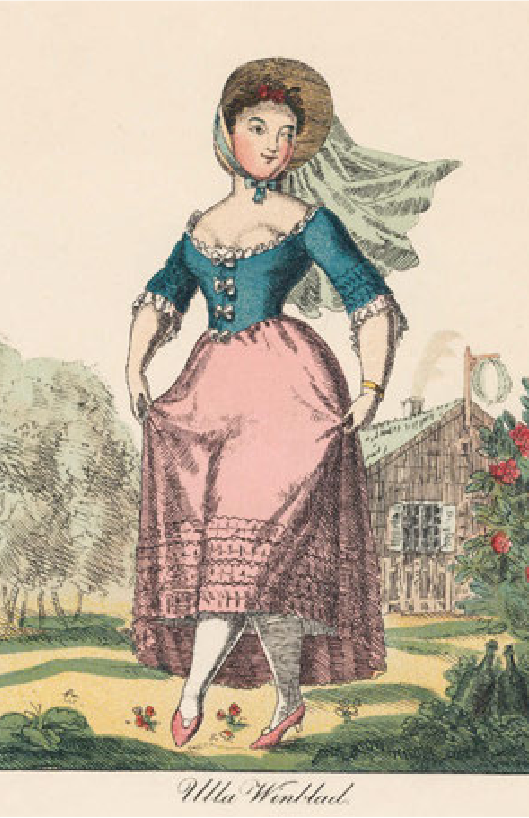
Ulla Winblad

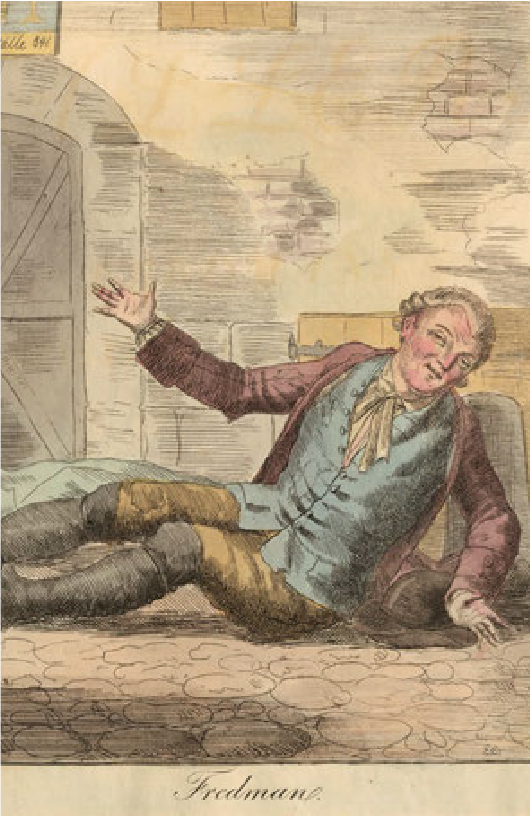
Fredman
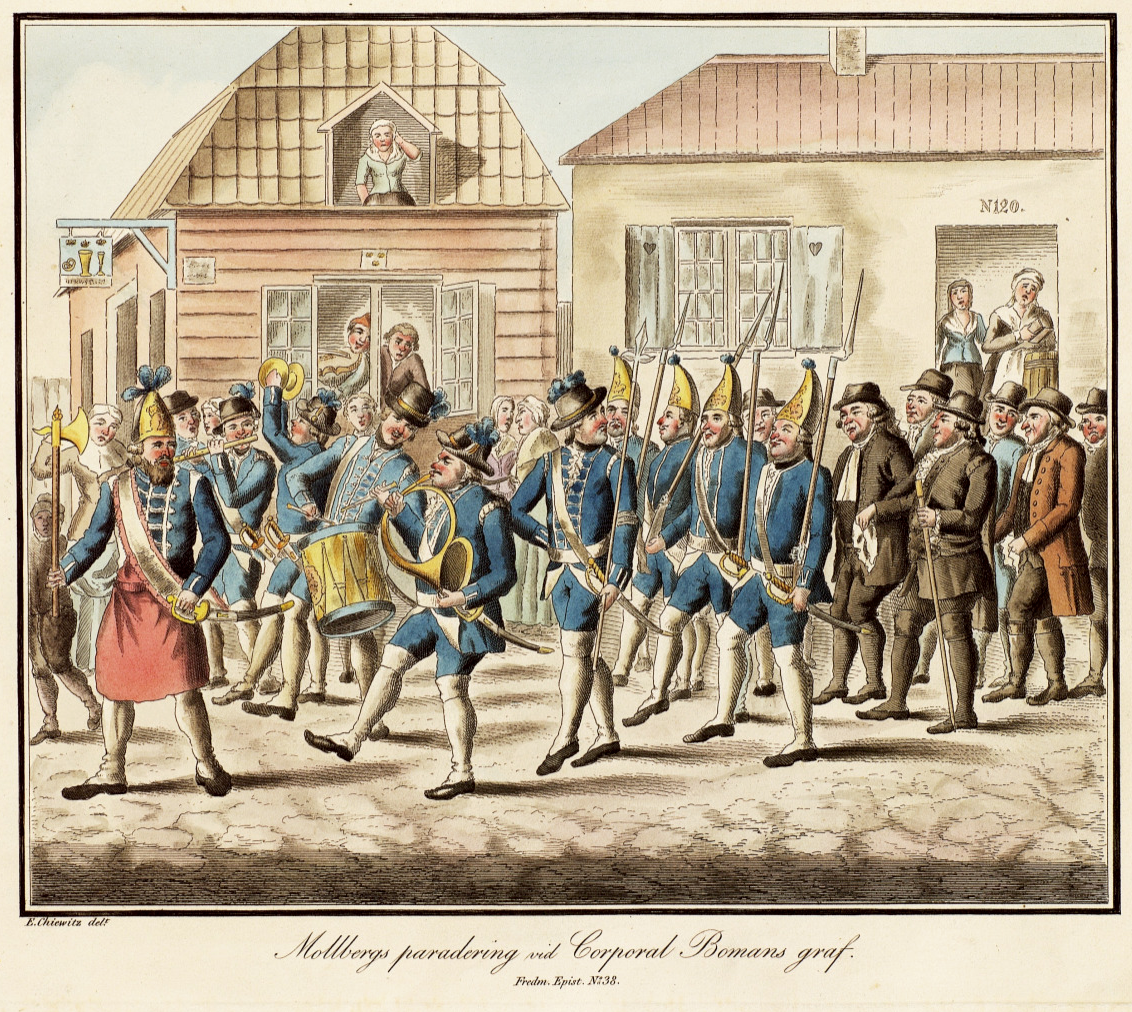
Ep. 38: "Mollberg's parading at Corporal Boman's Grave"

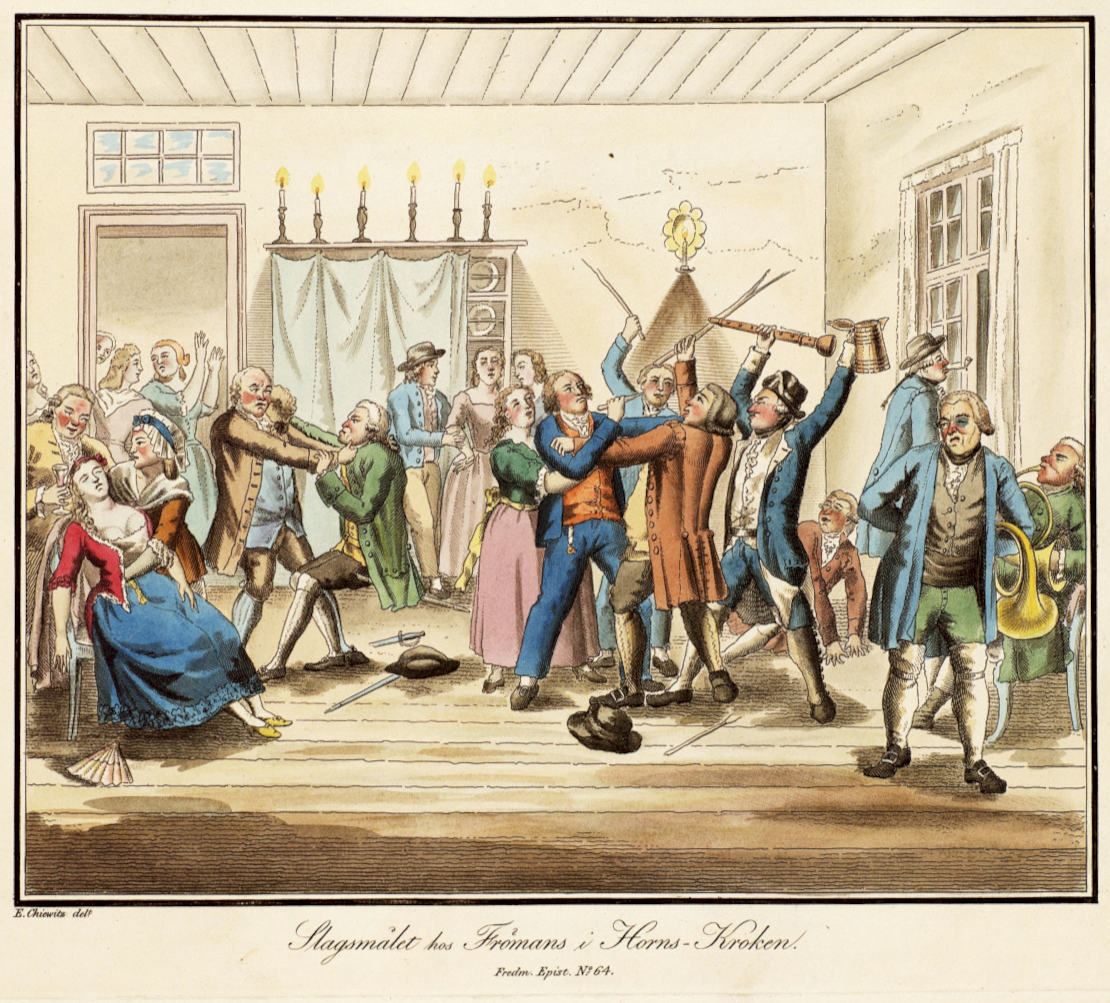
Ep. 64: "The Fight at Fröman's Tavern in Horns-Kroken"

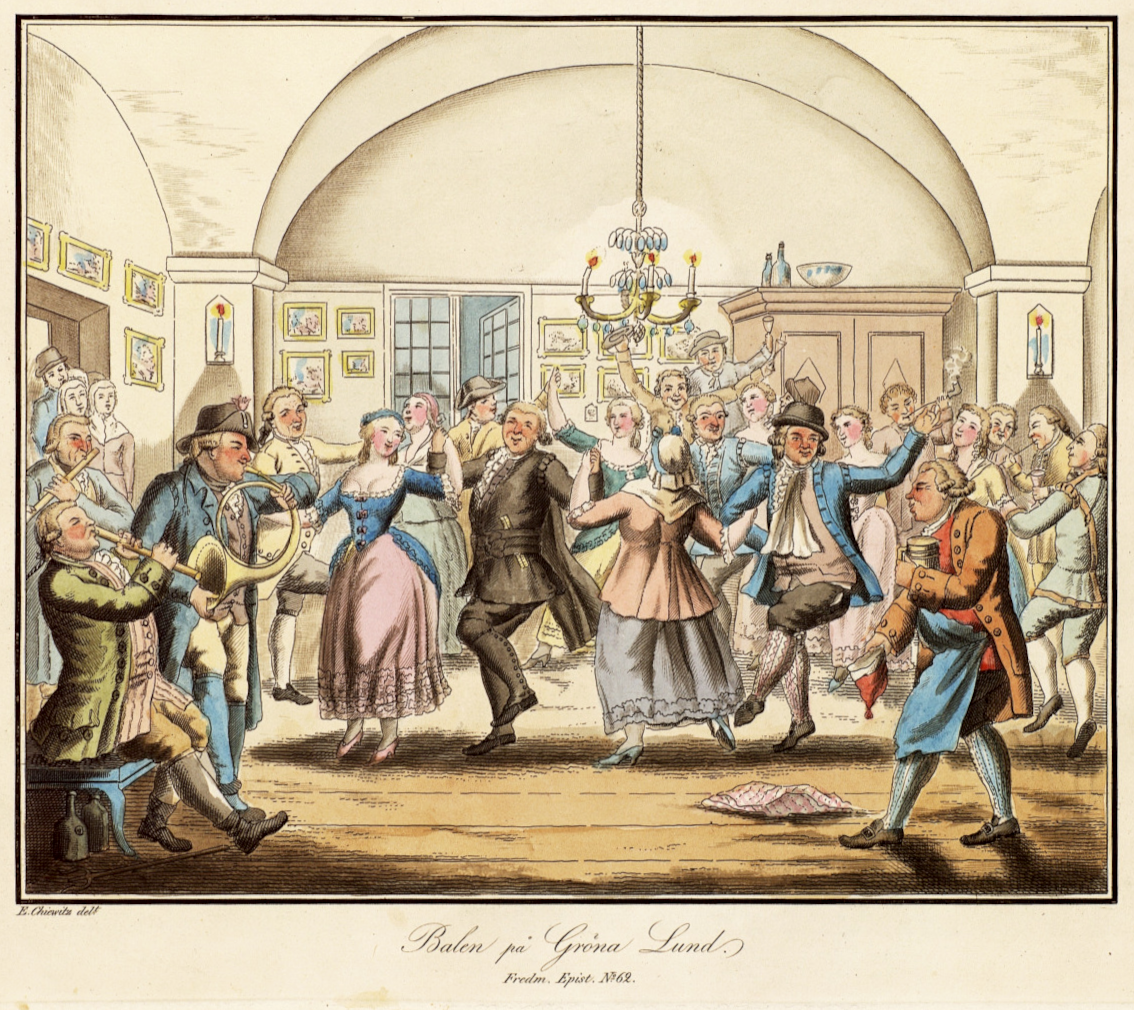
Ep. 62: "The Ball at Gröna Lund"

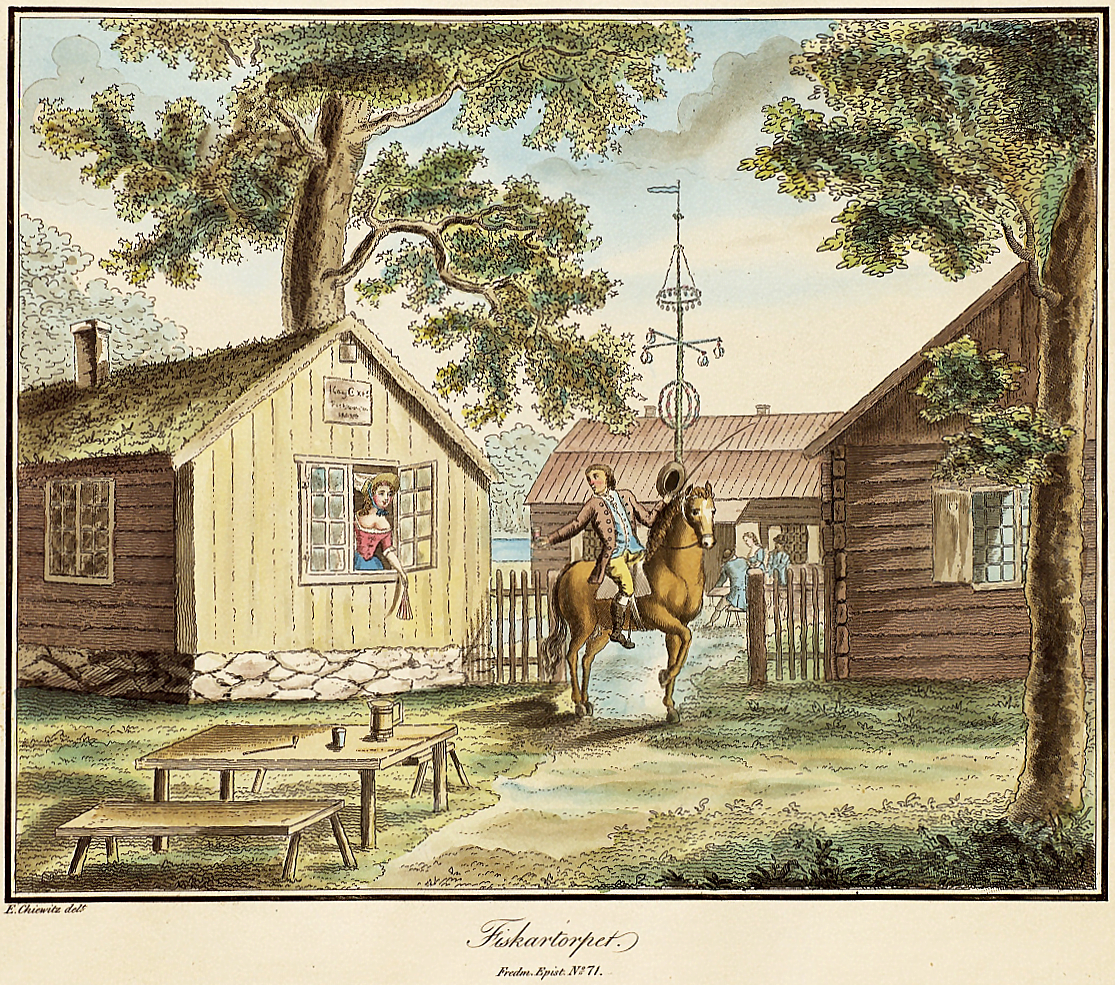
Ep. 71: Ulla! min Ulla! säj får jag dig bjuda: Fredman woos Ulla Winblad in the window at Fiskartorpet

== Sources ==
- Jungmarker, Gr.: "Elis Chiewitz", Svenskt biografiskt lexikon, 1929.
- Svenskt konstnärslexikon part I page 306, Allhems Förlag, Malmö.
- Svenska konstnärer, Biografisk handbok, Väbo Förlag, 1987, page 97.
- Svensk uppslagsbok. Malmö 1931.
